= David Alan Rosenberg =

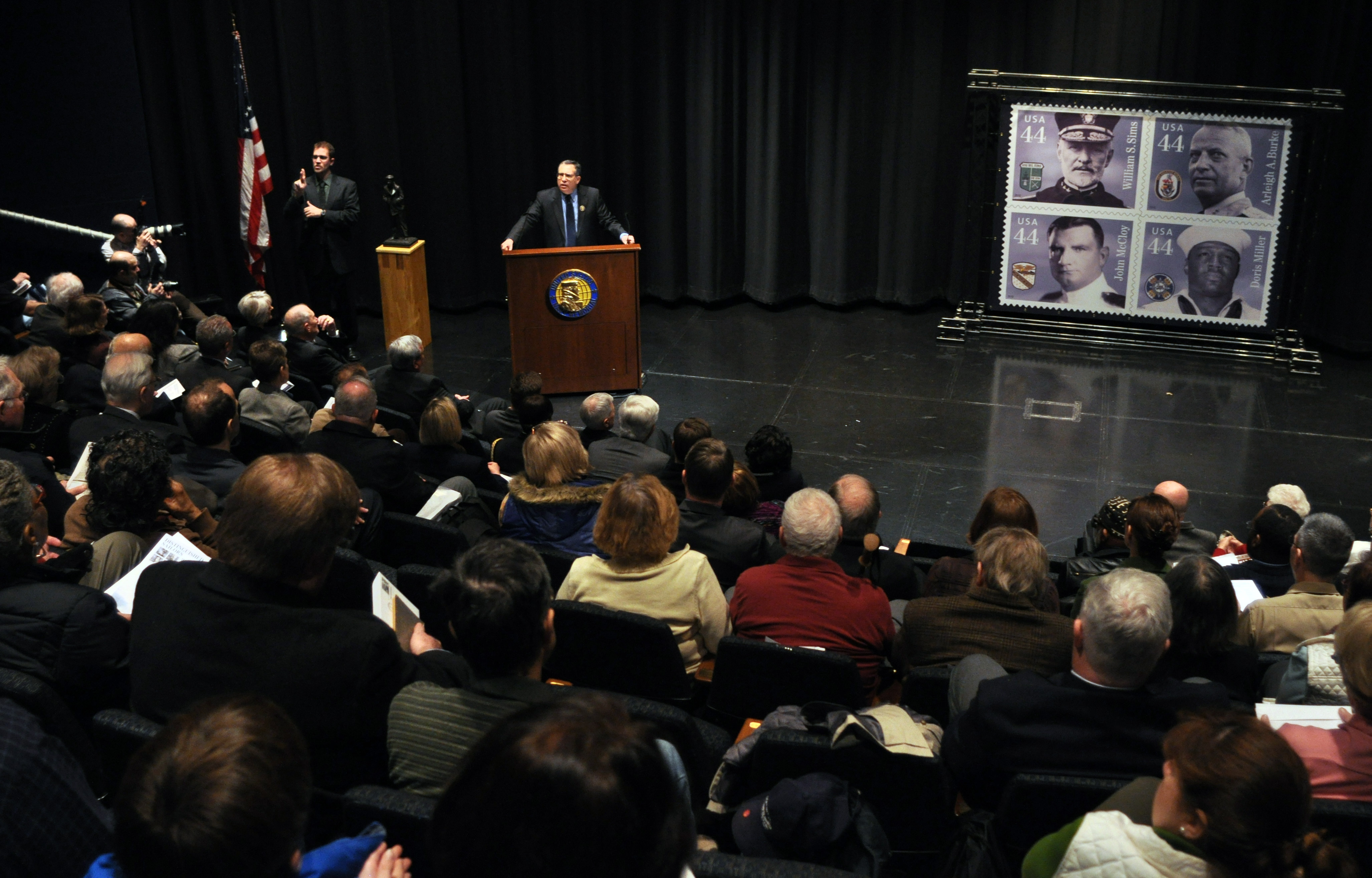
- Rosenberg speaking at ceremony at the U.S. Navy Memorial, presenting Distinguished Sailors commemorative stamps
- Born: 1948 (age 77–78)

Academic background
- Education: University of Chicago; American University

Academic work
- Discipline: Military history
- Institutions: United States Naval Academy; Naval War College; Temple University

David Alan Rosenberg (born 1948) is a military historian, and was Admiral Harry W. Hill Chair of Maritime Strategy at the National War College from 1996 to 2003 and held the Class of 1957 Distinguished Chair of Naval Heritage at the United States Naval Academy in 2015–2016.

== Life ==
He graduated from American University, and from University of Chicago with an M.A., and Ph.D. He taught at Temple University.

He has received scholar grants for research from the Harry S. Truman Library Institute (1974, 1975, 1983), the Lyndon Baines Johnson Foundation (1983, 1992), the Ford Foundation (1985, 1986). In 1995, he was appointed and elected Chair of the Secretary of the Navy's Advisory Subcommittee on Naval History.

== Awards ==
- 1980 Binkley-Stephanson Prize from the Organization of American Historians
- 1980 Bernath Article Prize from the Society for Historians of American Foreign Relations
- 1988 MacArthur Fellows Program
- 1995 Department of the United States Navy Meritorious Public Service Award from the Chief of Naval Operations
- 2000 Department of the Navy Superior Civilian Service Award by the Chief of Naval Operations

== Works ==
- "The Origins of Overkill: Nuclear Weapons and American Strategy 1945 - 1960", International Security, 7 No. 4 Spring 1983
- "Being "Red": The Challenge of Taking the Soviet Side in War Games at the Naval War College". Naval War College Review 41:81-93 Winter '88
- "Pincher : campaign plans", America's plans for war against the Soviet Union, 1945-1950, New York : Garland Pub., 1989. ISBN 978-0-8240-7153-0
- "Admiral Arleigh Burke: Instinct", Joseph J Thomas, Ed., Leadership Embodied: The Secrets to Success of the Most Effective Navy and Marine Corps Leaders (Annapolis, MD: Naval Institute Press, 2005): 145–149.
- The admirals' advantage: U.S. Navy operational intelligence in World War II and the Cold War, Authors Christopher A. Ford, David Alan Rosenberg, Randy Carol Balano, Naval Institute Press, 2005, ISBN 978-1-59114-282-9
- Rosenberg, David Alan (1997). "Arleigh Burke: The Last CNO". In Bradford, James C. (ed.). Quarterdeck and Bridge: Two Centuries of American Naval Leaders. Naval Institute Press. pp. 361–393. ISBN 9781557500960.
