= Secretary of the Air Force Historical Advisory Committee =

The Secretary of the Air Force's Advisory Committee on the Air Force Historical Program was authorized in August 1968 at the time of the establishment of the Office of Air Force History. Since 1996, it has been a subcommittee of the Department of Defense Historical Advisory Committee.

== History ==
The committee is the successor of the Standing Historical Advisory Committee that had been established in 1945 to advise on the seven-volume history, The Army Air Forces in World War II, prepared under the editorship of Wesley Frank Craven and James L. Cate. As this projected neared completion, it met increasingly less frequently and had ceased to operate by 1958.

== Chairmen ==
The following, listed in chronological order, have served as chairmen of the committee. In those cases where individuals have also served as individual members, their names and dates are also shown separately for that service in the alphabetical list of members:

- I.B. Holley, Jr., 1968-

== Civilian Members ==
The following is an alphabetical list of committee members, who have served since 1968, with their dates of service as members. Committee chairs are listed above with their dates as chairmen:

- Robert F. Byrnes, 1971-
- Henry F. Graff, 1972-
- Roy Lamson, 1968–1973
- Thomas W. McKnew, 1968–1970
- Louis Morton, 1968-
- Forrest C. Pogue, 1975-

== Sources ==
- Richard W. Leopold, "Historians and the Federal Government: Historical Advisory Committees: State, Defense, and the Atomic Energy Commission," The Pacific Historical Review, vol. 44, No. 3. (Aug 1975), pp. 373–385.
