= John Donald Hicks =

American historian (1890–1972)

- Born: January 25, 1890; Pickering, Missouri, U.S.
- Died: February 4, 1972 (aged 82); Palm Desert, California, U.S.
- Occupation: Historian
- Known for: The Populist Revolt (1931)

Academic background
- Education: Northwestern University (BA 1913; MA 1914); University of Wisconsin–Madison (PhD 1916)
- Doctoral advisor: Frederic L. Paxson

Academic work
- Discipline: United States history
- Institutions: Hamline University (1916–1922); North Carolina College for Women (1922–1923); University of Nebraska (1923–1932); University of Wisconsin–Madison (1932–1942); University of California, Berkeley (1942–1957)

John Donald Hicks (January 25, 1890 – February 4, 1972) was an American historian specializing in United States political history. He was best known for his book The Populist Revolt (1931) on the American Populist movement and for his textbooks of U.S. history beginning with The Federal Union (1937). He held a named chair at the University of California, Berkeley 1942–1957, where he also became Dean of the Graduate Division and chaired the history department, and he served as president of the Mississippi Valley Historical Association 1932–1933, the Agricultural History Society 1948–1949, and the Pacific Coast Branch of the American Historical Association 1954–1955.

== Early life and education ==
Hicks was born on January 25, 1890, in Pickering, Missouri to a Methodist minister and a country schoolteacher, and grew up attending Chautauqua lectures. He attended high school in Hopkins, Missouri, and at the Maryville Seminary. After graduating high school in 1906, he worked as a sheep herder and taught at rural schools in Johnson County, Wyoming.

In 1908, he went to Northwestern University to study for ministry. He graduated with his BA in 1913 and stayed on for an MA earned in 1914. At Northwestern, he became a brother of Delta Upsilon. He was particularly impressed and encouraged in history by medievalist William Pooley, who recommended him for his next position.

Hicks next moved to the University of Wisconsin–Madison as a teaching assistant to Carl Russell Fish. There he earned his PhD in American history in 1916 under Frederic L. Paxson, with a thesis on the constitutions of the six Western states admitted to the US 1889–1890.

== Career ==
Hicks found his first teaching position at Hamline University, where he was at times the only member of the history department. At Hamline, he began to publish his first journal articles; the first was on the Civil War volunteer army of 1861 called for by Abraham Lincoln's Proclamation 80 and the second on the career of Ignatius L. Donnelly.

In 1922, Hicks accepted a full professorship at the North Carolina College for Women, but he was unhappy there and quickly moved to the University of Nebraska in 1923, after making a presentation on the North Carolina Farmers' Alliance before the Nebraska history chair Guernsey Jones at an American Historical Association conference. At Nebraska, he began to teach graduate students and he served as chair of the history department and dean of the college of arts and sciences.

In 1931 Hicks published The Populist Revolt and became the most influential historian of the Populist movement of the 1890s. In a 1985 retrospective on the book's influence, Martin Ridge wrote that "Reviewers of The Populist Revolt commended Hicks for his judicious and objective treatment of a complex subject and praised not only his style but also his careful synthesis of the existing literature." Hicks emphasized economic pragmatism over ideals, presenting Populism as interest group politics, with have-nots demanding their fair share of America's wealth which was being leeched off by nonproductive speculators. Like other scholars Hicks portrayed the deep drought in the 1880s that ruined so many Kansas farmers. He searched for deeper grievances, including financial manipulations, deflation in prices caused by the gold standard, high interest rates, mortgage foreclosures, and high railroad rates. Corruption accounted for such outrages and Populists presented popular control of government as the solution, a point that later students of republicanism emphasized.

In 1932, Hicks returned to the University of Wisconsin–Madison to succeed his former advisor Frederic L. Paxson, who had left for the University of California, Berkeley. At Madison, he once again chaired the history department and taught graduate students. Among his notable students at Madison was Theodore Saloutos (PhD 1940). He served as president of the Mississippi Valley Historical Association 1932–1933.

During this time Hicks began to write textbooks, beginning with The Federal Union in 1937 and then The American Nation. Hicks's textbooks on U.S. history in various editions reached over two million undergraduates. Older readers appreciated its qualities. For example, historian George Fort Milton Jr. admired Hicks's "capacity for extraordinary compression without at the same time either getting the style too bare-bones for pleasurable reading; or the facts too black-and-white for the necessary implications of gradations of gray."

In 1942, Hicks left Madison to become the Morrison Professor of history at the University of California, Berkeley, reuniting with Paxson. He held this position from 1942 until 1957, when he retired emeritus; for one year, 1950–1951, he served as the visiting Pitt Professor of American History and Institutions at the University of Cambridge. At Berkeley, he directed 45 PhD dissertations. He was on many committees at Berkeley, as well as dean of the Graduate Division for two years, and he was chairman of the history department for four years. During this time he continued to write new textbooks and to lead professional organizations, including the Agricultural History Society (president 1948–1949) and the Pacific Coast branch of the American Historical Association (president 1954–1955).

== Personal life and death ==
During his time at Hamline University, Hicks married one of his senior students, Lucille Harriet Curtis. They would have three daughters and a son who died in infancy.

Hicks died of a pulmonary embolism on February 4, 1972, in Palm Desert, California.

== Selected work ==
=== Articles ===
- Hicks, John D. (February 1918). "The Organization of the Volunteer Army in 1861 with Special Reference to Minnesota". Minnesota History Bulletin. 2 (5): 324–368. JSTOR 20160250.
- Hicks, John D. (1921). "The Political Career of Ignatius Donnelly". The Mississippi Valley Historical Review. 8 (1/2): 80–132. doi:10.2307/1889278. JSTOR 1889278.
- Hicks, John D. (1922). "The Origin and Early History of the Farmers' Alliance in Minnesota". The Mississippi Valley Historical Review. 9 (3): 203–226. doi:10.2307/1895977. JSTOR 1895977.
- Hicks, John D.; Barnhart, John D. (July 1929). "The Farmers' Alliance". The North Carolina Historical Review. 6 (3): 254–280. JSTOR 23515792.

=== Books ===
- The Populist Revolt: A History of the Farmers' Alliance and the People's Party (U of Minnesota Press, 1931). online
- Twentieth-Century Populism : Agricultural Discontent in the Middle West, 1900–1939 with Theodore Saloutos (1951) online
  - First published as Agricultural Discontent in the Middle West, 1900–1939 (1951) online
- A Short History of American Democracy, (6 editions, with George E. Mowry, 1956+)
- Republican Ascendancy, 1921–1933 (1960), a major scholarly history of the 1920s
  - Normalcy and Reaction, 1921–1933: An Age of Disillusionment (1960), bibliography published as a pamphlet. online
- The Federal Union, 5 editions with George E. Mowry and Robert E. Burke (1963) 1964 edition online; covers U.S. to 1877.
- The American Nation; A History of the United States from 1865 to the present
- The American Nation, 5 editions with George E. Mowry and Robert E. Burke (1963) online covers 1492 to present.
- A History of American Democracy with George E. Mowry (1963) online
- My Life with History, an Autobiography, (1968), online
- The Constitution of the Northwest States (1972) online
- The American Tradition: The Unpublished Papers of John D. Hicks (1955), edited by George E. Mowry
