= Carafano =

Carafano is a surname. Notable people with the surname include:

- Chase Masterson, a.k.a. Christianne Carafano (born 1963), American actress, singer, and activist
- James Carafano (born 1955), American military writer
