= James Alfred Field =

James Alfred Field can relate to:

- James A. Field (1880–1927), American economist
- James A. Field Jr. (1916–1996), American historian
