= Francis Sampson =

Francis Sampson may refer to:

- Francis A. Sampson (1842–1918), American lawyer and historian
- Francis L. Sampson (1912–1996), Catholic priest and U.S. Army officer
- F. S. Sampson, (1814–1854), Presbyterian minister and academic
