= Richard G. Hewlett =

American historian

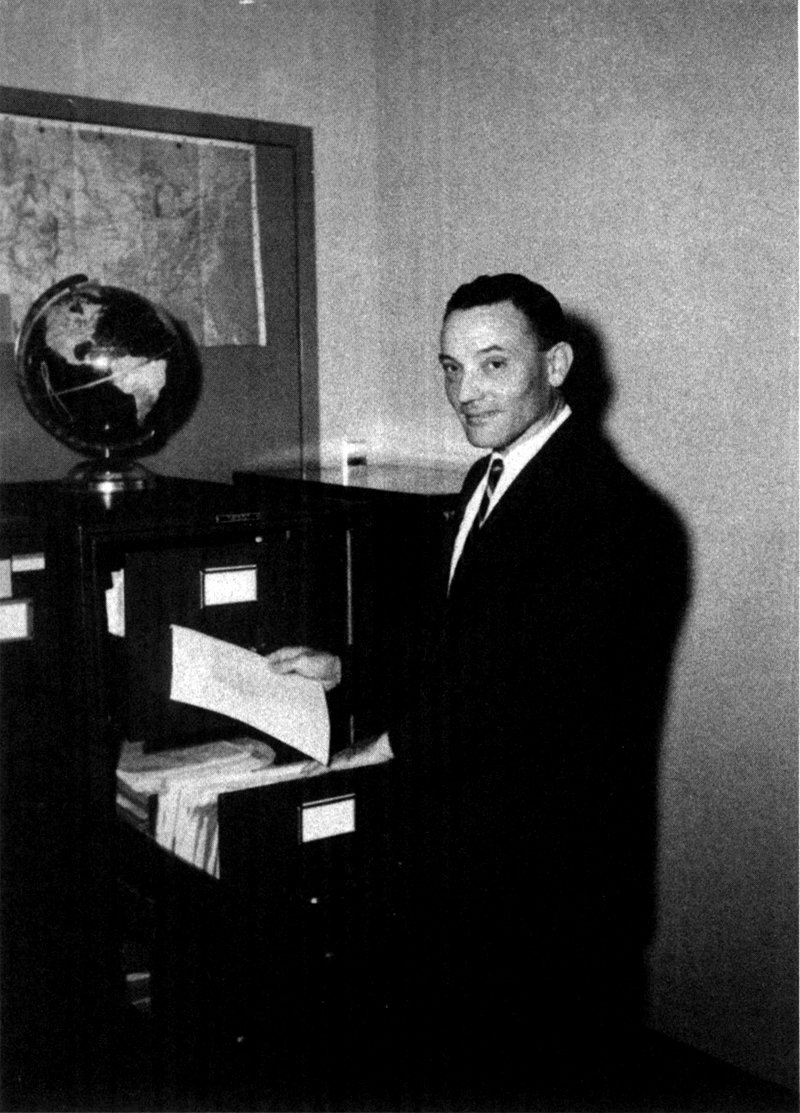
Richard G. Hewlett, posed with the Bush-Conant file on the development of the atomic bomb.

Richard Greening Hewlett (February 12, 1923 – September 1, 2015) was an American public historian best known for his work as the Chief Historian of the United States Atomic Energy Commission.

== Biography ==
Hewlett was born in Toledo, Ohio, in 1923. In 1941, he attended Dartmouth College, but after the attack on Pearl Harbor he enlisted in the U.S. Army Air Corps doing work related to meteorology. With a number of other privates he attended Bowdoin College for a year, focusing on science. In June 1944, he did work relating to using radar to track weather balloons, and eventually the military sent him to Harvard University to study in the electronics school. In early 1945, he was sent to Western China as a radiosonde operator, sending meteorological information by radio to U.S. forces, which used them in planning bombing raids on Japan. After the war, Hewlett attended graduate school in history at the University of Chicago, though he never completed his undergraduate degree. He received his master's degree in 1948 and his PhD in 1952, writing his thesis on Lewis Cass, a nineteenth-century Michigan politician.

While he was completing his dissertation, Hewlett accepted a position as an intelligence specialist in the United States Air Force, examining open literature on factories in the Soviet Union. Hewlett found the job tedious and in 1952 leaped at the chance to be a program analyst in the United States Atomic Energy Commission (AEC), compiling classified progress reports from all of the many branches of the AEC for the Commissioners. Hewlett later said that this job gave him a good general overview of the AEC and how it worked.

In 1957, Hewlett was contacted in order to find a historian to write an official history of the AEC, a pet project by Commissioner Lewis Strauss. Hewlett was unable to find any academic historians interested, however, in part because science and technology were generally not considered an interesting subject of historical study at the time. Because of his history backgrounds, Hewlett himself was offered the job, which he happily accepted, and became the first official historian of the AEC. Hewlett sought out another public historian, Kent Roberts Greenfield, who was the Chief Historian of the United States Army. Greenfield encouraged Hewlett to establish an independent review board of academic historians who would serve as a buffer between Hewlett and the government bureaucrats who would inevitably object to certain portrayals of past U.S. government activities. Though he faced some initial resistance to the establishment of the Atomic Energy Commission's Historical Advisory Committee, it was eventually approved by Strauss himself on the recommendation of one of Strauss's favorite academic historians.

Part of Hewlett's work in writing the AEC history was acquiring historical AEC records before they were destroyed, encouraging local AEC agencies and branches to think about their records in a historical manner, and marking historical records for depositing at the National Archives. Hewlett later recounted an incident in which he was called, as Chief Historian, to witness to opening of an old wartime filing cabinet found under a stairwell of an AEC building. After the locksmith had opened the cabinet, Hewlett reached in and the first document he pulled out was a letter signed by Franklin Delano Roosevelt. The cabinet turned out to be the wartime correspondence files of Vannevar Bush and James B. Conant, and is currently considered one of the most important collections of documents relating to Manhattan Project history.

After going over thousands of secret and formerly secret records, Hewlett eventually produced his first volume of the official history, covering the time period of the Manhattan Project through the formation of the AEC. The New World, 1939-1946 was published in 1962, and was a runner-up for the 1963 Pulitzer Prize. Hewlett continued his work and published the second volume, Atomic Shield, 1947-1952 in 1969, which received the David D. Lloyd prize from the Harry S. Truman Library Institute. For both of these books, Hewlett was awarded the Distinguished Employee Award by the AEC, the highest employee award given by the agency.

According to a later interview with Hewlett, he had difficulty in getting the final book cleared for publication by the United States Navy, because Admiral Hyman G. Rickover refused to allow it to be published unless Hewlett agreed to write an official history of the Nuclear Navy as well. Though irritated at the misuse of security clearances, Hewlett agreed and produced Nuclear Navy, 1946-1962 in 1974. Despite his initial irritation, Hewlett enjoyed working on the project as he was given unfettered access to any related files on account of having Rickover's personal backing.

After the AEC was dismantled in 1974, Hewlett became the Chief Historian of its successor organization, the Energy Research and Development Administration (ERDA). When ERDA itself was dismantled in 1977, his position was transferred to its successor, the Department of Energy. When the Three Mile Island accident occurred in 1979, Hewlett was asked to write a history of the event as it was unfolding. Hewlett was by then hoping to retire, however, and two other historians were recommended for the job, Philip L. Cantelon and Robert C. Williams. After the success by Cantelon and Williams in contracting themselves to the DOE, Hewlett, Cantelon, Williams, and Rodney P. Carlisle, then a visiting researcher at the DOE, together founded a private company devoted to writing commissioned official histories of government agencies, individuals, or private companies, named History Associates Incorporated and based in Rockville, Maryland.

Hewlett later said that only one time he attempted to be involved in AEC/DOE policymaking, writing up a history of the AEC's policies in handling nuclear waste, which he later said did not always portray the agency in a positive light. The document, completed in 1978, was essentially mothballed by the DOE and never followed up on.

Hewlett officially retired from government work in 1980 while he was still working on his third volume of AEC history. Because of institutional changes, Hewlett had difficulty getting the work approved for public release. Finally published in 1989 as Atoms for Peace and War, 1953-1961, the book won the Richard W. Leopold Prize from the Organization of American Historians as the best book of the year on a U.S. federal government agency. He died September 1, 2015, at Maplewood Park Place, a senior living community in Bethesda, Maryland.

Hewlett is today recognized as one of the most influential federal historians in the United States, and was a founding member of both the Society for History in the Federal Government and the National Council on Public History.

== Books by Hewlett ==
- Hewlett, Richard G., and Oscar E. Anderson. The New World, 1939-1946. University Park: Pennsylvania State University Press, 1962.
- ________, and Francis Duncan. Atomic Shield, 1947-1952. University Park: Pennsylvania State University Press, 1969.
- ________, and Francis Duncan. Nuclear Navy, 1946-1962. Chicago: University of Chicago Press, 1974.
- ________, and Jack M. Holl. Atoms for Peace and War, 1953-1961: Eisenhower and the Atomic Energy Commission. Berkeley: University of California Press, 1989.
