= Department of the Army Historical Advisory Committee =

The Department of the Army Historical Advisory Committee was established in January 1947 within the United States Army. In 1996, it was made a subcommittee of the Department of Defense Historical Advisory Committee.

== History ==
The Department of the Army Historical Advisory Committee is the oldest of the historical advisory committees within the U.S. Department of Defense. Its antecedents were the very short-lived Advisory Board on Historical Work to the Army War College's Historical Section in 1928-1930 and, more directly, a group of three civilians and three officers, who met from May 1943 to 1946 to draft plans for the Army's history of the Second World War that led to the creation of what would become the United States Army Center of Military History.

The Secretary of the Army appoints members, which includes civilian scholars as well as those who represent the United States Military Academy, the Army War College, the Command and General Staff College, and the Training and Doctrine Command. The committee meets annually to review and to advise on the current and future plans of the United States Army Center of Military History.

== Chairmen ==
The following, listed in chronological order, have served as chairmen of the committee. In those cases where individuals have also served as individual members, their names and dates are also shown separately for that service in the alphabetical list of members:

- James Phinney Baxter III, 1943–1955
- Henry Wriston, 1955–1956
- Elmer Ellis, 1957–1958
- Fred H. Harrington, 1959–1961
- Oran J. Hale, 1961–1962
- Fred C. Cole, 1963–1967
- Walter C. Langsam, 1967–1972
- Otis A. Singetary, 1972-
- Jon T. Sumida, 2003–2005

== Members ==
- Samuel Flagg Bemis, 1955–1958
- Charles B. Burdick, 1966–1971
- Edward M. Coffman, 1971-
- Harry L. Coles, 1975-
- Henry Steele Commager, 1943–1952
- Gordon A. Craig, 1953–1958
- Elmer Ellis, 1954–1956
- William H. Emerson, 1960–1965
- James A. Field, Jr., 1963–1968
- Douglas S. Freeman, 1947–1952
- Frank Freidel, 1973-
- Oron J. Hale, 1958–1960, 1963
- E. Pendleton Herring, 1943–1952
- John D. Hicks, 1947–1954
- W. Stull Holt, 1955–1960
- William T. Hutchinson, 1947–1956
- Richard W. Leopold, 1966–1971
- S. L. A. Marshall, 1947–1954
- Ernest R. May, 1964–1969
- Louis Morton, 1968–1972
- Peter Paret, 1971-
- Forrest C. Pogue, 1969–1974
- Earl S. Pomeroy, 1960–1965
- Charles P. Roland, 1964–1969
- Theodore Ropp, 1961–1966
- E. Dwight Salmon, 1947–1952
- Charles S. Snydor, 1950–1953
- Charles H. Taylor, 1947–1952
- Frank E. Vandiver, 1969–1974
- Russell F. Weigley, 1975-
- Bell I. Wiley, 1958–1963
- T. Harry Williams, 1955–1960
- C. Vann Woodward, 1957–1962
- Walter L. Wright, 1947–1949
- James Carafano, ?-

== Sources ==
- Richard W. Leopold, "Historians and the Federal Government: Historical Advisory Committees: State, Defense, and the Atomic Energy Commission," The Pacific Historical Review, vol. 44, No. 3. (Aug 1975), pp. 373–385.
