= Secretary of the Navy's Advisory Subcommittee on Naval History =

U.S. government advisory committee

The Secretary of the Navy's Advisory Subcommittee on Naval History was formally established in 1956 and was the second oldest of the historical advisory committee's within the United States Department of Defense. It was inactive from 2009 to 2010 and formally disestablished with the Naval Advisory Panel.

== History ==
Formally established as a committee of eleven civilians in 1956 as the Secretary of the Navy's Advisory Committee on Naval History, its direct and immediate antecedent was an ad hoc advisory committee that had met in 1952, 1954, and 1955. Its members were appointed by the Secretary of the Navy to review and advise on the current and future plans of both the Naval History and Heritage Command and the United States Marine Corps History Division of Marine Corps University. In 1996, the committee was made a subcommittee of the Department of Defense Historical Advisory Committee and reports directly to the Secretary of the Navy, and also to the Secretary of Defense through the Department of Defense Historical Advisory Committee.

== Chairmen ==
The following, listed in chronological order, have served as chairmen of the committee. In those cases where individuals have also served as individual members, their names and dates are also shown separately for that service in the alphabetical list of members:

- Waldo G. Leland, 1955–1964
- Elmer L. Kayser, 1970–1972
- Walter Muir Whitehill, 1972-
- Richard W. Leopold
- William D. Wilkinson
- David Alan Rosenberg, 1995–2005
- John Hattendorf, 2006–2008
- Robert B. Pirie, Jr., 2009-

== Members ==
The following is an alphabetical list of committee members, who have served since 1952, with their dates of service as members. Committee chairs are listed above with their dates as chairmen:

- Arthur D. Baker, III, 1985
- John D. Barnhardt, 1955–1963
- James Phinney Baxter III, 1952–1964
- CAPT Edward L. Beach, Jr., USN (ret.), 1992
- Whitfield J. Bell, jr, 1972–1980
- Samuel Flagg Bemis, 1955–1964
- David R. Bender, 1992
- Francis L. Berkeley, Jr., 1966–1982
- Julian P. Boyd, 1952–1966
- Marion L. Brewington, 1966–1974
- RADM Thomas A. Brooks, USN (ret.), 2003–2007
- CDR Wesley A. Brown, CEC, USN (ret.), 1996–2002
- Frank G. Burke, 1996–2002
- J. Revell Carr, 1996
- Charles C. Chadbourn, III, 2008-
- LTGEN G. Ronald Christmas, USMC (ret.), 2008-
- Edward E. Dale, 1952
- John C. Dann, 1992
- VADM Robert F. Dunn, 1996–2002
- VADM George W. Emery, USN (ret.), 1997–2006
- James T. Farrell, 1954
- James A. Field, Jr., 1980–1985
- RADM Mack C. Gaston, USN (ret.), -2007
- RADM Russell W. Gorman, USN (ret.), 1992–1996
- Jose-Marie Griffiths, 1996–2002
- Joy Bright Hancock, 1976–1985
- CAPT R. Robinson Harris, USN (ret.), 2002
- Caryl P. Haskins, 1970–1982
- John Hattendorf, 2004–2005
- Robert Henry, 1954
- Jim Dan Hill, 1954–1982
- RADM William J. Holland, Jr., USN (ret.), 2008-
- Christine Hughes, 2004-
- Donald D. Jackson, 1972–1980
- Beverely Schreiber Jacoby, 1996–2005
- Richard L. Jautras, 1992
- CAPT W. Spencer Johnson IV, USN (ret.), 2007-
- Richard L. Jutras, 1996
- RADM John T. Kavanaugh, SC, USN (ret.), - 2007
- Elmer L. Kayser, 1952–1976
- John H. Kemble, 1961–1985
- Tibor Kerekes, 1952
- RADM John M. Kersch, USN (ret.), 2002–2005
- VADM William P. Lawrence, USN (ret.), 1992
- Susan Livingstone, - 2007
- J. P. London, 2007-
- Burt Logan, 2003–2007
- Leonard W. Labaree, 1966–1969
- Waldo G. Leland, 1952–1964
- Richard W. Leopold, 1955–1982
- William E. Lingelbach, 1956–1960
- Augustus P. Loring, 1982–1985
- Dumas Malone, 1954
- Jan E. Mandeville, 1985
- Vera D. Mann, 1992–1996
- AMB J. William Middendorf II, 1992–1996
- VADM Gerald E. Miller, USN (ret.), 1992
- Elting E. Morison, 1972–1976
- Allan Nevins, 1956–1969
- Michael A. Palmer, - 2007
- Howard H. Peckham, 1972–1976
- Norman Polmar, 2007
- Forrest C. Pogue, 1970–1985
- Fred H. Rainbow, 2007-
- ADM J. Paul Reason, USN (ret.), 2008-
- James R. Reckner, 2002-
- Clark G. Reynolds, 1992-
- David Alan Rosenberg, 1993–2005
- MGEN Clifford L. Stanley, USMC (ret.), 2008-
- William Lloyd Stearman, 2004–2008
- Daniel F. Stella, 1992
- William N. Still, Jr., 1996–2005
- Gordon B. Turner, 1972–1980
- Betty Miller Unterberger, 1992–1996
- Walter P. Webb, 1954
- Walter Muir Whitehill, 1952–1972
- William D. Wilkinson, 1996
- Virginia Steele Wood, 2002 - 2007
- CAPT Channing M. Zucker, USN (ret.), 2007 -

== Charter ==
CHARTER OF THE SECRETARY OF THE NAVY’S ADVISORY SUBCOMMITTEE ON NAVAL HISTORY

- A. Official Designation: The Subcommittee shall be known as the Secretary of the Navy's Advisory Subcommittee on Naval History (hereinafter referred to as the SNAS).
- B. Background, Objectives, and Scope of Activities: Formally established as a committee of eleven civilians in 1956 as the Secretary of the Navy's Advisory Committee on Naval History, this body had as its direct and immediate antecedent an ad hoc advisory committee that met in 1952, 1954, and 1955. In 1996, the committee was made a subcommittee of the Department of Defense Historical Advisory Committee. The current SNAS reports to the Department of Defense Historical Advisory Committee through the Secretary of the Navy. The SNAS, under the provisions of the Federal Advisory Committee Act of 1972 (5 U.S.C., Appendix, as amended), shall provide independent advice and recommendations on matters pertaining to preserving the heritage and legacy of the Naval Service and disseminating its rich history to the Service and the American public, to include professional standards, methodology, program priorities, and cooperative relationships in the Marine Corps and Navy's historical research and publication, museum, archival, archeological, library, manuscript collection, rare book collection, art collection, preservation, and curatorial

activities. The Secretary of the Navy may act upon the SNAS's advice and recommendations.

- C. Committee Membership: The SNAS shall be composed of not more than fifteen members,

who are appointed by the Secretary of the Navy on the advice of the Assistant Secretary of the Navy (Installations & Environment). The SNAS shall submit nominations to the Assistant Secretary of the Navy (Installations & Environment). The Director of Naval History and the President of the Marine Corps University shall make their recommendations for membership to the SNAS, as a nominating committee. Nominees will include individuals who have broad managerial experience, vision, and understanding in one or more of the following areas: military and maritime history, archives, museology, art, library science, information technology. Members may also include former senior civilian Department of the Navy officials and retired Navy and Marine Corps personnel. Members appointed by the Secretary of the Navy, who are not Federal officers or employees, shall serve as Special Government Employees under the authority of 5 U.S.C. § 3109, and shall be appointed for a term of four years with the possibility of a one- to two-year extension. With the exception of travel and per diem for official travel, Subcommittee Members shall serve without compensation. The SNAS shall elect its own chair and vice-chair from its appointed members.

- D. Committee Meetings: The SNAS shall meet at the call of the Alternate Designated Federal

Officer, in consultation with the chairperson. The estimated number of SNAS meetings is one per year. The Alternate Designated Federal Officer shall be a full-time or permanent part-time DoD employee, and shall be appointed in accordance with established DoD policies and procedures. The Designated Federal Officer and/or Alternate Designated Federal Officer shall attend all SNAS meetings.

- E. Duration of the Subcommittee: The need for this advisory function is on a continuing basis; however, it is subject to renewal every two years.
- F. Agency Support: The Department of the Navy, through the Office of the Assistant Secretary of the Navy (Installations & Environment) shall provide support as deemed necessary for the performance of the committee's functions, and shall ensure compliance with the requirements of 5 U.S.C., Appendix, as amended.
- G. Termination Date: The Subcommittee shall terminate upon completion of its mission or two

years from the date this Charter is filed, whichever is sooner, unless it is extended by the Secretary of the Navy or the Department of Defense Historical Advisory Committee.

- H. Operating Costs: The operating costs will include travel costs and contract support for the SNAS. The estimated annual personnel support costs to the Department of Defense are 0.3 full-time equivalents (FTEs).
- I. Recordkeeping: The records of the SNAS shall be handled according to section 2, General

Records Schedule 26 and appropriate DoD policies and procedures. These records shall be available for public inspection and copying, subject to the Freedom of Information Act of 1966 (5 U.S.C. § 552, as amended).

- J. Charter/Revisions Approval Process: Subcommittees of the DoD Historical Advisory

Committee are authorized to approve their own charters but they cannot operate independently of the DoD Historical Advisory Committee. Regardless of the charter, SNAS remains a subcommittee of the parent committee. This Subcommittee Charter was initially approved unanimously by all SNAS members present at the SNAS executive session that took place on 12 September 2008. Revisions may be made with the concurrence of a vote of two-thirds of the appointed members and will be forwarded for information by the SNAS to the DoD Historical Advisory Committee when such revisions are made.

- K. Charter Filed: 12 September 2008.

== Sources ==
- Richard W. Leopold, "Historians and the Federal Government: Historical Advisory Committees: State, Defense, and the Atomic Energy Commission," The Pacific Historical Review, vol. 44, No. 3. (Aug 1975), pp. 373–385.
