= Robert H. Wiebe =

American historian

Robert Huddleston Wiebe (April 22, 1930 – December 10, 2000) was an American historian and bestselling author. He specialized in American business history.

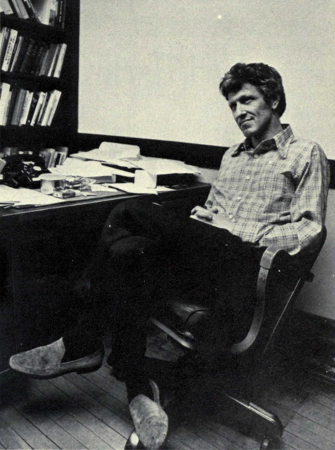
Robert H. Wiebe at Northwestern University, 1975

== Early life and education ==
Wiebe was born on April 22, 1930, in Amarillo, Texas, to Jean Huddleston Wiebe and Richard Wiebe. He graduated from Peoria High School in 1948 and Carleton College in 1951. In 1957, he received his PhD from the University of Rochester.

== Career ==
Though Wiebe taught briefly at Michigan State University and Columbia University, he spent most of his career at Northwestern University.

In 1981, he received the Guggenheim Fellowship. He also served as the Pitt Professor of American History and Institutions. He was a member of the American Historical Association (AHA) and the Organization of American Historians (OAH).

== Death ==
Wiebe died on December 10, 2000, in Evanston, Illinois.

== Personal life ==
Wiebe was married to Allene Davis, with whom he had three sons.

== Selected works ==
=== Books ===
- Businessmen and Reform: A Study of the Progressive Movement (1962)
- The Search for Order, 1877–1920 (1967)
- The Segmented Society: An Introduction to the Meaning of America (1975)
- The Opening of American Society: From the Adoption of the Constitution to the Eve of Disunion (1984)
- Self-Rule: A Cultural History of American Democracy (1995)
- Who We Are: A History of Popular Nationalism (2002)

=== Scholarly articles ===
- "Business disunity and the progressive movement, 1901-1914." Mississippi Valley Historical Review 44.4 (1958): 664–685. online
- "The House of Morgan and the Executive, 1905-1913." American Historical Review 65.1 (1959): 49–60. online
- "The anthracite strike of 1902: A record of confusion." Mississippi Valley Historical Review 48.2 (1961): 229–251. online
- "The social functions of public education." American Quarterly 21.2 (1969): 147–164. online
