= Anne Firor Scott =

American historian (1921–2019)

Anne Firor Scott (April 24, 1921 – February 5, 2019) was an American historian, specializing in the history of women and of the South.

== Early life and education ==
Scott was born April 24, 1921, in Montezuma, Georgia.

She earned her PhD from Radcliffe College of Harvard University in 1958.

== Career ==
Scott was appointed to the Citizen's Advisory Council on the status of women in 1965.

She taught part-time at both Duke University and the University of North Carolina at Chapel Hill, before teaching full-time at Duke University. In 1980 she became the first female chair of the history department at Duke. She retired from teaching at Duke in the early 1990s.

She was the president of the Organization of American Historians from 1983 to 1984, and the president of the Southern Historical Association in 1989.

== Bibliography ==
- The Southern Lady: From Pedestal to Politics, 1830–1930 (1970) ISBN 9780226743479
- Women in American Life (1970)
- The American woman: who was she? (Eyewitness accounts of American history series) (1971) ISBN 9780130322357
- One Half the People: The Fight for Woman Suffrage (with Andrew M. Scott) (1975) ISBN 9780397473335
- "What, then, is the American; this new woman?" (1978) doi:10.2307/1901418
- Women in American History : a Bibliography (Scott only wrote the introduction; the editor is Cynthia E. Harrison) (1979) ISBN 9780874362602
- Making the Invisible Woman Visible (1984) ISBN 9780252011238
- "Women in the South", with Jacquelyn Dowd Hall in Interpreting Southern History: Historiographical Essays in Honor of Sanford W. Higginbotham, ed. John B. Boles and Evelyn T. Nolen (Baton Rouge, 1987), 454–509. ISBN 9780807113189
- Foreword, When the World Ended: The Diary of Emma LeConte (Earl Schenck Miers is the editor and Emma LeConte is the author) (1987)
- Virginia Women: The First Two Hundred Years (with Suzanne Lebsock) (1988) ISBN 9780879350765
- Natural Allies: Women's Associations in American History (1992) ISBN 9780252063206
- Foreword, The Hard-Boiled Virgin (Frances Newman is the author of the book) (1993) ISBN 9780820305264
- Unheard Voices: The First Historians of Southern Women (1993) ISBN 9780813914329
- Introduction, Women's Life and Work in the Southern Colonies (Author is Julia Cherry Spruill) (1998)
- Introduction, Votes for Women: A 75th Anniversary Album (Authors are Ellen DuBois and Karen Kearns) (1999) ISBN 9780873281577
- Southern Women and Their Families in the 19th Century Papers and Diaries Microform (Research Collections in Women's Studies) (Anne Firor Scott, Daniel Lewis, and Martin Paul Schipper were editors; authors are University Publications of America and University of Texas at Austin Center for American History) (2000) ISBN 9781556552946
- The Road to Seneca Falls: Elizabeth Cady Stanton and the First Woman's Rights Convention (author is Judith Wellman; Anne Firor Scott and Nancy Hewitt were editors) (Women in American History Series) (2005) ISBN 9780252071737
- Pauli Murray and Caroline Ware: Forty Years of Letters in Black and White (2006) ISBN 9780807859285
- Lucy Somerville Howorth: New Deal Lawyer, Politician, and Feminist from the South (with Dorothy S. Shawhan and Martha H. Swain) (2011) ISBN 9780807138762
- Preface, Never Ask Permission: Elisabeth Scott Bocock of Richmond, A Memoir by Mary Buford Hitz (Author is Mary Buford Hitz) (2012)

== Honors ==
- Honorary degrees from Northwestern University, Radcliffe College, Queens College, and the University of the South
- Berkshire Conference Prize in 1980
- University Medal for Distinguished Meritorious Services, from Duke University in 1991
- Organization of American Historians' Distinguished Service Award in 2002
- Fellow of the American Academy of Arts and Sciences in 2004
- American Historical Association’s Scholarly Achievement Award in 2008
- 2013 National Humanities Medal (awarded in 2014)

== Legacy ==
The Anne Firor Scott papers, 1963–2002, are held at Duke University.

In 1992, the Organization of American Historians established the annual Lerner-Scott Prize, named for Scott and Gerda Lerner. It is awarded annually to the writer of the best doctoral dissertation that year in U.S. women's history.

Visible Women: New Essays on American Activism, a collection of essays drawing inspiration from Scott's 1984 work, Making the Invisible Woman Visible, was published in 1993.

Writing Women's History: A Tribute to Anne Firor Scott was published in 2011. It contains essays on how women's history is written in the wake of Scott's book The Southern Lady: From Pedestal to Politics, 1830–1930. Edited by Elizabeth Anne Payne, the collection has contributions from Scott herself, Laura F. Edwards, Crystal Feimster, Glenda E. Gilmore, Jacquelyn Dowd Hall, Darlene Clark Hine, Mary Kelley, Markeeva Morgan, Laurel Thatcher Ulrich, and Deborah Gray White. It is based on papers presented at the University of Mississippi's annual Chancellor Porter L. Fortune Symposium in Southern History.
