= Pitt Professor of American History and Institutions =

Named professorship at University of Cambridge

The Pitt Professorship of American History and Institutions was established at the University of Cambridge on 5 February 1944 from a sum of £44,000 received from the Syndics of the Cambridge University Press in 1943 and augmented by a further £5,000 in 1946. The title of the chair was changed to the Pitt Professorship of American History and Institutions in 1951.

The professorship is unusual in that tenure is for a period of one year only.

== List of Pitt Professors of American History and Institutions ==
- 1945–46 Dexter Perkins
- 1946–47 No election
- 1947–48 Henry Steele Commager
- 1948–49 Roy Franklin Nichols
- 1949–50 Walt Whitman Rostow
- 1950–51 John Donald Hicks
- 1951–53 Ralph Henry Gabriel
- 1952–53 Avery Odelle Craven
- 1953–54 Corwin D. Edwards
- 1954–55 John Bartlet Brebner
- 1955–56 William Thomas Easterbrook
- 1956–57 Edward Chase Kirkland
- 1957–58 Paul Abraham Freund
- 1958–59 Richard Hofstadter
- 1959–60 Eugene Victor Rostow
- 1960–61 Clinton Lawrence Rossiter
- 1961–62 Richard Palmer Blackmur
- 1962–63 John Hope Franklin
- 1963–64 John Morton Blum
- 1964–65 Daniel Joseph Boorstin
- 1965–66 Thomas Childs Cochran
- 1966–67 Peter Michael Blau
- 1967–68 James Willard Hurst
- 1968–69 William Clement Eaton
- 1969–70 Henry David
- 1970–71 Walter Galenson
- 1971–72 Henry Farnham May
- 1972–73 Morris Janowitz
- 1973–74 Eric Louis McKitrick
- 1974–75 Archibald Cox
- 1975–76 Robert William Fogel
- 1976–77 Eugene Dominic Genovese
- 1977–78 Paul Allan David
- 1978–79 Stephan Thernstrom
- 1979–80 Eliot Freidson
- 1980–81 Eric Foner
- 1981–82 Douglass Cecil North
- 1982–83 Gordon Stewart Wood
- 1983–84 Judith N. Shklar
- 1984–85 Robert Huddleston Wiebe
- 1985–86 Peter Temin
- 1986–87 Bernard Bailyn
- 1987–88 Daniel Bell
- 1988–89 Warren Forbes Kimball
- 1989–90 Nathan Rosenberg
- 1990–91 Timothy Hall Breen
- 1991–92 Vacant
- 1992–93 Carol Gilligan
- 1993–94 Michael Fitzgibbon Holt
- 1994–95 Peter Gavin Wright
- 1995–96 Dan Thomas Carter
- 1996–97 John Shelton Reed
- 1997–98 Sylvia R. Frey
- 1998–99 Stanley Engerman
- 1999–2000 James Tyler Petterson
- 2000–01 Randall Collins
- 2001–02 James L. Roark
- 2002–03 Timothy W Guinnane
- 2003–04 Daniel T. Rodgers
- 2004–05 Michael Mann
- 2005–06 Mary Beth Norton
- 2006–07 Michael D. Bordo
- 2007–08 J Mills Thornton
- 2008–09 James T. Kloppenberg
- 2009–10 Nancy A. Hewitt
- 2010–11 Gary Libecap
- 2011–12 Alan Brinkley
- 2012–13 Jeffrey C. Alexander
- 2013–14 David Blight
- 2014–15 Barry Eichengreen
- 2015–16 Margaret Jacobs
- 2016–17 Loïc Wacquant
- 2017–18 Ira Katznelson
- 2018–19 Naomi Lamoreaux
- 2019–20 Heather Ann Thompson
- 2020–21 Theresa A. Singleton
- 2021–22 Kathleen M. Brown
- 2022–23 John Wallis (Economic historian, University of Maryland)
- 2023–24 Erika Lee
- 2024–25 Eduardo Bonilla-Silva
- 2025–26 Beth Bailey
- 2026–27 Chris Meissner (Economic historian, UC Davis)
