= Millen House =

Historic house in Indiana, United States

- U.S. National Register of Historic Places
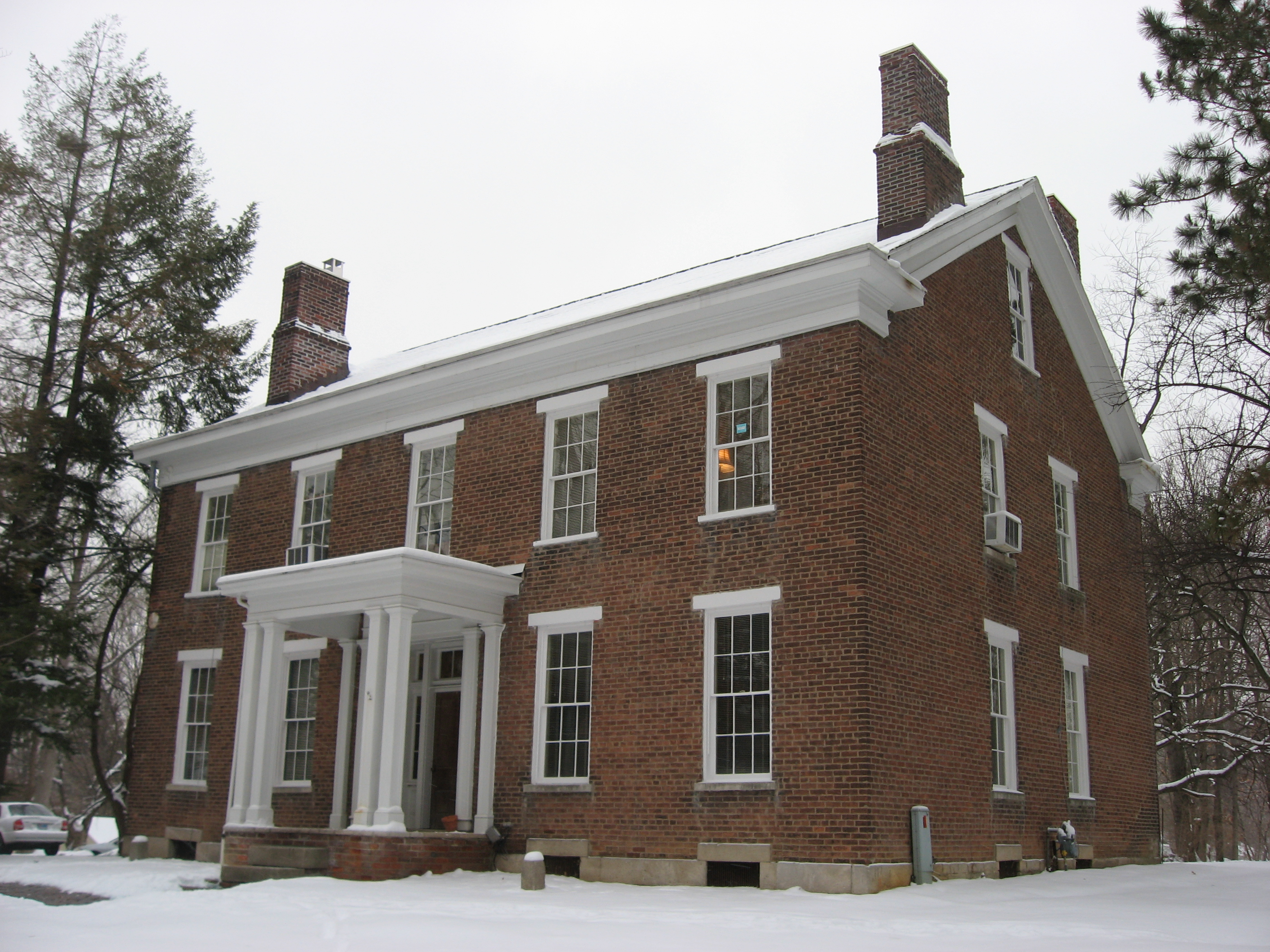
- Front and eastern side of the house

- Location within Indiana Location within the United States
- Location: 112 N. Bryan Ave., Bloomington, Indiana
- Coordinates: 39°10′2″N 86°30′28″W
- Area: Less than 1 acre (0.40 ha)
- Built: 1845
- Architectural style: Greek Revival
- NRHP reference No.: 04001104
- Added to NRHP: September 29, 2004

The Millen House (also known as "Raintree House") is a historic residence on the campus of Indiana University in Bloomington, Indiana, United States. Built by an early farmer, it is one of Bloomington's oldest houses, and it has been named a historic landmark.

The Raintree House is a Greek Revival style brick house. The house gets its name from two large raintrees (Koelreuteria paniculata), which once stood on the property. Built by William Moffett Millen c. 1845, it is an example of the Georgian house plan favored by well-to-do farmers in southern Indiana and the Upland South in the mid-nineteenth century.

== Millen family ==
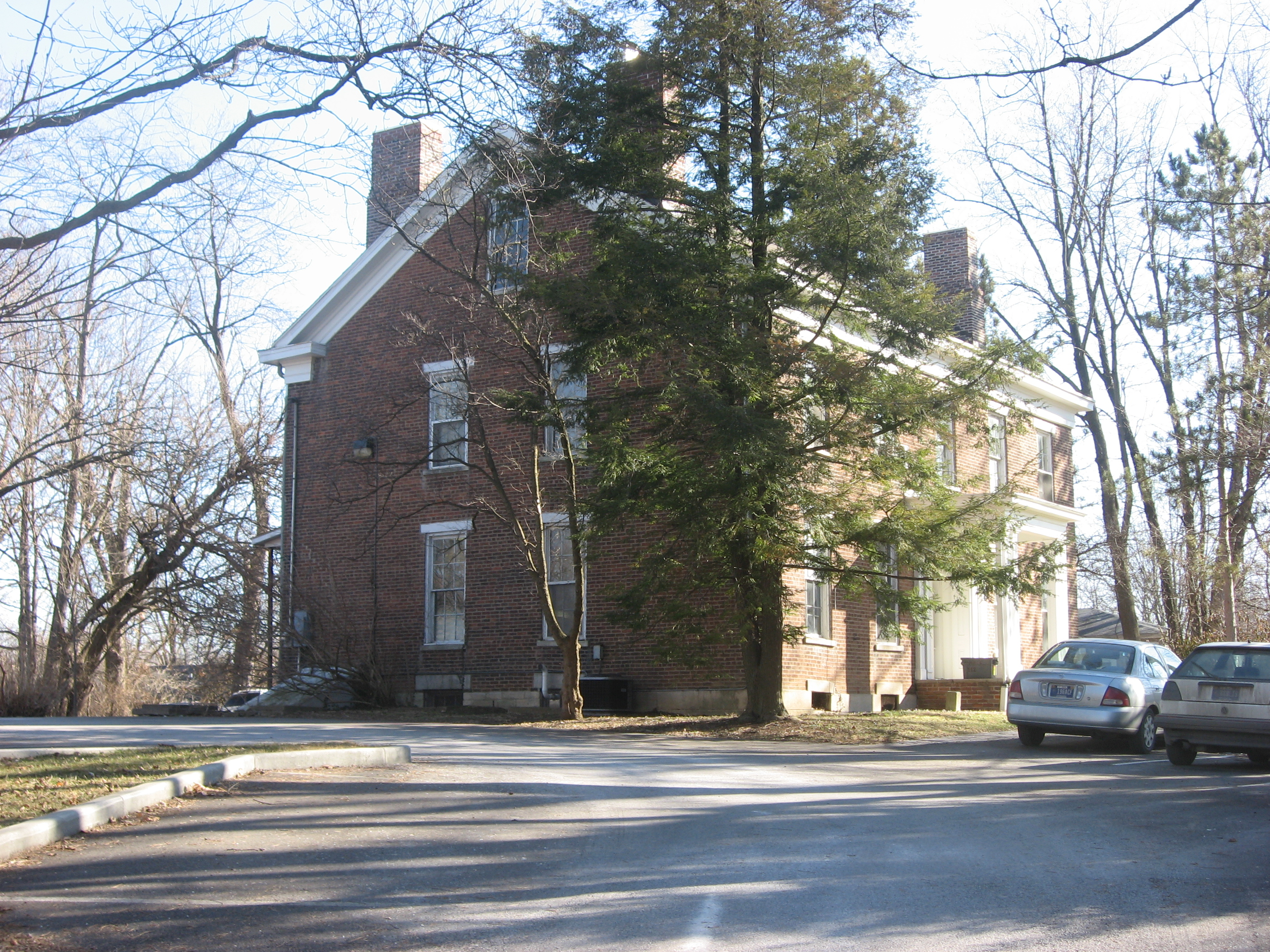
Street view

Born in 1801 in Chester District, South Carolina, William Moffett Millen married the former Eleanor McGill, a native of Xenia, Ohio, and moved to Bloomington circa 1833. He was one of many Scotch-Irish South Carolinians who moved to the Bloomington region around this time; these individuals fled north because of their opposition to the slavery system prevalent in South Carolina at the time. Most of these people, including Millen, were members of small Presbyterian denominations: the Associate, Associate Reformed, and Reformed Presbyterian Churches. These three denominations were very similar to each other: the Reformed and Associate churches left the Church of Scotland due to what they believed to be that denomination's departure from biblical teachings; and the Associate Reformed Church was formed by a partial merger of the other two denominations in 1782, from which some members of both sides remained separate and reorganized their denominations as they were before the merger. Because of their shared heritage, the members of the three denominations were culturally very similar and maintained social ties across their religious differences. When the Reformed Presbyterian Church's governing body banned slavery in 1800, its members complied with the decision almost unanimously, becoming fervent abolitionists; although the Associate Reformed Presbyterian Church in the South never spoke officially on the subject, many of its members were in agreement with the Reformed Presbyterians. As the economy of upland South Carolina faltered in the 1820s, many members of these churches began to sell their small farms and move to free states.

An abolitionist Associate Reformed Presbyterian, Millen chose to move to the recently founded town of Bloomington, which had been started fifteen years earlier as the home of the Indiana State Seminary. Although isolated from transportation routes such as the Ohio River, the town was growing as a center of education and as the commercial and political hub of Monroe County. When Millen and his family settled in Bloomington, they found a population of approximately seven hundred residents. Millen purchased one quarter section of land between the Nashville and Columbus Roads. Here, he and his wife and three children built a log cabin; on their farm, the family grew such crops as corn, wheat, oats, and potatoes; among their livestock were thirty-five cattle, a number significantly greater than the typical small farmer of the period could own. Besides farming, the Millens operated a kiln, which they used to manufacture bricks for multiple significant buildings in the city. As the years passed, the farm was expanded; by 1860, the farm had grown to 320 acres (130 ha), twice its original size.

== Construction and architecture ==
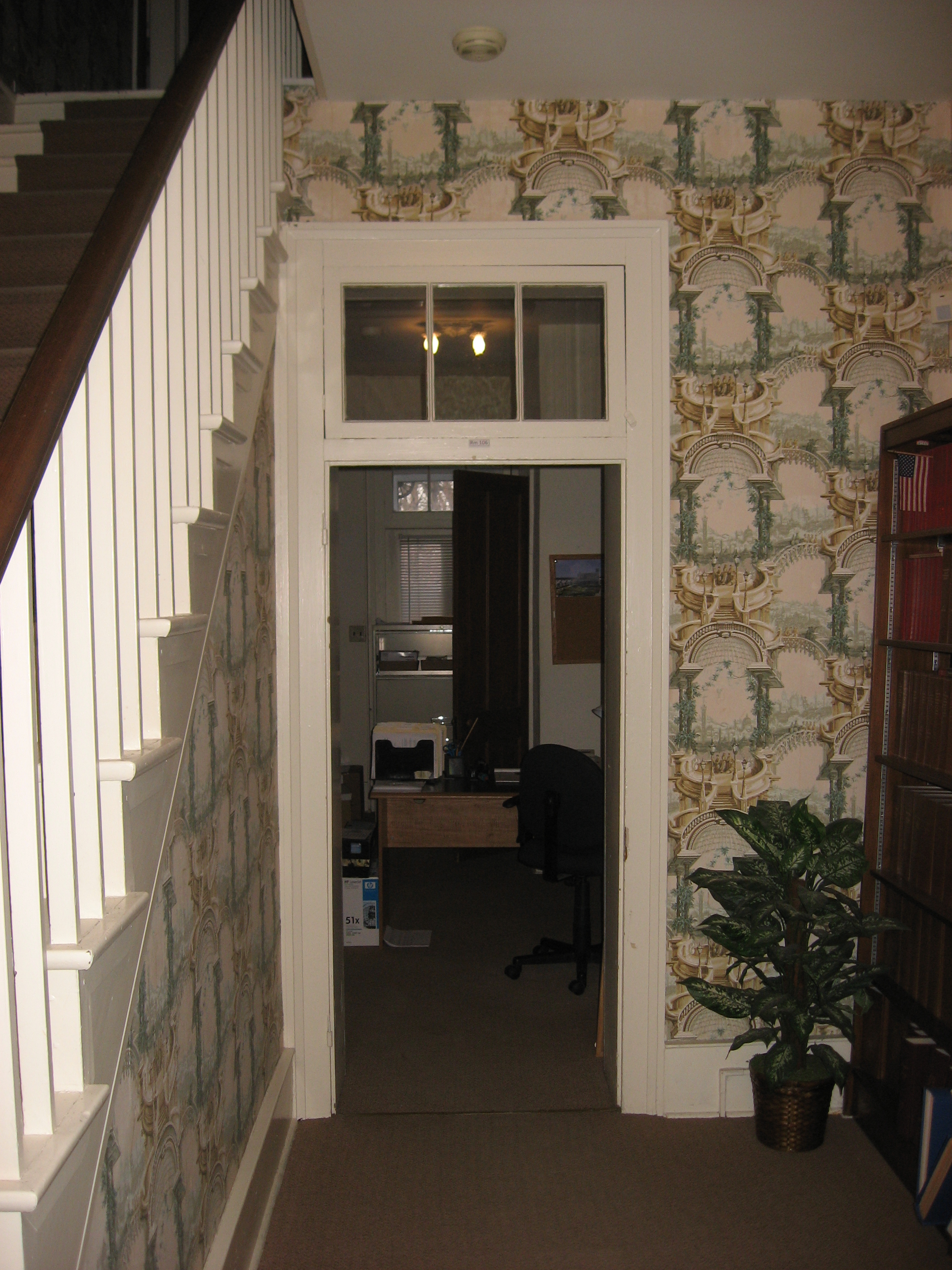
First-floor hallway

As his prosperity grew, William Millen erected a far larger house in 1845. Replacing the original log cabin was a sizeable Georgian residence with Greek Revival influences, built primarily of bricks from his own kiln. Such a house demonstrates the prosperity of its builder: the first houses in the city were much simpler structures in vernacular forms such as the hall and parlor and the I-house, and styles such as the Georgian and Greek Revival represented the increasing influence of Eastern sophistication. Located on N. Bryan Avenue, the house is a two-story building constructed of hand-pressed bricks; it rests on a limestone foundation and features significant amounts of framing made of tuliptree wood. The load-bearing walls of the interior, also built of brick, range from 8 to 12 inches (20 to 30 cm) in thickness; some wooden frame, including a central beam 1.5 feet (0.46 m) thick, also supports the house.

Millen's house is a rectangular building planned in a highly symmetrical fashion. All of its twenty-seven windows (each the same size as all of the others) are arranged in a regular fashion around the entrances on the five-bay northern and southern fronts of the house and on both of its three-bay ends. Two chimneys are located on each of the two ends, with one on either side of the peak of the roof. Regularity of design is also evidenced on the inside, in which each floor is divided into four rooms with a central hallway; each room features a fireplace and entrances to the hallway and to the adjacent room. Few ornate architectural details are present in the house; the most prominent of those that exist are the four Doric pillars of the small front porch and a simple cornice at the base of the porch roof. Throughout the interior, elements such as the fireplaces, woodworking, window glass, and molding are original to the house, although all of the fireplaces have been modified to prevent their use as fireplaces.

== After construction ==
Although a member of the Associate Reformed Presbyterian Church, Millen was closely associated with leading members of the Bloomington Reformed Presbyterian Church, which was founded twelve years before his arrival in Monroe County. Due to their fiercely abolitionist position, Reformed Presbyterian leaders such as Thomas Smith and James Faris, the congregation's first minister, were active participants in the local Underground Railroad movement. Because these men, like Millen, lived on farms east of town, it is possible that he collaborated with them. Local tradition has regarded the Millen House as an active station on the Underground Railroad; while no proof has been found for such a position, the close distance between these three farms makes such a situation more likely.

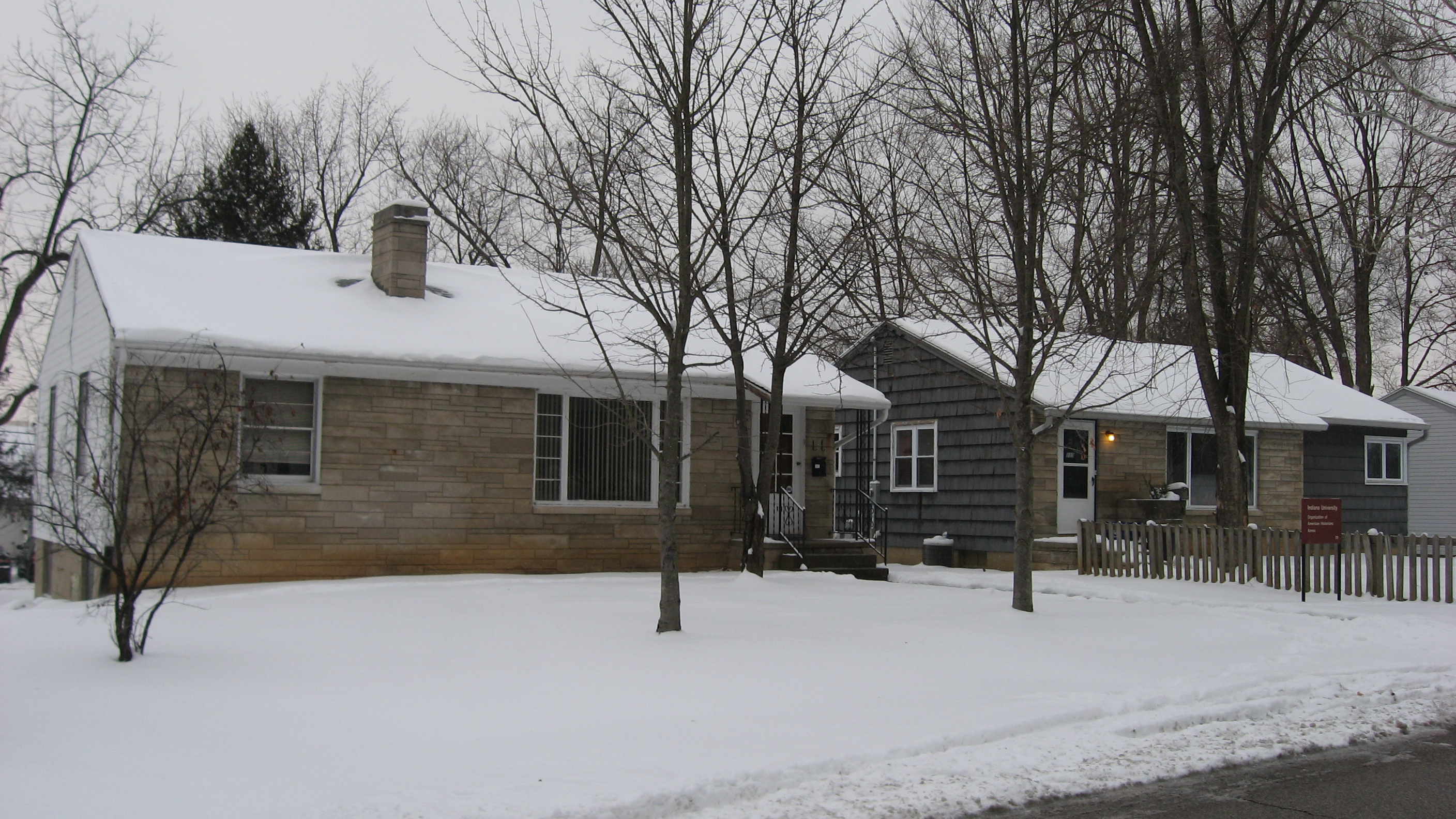
Typical houses on the former Millen farm

William Millen sold his house and farm to another local farmer, James Clark, in 1880. From this point, the family's history is divided and somewhat obscure: both Millen sons moved to the Great Plains, William and his daughter Eliza remained in Monroe County, where they are buried, and Eleanor's date of death, place of death, and place of burial are all shrouded in mystery. Clark owned the land for just two years, selling it to a farming family named Rogers, which remained on the property until 1900. In that year, the farm was purchased at auction by Henry and Minnie Lee for slightly less than $4,000 — substantially less than the $8,500 for which Millen had sold it or the $12,000 for which the Rogers had bought it. As Bloomington began to grow eastward, the Lees' land rose in value; they sold the land to another couple in 1923, who platted and sold most of the farm for residential purposes, and who quickly sold the house itself for $7,500 (~$107,187 in 2024) to Indiana University professor Agnes Wells. For most of her time as owner, Wells rented the house to university students. Another couple bought the house in 1944 but sold it to the university two years later. At that time, the G.I. Bill led to vastly increased enrollment; therefore, the university used the residence to house faculty and staff, and the surrounding neighborhood was purchased for student housing. The last private owner, Ann Stallknecht, bought the property in 1950; in 1969, she sold the property back to the university, which has owned it since that time.

Shortly after the property reverted to university ownership, history professor Thomas D. Clark became the executive secretary of the Organization of American Historians. Working with university president Herman B Wells, Clark arranged for the organization's headquarters to be moved into the Millen House in 1970, where they have remained to the present day. Today, the organization primarily refers to it as the "Raintree House," a name derived from two large raintrees that were formerly located on the grounds.

== Recognition ==
Only three other Georgian houses from the early and middle nineteenth century survive in Bloomington and the surrounding area; two of them have been modified greatly, and the third is collapsing, making the Millen House one of Monroe County's earliest and best preserved residences. Between 1999 and 2001, historic preservation officials working with the city of Bloomington surveyed the entire city and identified over two thousand buildings that were deemed to be historic to one extent or another. The house is referred to as the Millen-Stallknecht House, #105-055-80021 in City of Bloomington Historic Sites and Structures Inventory.

Because of its well-preserved historic architecture and its place in the settlement of the region, the Millen House was given the rating of "Outstanding"; the highest of the ratings given by the survey, it was accorded to less than three percent of the city's historic buildings. Key to the criteria for an Outstanding rating was that a property be likely to pass the criteria for addition to the National Register of Historic Places. In recognition of this status, more extensive research into the house's history was performed in the early 2000s, and the Millen House was listed on the National Register on September 29, 2004. It is one of forty properties and historic districts in Monroe County with this distinction.
