= William E. Connelley =

William Elsey Connelley
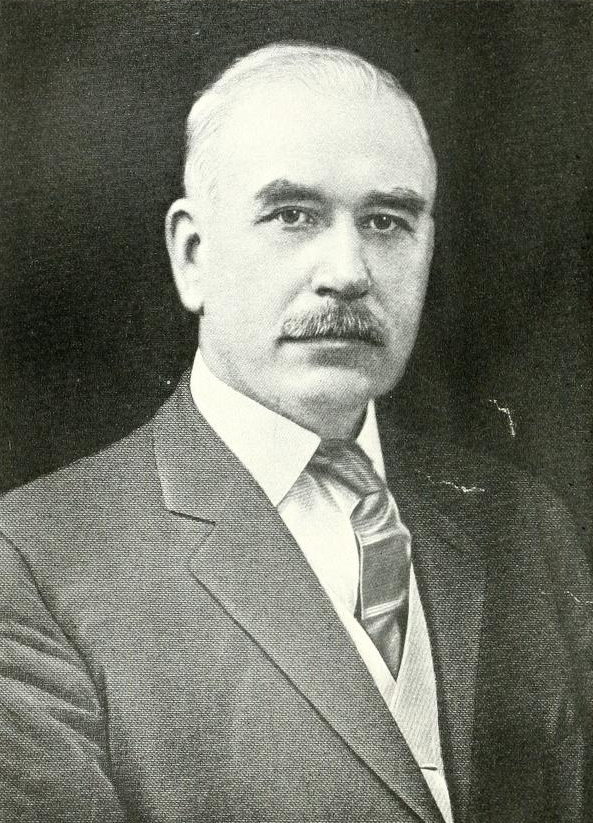
- Born: March 15, 1855; Johnson County, Kentucky
- Died: July 15, 1930 (aged 75); Topeka, Kansas
- Occupations: school teacher, historian
- Years active: 1872-1930
- Known for: various historical books on Kansas history

Signature
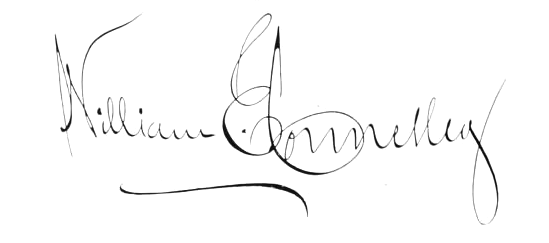

William Elsey Connelley (March 15, 1855 - July 15, 1930) was an American writer, historian and school teacher. He is best known for a series of books that document the history of Kansas, the Civil War, and the United States in the 19th and early 20th centuries.

== Biography ==
William E. Connelley was born in Johnson County, Kentucky. He was self-educated but he taught school in Johnson County between 1872 and 1880. He moved to Wyandotte County, Kansas, and lived in Bonner Springs, teaching until 1882. Connelley then moved on to other pursuits. He attended the Wyandotte County Normal Institute and received a teaching certificate. He worked for a time as a farmhand.

Connelley served a term as deputy county clerk and in 1883 was elected county clerk and served two terms, leaving office in 1887. He held a variety of jobs after that. In 1899 he was given the power of attorney to act in behalf of the Wyandotte Indian Tribe, then in Indian Territory, modern-day Oklahoma. He was to represent the tribe in the sale of Huron Cemetery. The land was to become a public building and the graves were to be moved. Objections were raised and the deal fell through.

In the 1890s Connelley became interested in a hobby of historical research, and in the subsequent years, he published a number of non-fiction books about history. Some of his most important books were The Provisional Government of Nebraska Territory (1899), Quantrill and the Border Wars (1909), Eastern Kentucky Papers (1910), Life of Preston Plumb (1913), a five volume History of Kansas (1917), a five volume History of Kentucky (1922) and Indian Myths (1928).

Quantrill and the Border Wars has been used by historical researchers ever since and this book has been reprinted at least twice since Connelley's death. Connelley's books were full of details and included much material obtained in interviews with persons present at historical situations about which the author wrote. One criticism has been that at times Connelley failed to properly document where his material was obtained and sometimes this material could not be verified by later researchers.

Connelley's works became well known in the historical community and he became president of the Kansas State Historical Society in 1912 and its secretary in 1914. Connelley served as the Society's secretary the rest of his life. He was also the president of the Kansas Authors Club (1908–1909), as well as the president of the Mississippi Valley Historical Association (1921–1922).

== Legacy ==
Connelley left much material on various historical subjects. Most of his books and some of his research notes are located in the archives of the Kansas Historical Society in Topeka, Kansas. Many of Connelley's papers are also held by the Kansas City Kansas Public Library's Special Collections, the Denver Public Library, Truman State University in Kirksville, Missouri, the University of Kansas Kenneth Spencer Research Library in Lawrence, Kansas, and the University of Oklahoma library system in Norman, Oklahoma.

== Selected works ==
=== Authored ===
- 1899. James Henry Lane, the "Grim Chieftain" of Kansas. Topeka, KS: Crane & Company.
- 1899. Wyandot Folk-lore. Topeka, KS: Crane & Company.
- 1900. John Brown. Topeka, KS: Crane & Company.
- 1900. Kansas Territorial Governors. Topeka, KS: Crane & Company.
- 1901. The Overland State to California (with Frank A. Root). Topeka, KS: Crane & Company.
- 1907. Doniphan's Expedition and the Conquest of New Mexico and California. Topeka, KS: s.p.
- 1909. Ingalls of Kansas: A Character Study. Topeka, KS: s.p.
- 1910. Eastern Kentucky Papers. New York City: The Torch Press.
- 1910. Quantrill and the Border Wars. Cedar Rapids: The Torch Press.
- 1913. The Life of Preston B. Plumb, 1837-1891. Chicago: Browne & Howell Company.
- 1916. History of Kansas Newspapers. Topeka, KS: Kansas State Historical Society and Archives.
- 1918. Standard History of Kansas and Kansans. Vols. I, II, III, IV, & V. Chicago: Lewis Publishing Company.
- 1922. History of Kentucky (with E. M. Coulter). Vols. I, II, III, IV, & V. Chicago: The American Historical Society.
- 1928. Indian Myths. New York City: Rand McNally.
- 1933. Wild Bill and His Era: The Life & Adventures of James Butler Hickok. New York City: Press of the Pioneers.

=== Edited ===
- 1899. The Provisional Government of Nebraska Territory. Lincoln, NE: Nebraska State Historical Society.
