= Department of Defense Historical Advisory Committee =

Department of Defense Historical Advisory Committee was chartered on 24 Jan 1996. Its purpose is to provide advice to the United States Secretary of Defense and the Secretaries of the military departments regarding the professional standards, historical methodology, program priorities, liaison with professional groups and institutions, and adequacy of resources connected with the various historical programs and associated activities of the U.S. Department of Defense.

The Committee has combined under it the previously separate advisory committees of the separate military departments and created them as advisory sub-committee's for each of the military services, reporting to their service secretaries and to the Department of Defense Historical Advisory Committee:

- Department of the Army Historical Advisory Committee
- Secretary of the Navy's Advisory Subcommittee on Naval History
- Secretary of the Air Force Historical Advisory Committee
