= Theodore Saloutos =

American historian (1910–1980)

- Born: August 3, 1910; Milwaukee, Wisconsin, U.S.
- Died: November 15, 1980 (aged 70); Los Angeles, California, U.S.
- Occupation: Historian

Academic background
- Education: Wisconsin State Teachers College–Milwaukee (BA 1933); University of Wisconsin (PhD 1940)
- Doctoral advisor: John D. Hicks

Academic work
- Discipline: United States history
- Sub-discipline: Agricultural history; History of immigration
- Institutions: University of California, Los Angeles (1945–1978)

Theodore Saloutos (August 3, 1910 – November 15, 1980) was an American historian. His areas of research included agrarian politics and agrarian reform movements, immigration studies, and Greek immigration to the United States. He taught at the University of California, Los Angeles from 1945 until retiring emeritus in 1978, and he served as the president of the Agricultural History Society 1965–1966, the Immigration History Society 1973–1976, and the Pacific Coast Branch of the American Historical Association at the time of his death in 1980.

== Early life ==
Saloutos was born in Milwaukee, Wisconsin on August 3, 1910. His parents were immigrants from Greece.

Saloutos was awarded a BA in 1933 from Milwaukee State Teacher’s College. He took a Ph.D. in history from the University of Wisconsin in 1940. His doctoral advisor was John D. Hicks, and his doctoral work served as a main part of his first major book, published in 1951: Agricultural Discontent in the Middle West, 1900-1939.

== Career ==
Early in his career Saloutos taught at Waukesha, Wisconsin public schools and then at Oberlin College.

In 1945 he became a lecturer in the Department of History at the University of California, Los Angeles, becoming a full professor in 1955. He stayed there until his retirement in 1978. He was particularly remembered for his U.S. history survey courses at the undergraduate level, and he advised 25 PhDs. He was known for his research on agrarian politics, agrarian reform movements, immigration studies, and Greek immigration to the United States.

His first book, the Agricultural Discontent in the Middle West, 1900-1939 (1951, co-authored with his doctoral advisor John D. Hicks), was called a "model of objectivity" and a new standard work alongside Solon J. Buck's The Granger Movement on the National Grange and Hicks's prior The Populist Revolt on U.S. Populism of the 1890s.

Between 1965 and 1966 Saloutos was president of the Agricultural History Society. He was awarded a 1966 Guggenheim Fellowship. In 1973 he was elected president of the Immigration History Society 1973–1976. He was serving as president of the Pacific Coast Branch of the American Historical Association when he died.

== Personal life and death ==
Saloutos married Florence Schwefel in 1940. They had several children and grandchildren.

He died on November 15, 1980, in Los Angeles, California.

== Legacy ==
Saloutos is the namesake of annual book awards from both the Agricultural History Society and the Immigration and Ethnic History Society.

== Selected publications ==
- Hicks, John D.; Saloutos, Theodore (1951). Agricultural Discontent in the Middle West, 1900-1939. University of Wisconsin Press.
  - Reprinted in paperback as Twentieth Century Populism: Agricultural Discontent in the Middle West, 1900-1939 by the University of Nebraska Press.
- (1960) Farmer movements in the South, 1865-1933 online
- (1964) The Greeks of the United States
- (1968) Populism: Reaction or Reform?
- (1982) The American Farmer and the New Deal
