= George E. Mowry =

American historian

George Edwin Mowry
- Born: October 5, 1909; Washington D.C., U.S.
- Died: May 12, 1984 (aged 74)
- Education: Miami University; University of Wisconsin–Madison
- Occupation: Historian

George Edwin Mowry (September 5, 1909 – May 12, 1984) was an American historian focusing primarily on the Progressive Era. As a professor at UCLA and the University of North Carolina at Chapel Hill, he taught large classes and directed over 50 PhD dissertations. Mowry published five books, co-authored six others and edited three books. He published 10 book chapters, over 50 encyclopedia articles and over 100 book reviews in magazines and professional journals. He joined John Donald Hicks as coauthor of a highly successful university textbook. He was active in many organizations, especially the Organization of American Historians. His interpretation of the middle-class foundation of the Progressive Era remains influential.

== Early life and education ==
Mowry was born in Washington D.C., the son of James Reilly Mowry and Ibby (Green) Mowry. He grew up in Ohio, attending high school and graduating from Miami University in 1933. Teachers in high school and college exposed him to the Populist Movement, causing him to enroll at the University of Wisconsin–Madison to work with John Donald Hicks for his master's degree (1934) and doctorate (1938) with a dissertation on "Theodore Roosevelt and the Progressive Movement ." Historian Keith M. Heim believes that Mowry's Midwestern background and personality influenced his interest in reform movements. Heim says Mowry showed a "disdain for elites and social pretense" and an "impatience with bureaucracies". In 1937 Mowry married La Verne Raasch, a fellow graduate student majoring in English.

== Professional roles ==
=== Teacher ===
Mowry taught thousands of undergraduates and mentored over fifty doctoral students in his career. He allowed graduate students to "make their own decisions and use my own intervention as little as possible in making those decisions.". He worked vigorously with his students when they were selecting their dissertation topics to urge them to select something "significant" but also allowed students to select topics that could succeed without intrusive supervision. His own mentor, John D. Hicks, had played a similar role for Mowry and encouraged him to not write on a second rate figure but rather to find a "big subject." When Mowry suggested the Progressive Movement, Hicks said, "Fine, go ahead. That's big enough!"

Mowry's first teaching position was as an instructor then an assistant professor at the University of North Carolina at Chapel Hill from 1938 to 1942. During World War II, he worked as a policy analyst for the Army Quartermaster Corps and then for the War Production Board from 1942 to 1944. Mills College in California invited Mowry to become their May Treat Morrison Professor of American History. He taught there from fall 1944 to 1947 and published Theodore Roosevelt and the Progressive Movement (1946) and did most of the research for his next book, The California Progressives (1951).

He left California for a professorship at the University of Iowa but in 1950 he returned to California this time as a full professor of history at the University of California at Los Angeles. He served as professor, department chair, (1955-1967) and also Dean of the Division of Social Sciences (1959-1967). He wrote The Era of Theodore Roosevelt (1958) and The Urban Nation (1965) and co-authored three additional books while at UCLA. He was invited as a visiting professor to the University of Strasbourg (1950-1951), University of Rennes (1951), Hebrew University of Jerusalem (1953-1954), University of Marseilles, Nice, (1958), University of California at Berkeley, Western Reserve University (now Case Western Reserve University) and Columbia University. He lectured in Italy, Japan, and India, and served as the Harold Vyvyan Harmsworth Visiting Professor of American History at Oxford University in 1960–1961. He returned to Chapel Hill in 1967 as the William Rand Kenan Professor of History. He wrote Another Look at the Twentieth-Century South (1973).

=== Author ===
Mowry published five books, co-authored six others and edited three books. He published 10 book chapters, over 50 encyclopedia articles and wrote over 100 book reviews in magazines and professional journals such as American Historical Review, Journal of American History, American Political Science Review, Mississippi Valley Historical Review, Journal of Southern History, New York Times, and Saturday Review of Literature. Three of his books were awarded the Silver Literary Medal by the Commonwealth Club of California in 1946, 1956, 1959. His several university textbooks (especially those coauthored with Hicks) went through numerous editions.

=== Debate on Progressive leadership ===
According to historian Michael H. Ebner, "Mowry-Hofstadter-Chandler (Richard Hofstadter, Alfred D. Chandler Jr.) amounted to an inseparable intellectual trio for those studying the Progressive Era in American History." These three pioneers shaped the debate by emphasizing the middle-class nature of Progressivism in the early 20th century and declared that it was a cohesive movement. Their findings were partially challenged by Gabriel Kolko, Samuel Hays, Robert Wiebe, James Weinstein, and J. Joseph Huthmacher, who all questioned the middle-class background of these reformers. Meanwhile, Peter Filene opened the debate on whether progressivism was indeed a cohesive movement. Others have focused on individuals or on individual reforms to add depth to the pioneering work started by Hofstadter and Mowry. Mowry encouraged historians to enrich and expand his profile of Progressive reforms especially quantitative historians who could compile and analyze data on the common citizen. That there was a viable Progressive profile is commonly accepted.

Mowry was the first historian to use President Theodore Roosevelt's papers after 1909 and published a revised form of his dissertation entitled Theodore Roosevelt and the Progressive Movement which highlighted the critical role populism played as the "real seedbed" of progressivism. His next work, The California Progressives, (1963) what Mowry considered his most "ablest work" was a group study of literate, middle class progressives. Mowry continued his interest in urban history and in 1967 published The Urban Nation 1920-1960, which was later updated and expanded with Blaine A. Brownell (1981).

=== Professional leadership roles ===
Mowry was elected as president of the Organization of American Historians (1965–66), and for years was the chairman of its executive committee. He also served as chairman of the Atomic Energy Commission's Historical Advisory Committee from 1967 to 1969. He was a member of the editorial board of the Mississippi Valley Historical Review (1949–52) and a fellow of the Society of American Historians. Historian Thomas D. Clark characterized Mowry as a man of "absolute integrity" and added "keen intellect, broad academic interests, insight, and balanced judgment - all essential to the historian and teacher."

== Bibliography ==
- American Society in a Changing World with C.H. Pegg (1942)
- Theodore Roosevelt and the Progressive Movement (1946, 1960) online
- The California Progressives (1951, 1963) read online
- A Short History of American Democracy, (6 editions, with John D. Hicks, 1956+)
- The Era of Theodore Roosevelt, 1900-1912 (New York: Harper & Brothers, 1958, 1962) read online
- The American Nation, 5 editions with John D. Hicks and Robert E. Burke (1963) online
- The Federal Union, 5 editions with John D. Hicks and Robert E. Burke (1964)
- The Urban Nation, 1920-1960 (1967)
- A History of American Democracy with John D. Hicks and Robert E. Burke (1970)
- Another Look at the Twentieth -Century South (1973)
- The Urban Nation, 1920-1980 with Blaine A. Brownell (1981) online
- Edited. The American Tradition, The Unpublished Papers of John D. Hicks (1955)
- Edited. The Treason of the Senate with Judson Grenier (1964)
- Edited. The Twenties: Fords, Flappers and Fanatics (1963) read online
