= J. Revell Carr =

American historian

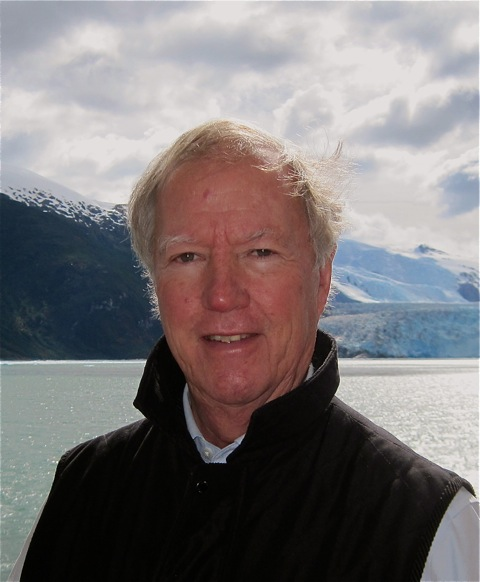
Author Revell Carr

J. Revell Carr (born 1939) is an American author, historian, curator and museum director.

== Biography ==
Carr was born in Bryn Mawr, Pennsylvania. He had a long career at Mystic Seaport. He held leadership positions in a number of other museum and cultural organizations. He has written two non-fiction books. In 2000, Carr was designated The Nathaniel Bowditch Maritime Scholar of the Year, by the United States Merchant Marine Academy.

== Career ==
Carr holds a BA from Rutgers University and an MA degree from the University of Pennsylvania as well as a diploma in Strategic Non-profit Management from the Harvard Business School. Carr graduated from U.S. Naval Officer Candidate School in Newport, RI and served for two years in USS De Haven (DD-727) home-ported in Yokosuka, Japan. After serving on the faculty of Officer Candidate School, he completed active duty in 1967 with the rank of Lieutenant.

He worked at Mystic Seaport for over 30 years, serving as Chief Curator and as Director and President for 23 years, retiring in 2000. During this time, he held advisory positions with the International Congress of Maritime Museums, the Council of American Maritime Museums, the Advisory Council to the International Council of Museums (ICOM), UNESCO, the American Association of Museums, the National Trust for Historic Preservation, the National Maritime Heritage Task Force, and served as a member of the U.S. Secretary of the Navy's Advisory Committee on Naval History. Additionally, Carr advised the governments of Great Britain and France on the preservation of maritime history, and consulted with maritime preservation efforts and museums in numerous other countries.

Carr collated Amerikanische Schiffsbilder, the catalogue for an American Bicentennial Exhibition, which he curated in Hamburg, Germany, in 1976. Carr's first book, All Brave Sailors – The Sinking of the Anglo-Saxon, was published in 2003. Walter Cronkite, in commenting on All Brave Sailors, said, “Revell Carr in one of the world’s outstanding maritime historians. It turns out he writes like a prize-winning novelist.” The book received a Starred Review in “Publishers Weekly”, was the subject of a documentary on the German television program Aspekte, was a selection for the U.S. Navy Reading List, and was also included in the list of “101 Crackerjack Sea Books” compiled by Bookmarks magazine. In 2008, Carr published Seeds of Discontent – Deep Roots of the American Revolution, focusing the roots of the American Revolutionary War going back to the founding of the United States.

Carr served as the Historical Advisor for the A&E Network's 1958 The Doomed Voyage of the St. Louis, has appeared in documentaries in the Sea Tales Series and made a number of television appearances for Operation Sail.

In 2013, Carr helped found the Women's International Study Center (WISC) in Santa Fe and he serves as the President of the WISC Board. He is also President of the Board of Santa Fe Pro Musica, the chamber orchestra and ensembles. He is a regular lecturer for Road Scholar and Holland America Lines.

== Bibliography ==
- Amerikanische Schiffsbilder (Altonaer Museum, Hamburg, Germany, 1976)
- All Brave Sailors – The Sinking of the Anglo-Saxon (Simon & Schuster, 2004)
- Seeds of Discontent – Deep Roots of the American Revolution (Walker/Bloomsbury, 2008)
