= Atomic Energy Commission's Historical Advisory Committee =

The Atomic Energy Commission's Historical Advisory Committee was established in February 1958, when the United States Atomic Energy Commission was a decade old and continued until 1974 when the Energy Research and Development Administration (ERDA) and later the United States Department of Energy replaced the commission.

== History ==
In 1957, the United States Atomic Energy Commission appointed Dr Richard G. Hewlett to be the historian of the Atomic Energy Commission. Upon taking up this post, Hewlett proposed the creation of an historical advisory committee for the AEC. His proposal was referred to historians James Phinney Baxter III and Samuel Eliot Morison and Nobel Prize–winning physicist Isidor I. Rabi. These three men recommended the approval of Hewlett's proposal as a means of giving credibility of the AEC Historical Office's work and avoiding self-serving official history.

== Chairman ==
The following is a chronological list of chairmen, 1958–1974. In cases where a chairman also served as a regular member of the committee, his dates of such service are listed in the alphabetical listing of members.

- James Phinney Baxter III, 1958-1967
- George E. Mowry, 1967-1969
- Alfred D. Chandler, Jr., 1969-1974

== Members ==
The following is an alphabetical listing of members who served on this committee:

- John Morton Blum, 1958-1962
- James L. Cate, 1958-1969
- Thomas C. Cochran, 1973-1974
- A. Hunter Dupree, 1968-1973
- Constance McL. Green, 1964-1969
- Ralph W. Hiddy, 1962-1969
- Thomas P. Hughes, 1973-1974
- Richard S. Kirkendall, 1973-1974
- Richard W. Leopold, 1973-1974
- Ernest R. May, 1969-1973
- George E. Mowry, 1962-1967
- Robert P. Multhauf, 1969-1973

== Sources ==
- Richard W. Leopold, "Historians and the Federal Government: Historical Advisory Committees: State, Defense, and the Atomic Energy Commission," The Pacific Historical Review, vol. 44, No. 3. (Aug 1975), pp. 373–385.
