= The Federal Union =

1937 American history textbook

The Federal Union: A History of the United States to 1877
- First edition hardcover
- Authors: John D. Hicks; George E. Mowry; Robert E. Burke
- Original title: The Federal Union: A History of the United States to 1865
- Language: English
- Subject: History
- Published: 1937 (1st ed.); 1949 (2nd ed.); 1957 (3rd ed.); 1964 (4th ed.); 1970 (5th ed.)
- Publisher: Houghton Mifflin
- Publication place: United States
- ISBN: 978-0-395-04620-3
- OCLC: 855172180

The Federal Union: A History of the United States to 1877 (originally published as The Federal Union: A History of the United States to 1865) is history of the United States written by John Donald Hicks, George E. Mowry and Robert E. Burke. First published in 1937, it covered the period from the discovery of the Americas in 1492 to the end of the Civil War in 1865. Four revised editions followed that also covered the Reconstruction Era up to 1877, and accordingly were published with an updated subtitle. The fifth and final edition appeared in 1970.

The Federal Union was primarily written as a university-level textbook, and was published with accompanying manuals for instructors and for students. It was the first of a two-volume set. The second volume was entitled The American Nation: 1865 to the Present. An abridged one-volume edition first appeared in 1946 as A Short History of American Democracy.

The book was aimed at undergraduate students, other readers appreciated its qualities. For example, historian George Fort Milton admired Hicks's "capacity for extraordinary compression without at the same time either getting the style too bare-bones for pleasurable reading; or the facts too black-and-white for the necessary implications of gradations of gray."
