= The Search for Order =

American history textbook

The Search for Order, 1877-1920
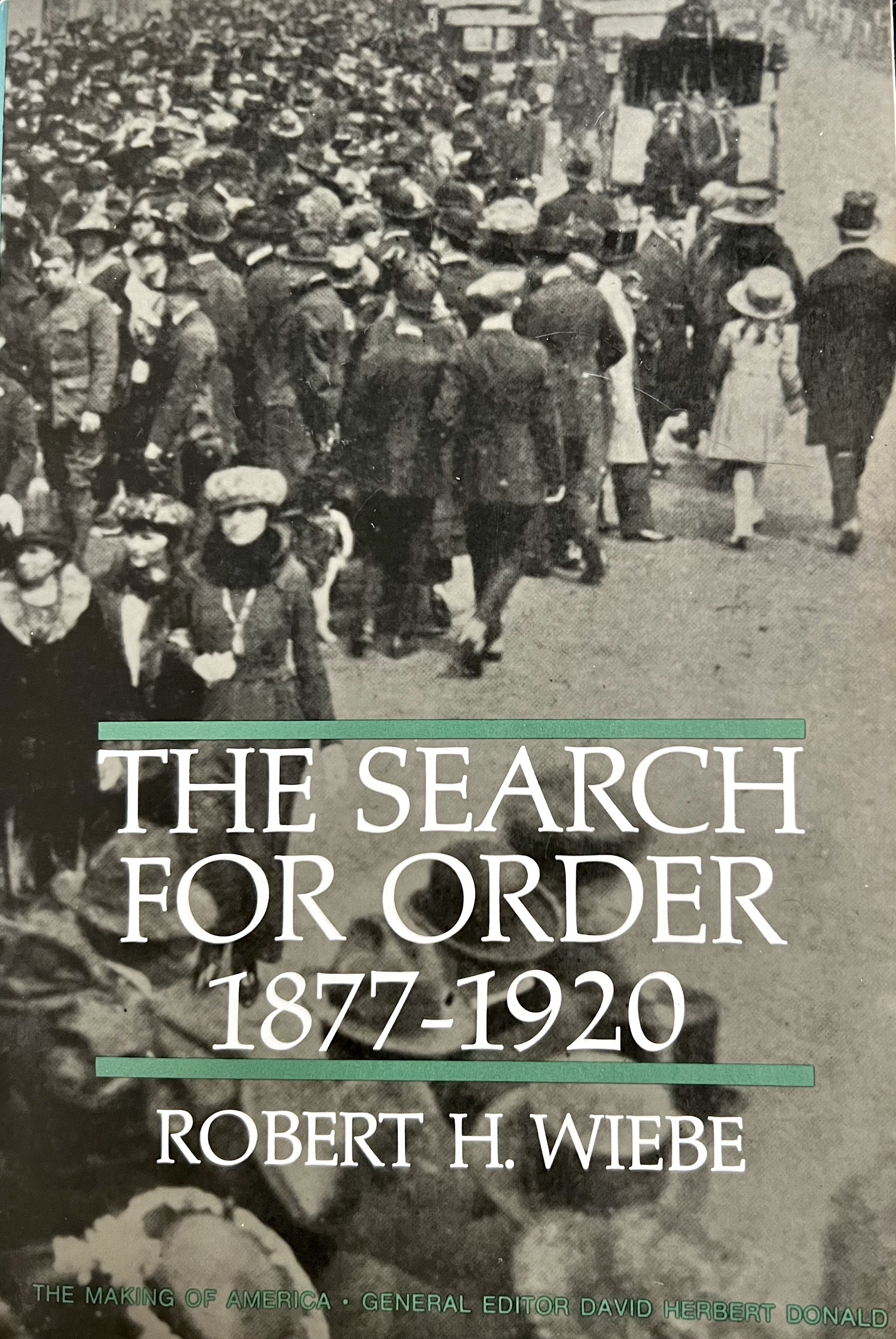
- Cover of 1995 edition
- Author: Robert H. Wiebe
- Language: English
- Subject: American history
- Genre: Non-fiction
- Publisher: Hill and Wang
- Publication date: January 1967
- Publication place: United States
- Pages: 333 pages
- ISBN: 0809001047

The Search for Order, 1877-1920 is a 1967 history textbook by American historian Robert H. Wiebe. First published in January 1967, it was included as part of The Making of America series at Harvard University, a six-volume history of the United States. Wiebe was a professor of history at Northwestern University and the author of multiple other works of American history including Businesses and Reform: A Study of the Progressive Movement. A forward was written by David Herbert Donald.

== Synopsis ==
A socioeconomic, political, and cultural analysis of the United States during the period between the end of Reconstruction and the Progressive Era, Wiebe's work describes American society and how the introduction of new scientific and technological advancements changed the ways in which citizens connected with the larger country outside of their local communities as well as how they perceived themselves in an increasingly national sense. These changes led to new ideologies that embraced utopian ideals and the belief that through impersonal, federal authority the ills society was experiencing from the rapid urban-industrialization of the Gilded Age could be tamed, quelled, or used to create a better future and society. Wiebe analyzes the appearance and life of the Populist party and its appeal to the rural parts of the country as well as the hopes for the party, which would be reproduced in the ensuing Progressive movement of the early twentieth century. The result would be a transition from "a society of island communities" held together by local autonomy to the development of "America's initial experiment in bureaucratic order," primarily driven by the emerging, new middle class that was created through the advancements.

== Reception ==
The Search for Order was well received upon its release and has greatly impacted the scholarship of the time period. A review of the book for the 1968 Summer edition of American Quarterly called it a "fresh and lively interpretation" of the era and that "scholars will be arguing about the 'Wiebe Thesis' for years to come." Historian David P. Thelen included the work in his 1968 assessment of the new interpretation of the Reconstruction era including analysis of Frederic C. Howe's 1925 The Confessions of a Reformer. The book was also reviewed by David B. Griffiths in the Fall 1968 edition of The Canadian Historical Review. In 2018, on the fiftieth anniversary of the book's appearance, Ian Tyrrell revisited the book and the impact of Wiebe's work on the academic community.
