= Orin Grant Libby =

American historian (1864–1952)

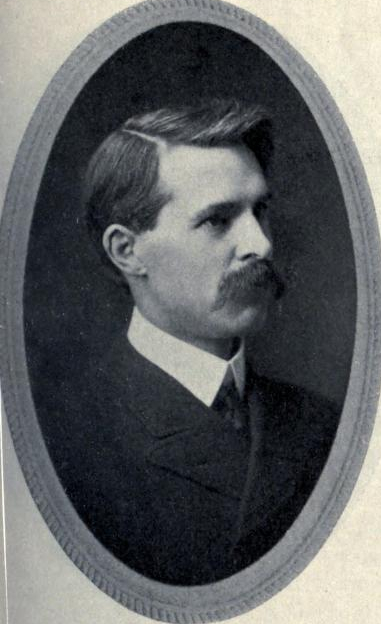
Portrait c. 1903

Orin Grant Libby (June 9, 1864, near Hammond, Wisconsin – March 29, 1952, Grand Forks, North Dakota) was an American historian.

== Biography ==
Libby was the son of farmer Asa Libby and his wife Julia (Barrows) Libby. As well as farming, his father held several local government positions, and worked in several skilled crafts. In 1886, Libby received a diploma from River Falls State Normal School, and then taught in high schools until 1890, when he entered the University of Wisconsin–Madison as a junior. He received a bachelor's degree from Wisconsin in 1892, and stayed to continue his studies in history. In 1893, he submitted a master's thesis with an emphasis on economic history entitled “De Witt Clinton and the Erie Canal — A State Enterprise.” He ultimately received a Ph.D. at Wisconsin in 1895, his dissertation being entitled The Geographical Distribution of the Vote of the Thirteen States on the Federal Constitution 1787–8. His dissertation examined the economics and geography behind the voting patterns for the Constitution. An influential advisor was Frederick Jackson Turner. Afterward, he continued at Wisconsin as an instructor, and as a historical researcher seeking to apply the methodology of physical and biological sciences to his studies of Congressional voting patterns.

Although Libby's Ph.D. dissertation made a strong positive impression on Turner, and their relationship was initially cordial, Turner began to question his former student's abilities, and their interaction became contentious. Libby was denied an assistant professorship, and finally in 1902 he was obligated to leave Wisconsin. One factor in the decision to terminate his career at Wisconsin was his devotion to ornithological research. While at Wisconsin, in 1900 he married Eva Gertrude Cory. The marriage yielded two children. He continued his interest in ornithology for the rest of his life.

He moved on to become an assistant professor at the University of North Dakota (UND). There he worked on studies of the history of North Dakota, among which were studies of the history of Native Americans. One of the latter studies, The Arikara Narrative of the Campaign against the Hostile Dakotas, June 1876 (1920), won their praise.

He helped found the Mississippi Valley Historical Association (now the Organization of American Historians), and was president of it for a year. Controversy with other UND faculty and its president, Thomas F. Kane, almost resulted in his dismissal in the 1920s, but alumni pressure kept him in his position. The history department divided into a department on American history, which Libby headed, and a department of European history. After his retirement in 1945, the two departments merged into one again. Shortly before his retirement, he resigned as secretary to the state historical society and ceased editing the North Dakota Historical Quarterly, two long-time endeavors.
