= James Willard Hurst =

American legal scholar (1910–1997)

- Born: October 6, 1910; Rockford, Illinois, U.S.
- Died: June 18, 1997 (aged 86); Madison, Wisconsin, U.S.
- Education: Williams College; Harvard University
- Scientific career
- Fields: Legal history
- Workplaces: University of Wisconsin Law School
- Academic advisors: Felix Frankfurter

James Willard Hurst (October 6, 1910 – June 18, 1997) was an American legal scholar widely credited as the founder of the modern field of American legal history. Educated at Harvard Law School, from which he graduated in 1935, Hurst was a research assistant to Professor Felix Frankfurter, and later a law clerk to Justice Louis Brandeis. Hurst spent most of his professional career as a professor of law at the University of Wisconsin Law School in Madison, Wisconsin. He was Pitt Professor of American History and Institutions at the University of Cambridge in 1967. He was elected to the American Philosophical Society in 1958 and the American Academy of Arts and Sciences in 1966.

Hurst had his greatest influence through his writings. His first major book, The Growth of American Law: The Law Makers (Little, Brown, 1950), examined the various institutions and groups that made law in America from independence through the mid-twentieth century—legislatures, the courts, the executive, the bar, and administrative agencies. His most influential work, Law and the Conditions of Freedom in the Nineteenth-Century United States (University of Wisconsin Press, 1956), was famous for his thesis that Americans used law to release the population's creative energies. The book usually deemed his masterwork is Law and Economic Growth: A Legal History of the Lumber Industry in Wisconsin, 1836-1915 (Harvard University Press, 1964; reissued with new introduction, University of Wisconsin Press, 1984).

Hurst's other books include Justice Holmes on Legal History (Macmillan, 1964), Law and Social Process in the United States (University of Michigan Press, 1960), Law and Social Order in the United States (Cornell University Press, 1977), A Legal History of Money in the United States 1774-1970 (University of Nebraska Press, 1973), The Legitimacy of the Business Corporation in the Law of the United States (University of Virginia Press, 1970), Dealing with Statutes (Columbia University Press, 1982), and Law and Markets in United States History: Different Modes of Bargaining Among Interests (University of Wisconsin Press, 1982). In 1971 he collected a series of influential law-review articles from the 1940s under the title The Law of Treason in the United States (Greenwood Press, 1971).

== See also ==
- List of law clerks for the fourth seat of the Supreme Court of the United States
