= Jacquelyn Dowd Hall =

American historian

- Born: Jacquelyn Dowd; 1943 (age 82–83); Pauls Valley, Oklahoma, U.S.
- Spouses: Bob Hall (m. 1972; div. 1980) Robert Korstad (m. 1995)

Academic background
- Education: Rhodes College (BA); Columbia University (MA, PhD)
- Doctoral advisor: Kenneth T. Jackson

Academic work
- Discipline: History
- Institutions: University of North Carolina at Chapel Hill

Jacquelyn Dowd Hall (born 1943) is an American historian and Julia Cherry Spruill Professor Emerita at the University of North Carolina at Chapel Hill. Her scholarship and teaching forwarded the emergence of U.S. women's history in the 1960s and 1970s, helped to inspire new research on Southern labor history and the long civil rights movement, and encouraged the use of oral history sources in historical research. She is the author of Revolt Against Chivalry: Jessie Daniel Ames and the Women’s Campaign Against Lynching; Like a Family: The Making of a Southern Cotton Mill World (with James Leloudis, Robert R. Korstad, Mary Murphy, Lu Ann Jones, and Christopher R. Daly;) and Sisters and Rebels: The Struggle for the Soul of America.

== Early life and education ==
Jacquelyn Dowd Hall was born in Pauls Valley, Oklahoma, in 1943, the oldest of five children. After graduating from high school as valedictorian, she attended Memphis Southwestern College (now Rhodes College), where she first became involved in the civil rights movement when she joined student protests against segregation. In 1965, she graduated from Southwestern with high honors.

In 1967, she earned a Master of Arts from Columbia University. Studying under Kenneth T. Jackson, she completed her Ph.D. at Columbia University, with distinction, in 1974. Her dissertation, which became her first book, won the Bancroft Award for the best dissertation in American history, diplomacy, or international relations.

== Career ==
Hall worked as a flight attendant for Delta Air Lines in 1965 and 1966.

In 1970, she moved from New York City to Atlanta, where she worked for the Southern Regional Council, helped to lead an oral history project at the Institute for Southern Studies, and was involved in the women's liberation movement. In 1973, she became a tenure track instructor in the history department at the University of North Carolina at Chapel Hill and founding director of UNC's Southern Oral History Program (SOHP).

In 1989, Hall was named Julia Cherry Spruill Professor of History at the University of North Carolina at Chapel Hill. During her time at UNC, she served as advisor and mentor to many graduate students, a number of whom went on to distinguished scholarly careers and to leadership positions in oral history and public history endeavors. She served as director of the Southern Oral History Program until 2011. During her tenure, the SOHP collected over 5000 interviews on the history of the American South, covering topics such as industrialization, the long civil rights movement, women's history, and Southern politics. She also served as Mark W. Clark Distinguished Visiting Professor of History at The Citadel (2015), Sherman Fairchild Distinguished Visiting Scholar at the California Institute of Technology (1995), director of the Duke University–University of North Carolina Center for Research on Women (1991–1994), and Ford Foundation Professor at the Center for the Study of Southern Culture at the University of Mississippi (1987).

Over the course of her career, Hall has been elected president of the Organization of American Historians and the Southern Historical Association and founding president of the Labor and Working Class History Association. She was elected to the Society of American Historians in 1990 and the American Academy of Arts and Sciences in 2011.

She retired in 2014 and resides in Chapel Hill, North Carolina.

== Personal life ==
From 1970 to 1982, she was married to Bob Hall, who went on to be an organizer, investigative reporter, and long-time head of the Institute for Southern Studies and executive director of Democracy NC. In May 2013, Hall and her husband Robert Korstad, a professor of history and public policy at Duke University, whom she married in 1995, were among the second group of protestors to be arrested in North Carolina's Moral Monday protests against measures taken by then-Governor Pat McCrory and the Republican-controlled North Carolina General Assembly. They were also among the founders of Scholars for North Carolina's Future.

== Fellowships ==
Hall has held fellowships from the Guggenheim Foundation, the Center for Advanced Study in the Behavioral Sciences, the Radcliffe Center for Advanced Study, the Wilson Center, and the National Humanities Center.

== Awards ==
- 2015:
  - Award for Distinguished Service to Labor and Working-Class History, Labor and Working-Class History Association
  - Stephen E. Ambrose Oral History Award, Rutgers University Living History Society
- 2013: Mary Turner Lane Award for outstanding contributions to the lives of women at UNC-Chapel Hill, Association of Women Faculty and Professionals
- 2011: Fellow, American Academy of Arts and Sciences
- 2011: Cornelia Phillips Spencer Award, Chapel Hill Historical Society for extraordinary achievement by a woman who has lived in Chapel Hill
- 2000–2001: Distinguished Alumni Award, Rhodes College
- 1999: National Humanities Medal
- 1997: Distinguished Teaching Award for Post-Baccalaureate Instruction, UNC
- 1997-2002: Executive Board, Society of American Historians
- 1990: Elected Fellow, Society of American Historians (for “literary distinction in the writing of history and biography”);

== Legacy ==
- Jacquelyn Dowd Hall Prize, Southern Association of Women Historians (two best graduate papers presented at triennial Southern Conference on Women's History), 1994–present
- Jacquelyn Hall Summer Research Fellowship, Southern Oral History Program, UNC, endowed 2017, awarded annually

== Works ==
Books:

- Sisters and Rebels: A Struggle for the Soul of America (2019)
- Revolt Against Chivalry: Jessie Daniel Ames and the Women’s Campaign Against Lynching (1979)

Collaborative Books:

- Like a Family: The Making of a Southern Cotton Mill World (1987)

Edited Works:

- Katharine Du Pre Lumpkin, Eli Hill: A Novel of Reconstruction (Athens: University of Georgia Press, 2020). Coedited and introduced with Bruce Baker.

Selected Articles in Scholarly Journals:

- “The Long Civil Rights Movement and the Political Uses of the Past,” Journal of American History 91 (March 2005): 1233–263. Reprinted in Best Articles in American History, 2007, ed. Jacqueline Jones (New York, 2007).
- “Women Writers, the ‘Southern Front,’ and the Dialectical Imagination,” Journal of Southern History 69 (Feb. 2003): 3-38.
- “Last Words,” contribution to Round Table on Self and Subject, Journal of American History 89 (June 2002): 30–36.
- “‘To Widen the Reach of Our Love’: Autobiography, History, and Desire,” Feminist Studies 26 (Spring 2000): 231–47.
- “‘You Must Remember This’: Autobiography as Social Critique,” Journal of American History 85 (September 1998): 439–65. Reprinted in The New South: New Histories, ed. J. William Harris, (London, 2007).
- “Open Secrets: Memory, Imagination, and the Refashioning of Southern Identity,” American Quarterly 50 (March 1998): 110–24. Reprinted in Unequal Sisters: A Multicultural Reader, ed. Ellen Dubois and Vicki Ruiz (New York, 2000, 2007, 2008).
- “A Later Comment”; contribution to “What We See and Can’t See in the Past: A Round Table,” Journal of American History 83 (March 1997): 1268–70.
- “Broadus Mitchell,” Radical History Review 45 (Fall 1989): 31–38. Reprinted as “Broadus Mitchell: Economic Historian of the South,” Reading Southern History: Essays on Interpreters and Interpretations, ed. Glenn Feldman (Tuscaloosa, 2001), 25–31.
- “Partial Truths,” Signs: Journal of Women in Culture and Society 14 (Summer 1989): 900–911.
- “Cotton Mill People: Work, Community and Protest in the Textile South, 1880–1940,” American Historical Review 91 (April 1986): 245–86. Coauthors Robert Korstad and James Leloudis. Reprinted in Major Problems in the History of the American South, ed. Paul D. Escott and David R. Goldfield (Lexington, Mass., 1990); Major Problems in the Gilded Age and the Progressive Era, ed. Leon Fink (Lexington, Mass., 1992; Taking Sides: Clashing Views on Controversial Issues in American History, Vol. II, ed. Larry Madaras and James M. SoRelle (Guilford, Conn., 2001).
- “Disorderly Women: Gender and Labor Militancy in the Appalachian South,” Journal of American History 73 (September 1986): 354–82. Reprinted in Women’s America: Refocusing the Past, ed. Linda K. Kerber and Jane DeHart Mathews (1982, 1987, 1991, 1995, 2000, 2009, 2011, 2015); Unequal Sisters: A Multicultural Reader, ed. Ellen Dubois and Vicki Ruiz (1990, 1994); Gender in American History from 1890, ed. Barbara Melosh (1993); Half Sisters of History: Southern Women and the American Past, ed. Catherine Clinton (1994); Major Problems in American Women’s History, ed. Mary Beth Norton and Ruth M. Alexander (1996).
- “Second Thoughts: On Writing a Feminist Biography,” Feminist Studies 13 (Spring 1987): 19–37.
- Preface, “Women’s History Goes to Trial: EEOC v. Sears Roebuck and Company,” Signs: Journal of Women in Culture and Society 11 (Summer 1986): 751–53.

Book Chapters:

- "How We Tell About the Civil Rights Movement and Why It Matters," NASA in the Long Civil Movement, ed. Brian C. Odom and Stephan P. Waring (Gainesville: University Press of Florida, 2019), ix-xiv.
- "The Good Fight," Mothers and Strangers: Essays on Motherhood from the New South, ed. Samia Serageldin and Lee Smith (Chapel Hill: UNC Press, 2019), 120–26.
- Die Lange Bürgerrechtsbewegung und die politisch Instrumentalisierung von Geschichte," Von Selma Bis Ferguson: Rasse un Rassismus in den USA, ed. Michael Butter, Astrid Fanke, and Hor st Tonn (Bielefeld, 2016), 15-46.
- “Case Study: The Southern Oral History Program,” The Oxford Handbook of Oral History, ed. Donald A. Ritchie (New York, 2010), 409–16. Coauthor Kathryn Nasstrom.
- “Reflections,” Jumpin’ Jim Crow: Race and Politics in the New South, ed. Jane Dailey, Glenda Gilmore, and Bryant Simon (Princeton, 2000), 34–07.
- “Afterward: Reverberations,” Remembering: Oral History Performance, ed. Della Pollock (New York, 2005), 187–98.
- “O. Delight Smith: A Labor Organizer’s Odyssey,” in Forgotten Heroes from America’s Past: Inspiring Portraits from Our Leading Historians, ed. Susan Ware (New York, 1998), 185–93.
- “O. Delight Smith’s Progressive Era: Labor, Feminism and Reform in the Urban South,” in Visible Women: New Essays on American Activism, ed. Nancy Hewitt and Suzanne Lebsock (Urbana, 1993), 166–98.
- “Partial Truths,” in Southern Women: Histories and Identities, ed. Virginia Bernhard et al. (Columbia, MO, 1992).
- “Lives through Time: Second Thoughts on Jessie Daniel Ames,” The Challenge of Feminist Biography: Writing the Lives of Modern American Women, ed. Sara Alpern et al. (Urbana, 1992).
- “Private Eyes, Public Women: Class and Sex in the Urban South, Atlanta, 1913–1915,” in Work Engendered: Toward a New History of American Labor, ed. Ava Baron (Ithaca, 1991), 243–72. Reprinted in Looking for America: The Visual Production of Nation and People, ed. Ardis Cameron (Malden, MA, 2005).
- “History, Story, and Performance: The Making and Remaking of a Southern Cotton Mill World,” in Reconstructing American Literary and Historical Studies, ed. Günter H. Lenz, Hartmut Keil, and Sabine Bröck-Sallah (New York, 1990), 324–44. Coauthor Della Pollock.
- "A Bond of Common Womanhood: Building an Interracial Community in the Jim Crow South," in Women, Families, and Communities: Readings in American History, ed. Nancy A. Hewitt (Glenview, Ill, 1990), 99–114.
- “Women in the South,” in Interpreting Southern History: Historiographical Essays in Honor of Sanford W. Higginbotham, ed. John B. Boles and Evelyn T. Nolen (Baton Rouge, 1987), 454–509. Coauthor Anne Firor Scott.
- “‘The Mind That Burns in Each Body’: Women, Rape, and Racial Violence,” in Powers of Desire: The Politics of Sexuality, ed. Ann Snitow et al (New York, 1983), 328–49. Reprinted in Race, Class, and Gender: An Anthology, ed. Margaret L. Andersen and Patricia Hill Collins (Belmont, Calif., 1992); Southern Exposure, 12 (November/December 1984).
- “‘A Truly Subversive Affair’: Women Against Lynching in the Twentieth-Century South,” in Women of America: A History, ed. Carol Berkin and Mary Beth Norton (Boston, 1979), 360–88.

Publication Awards

- Sisters and Rebels: A Struggle for the Soul of America:
  - PEN/Jacqueline Bograd Weld Award for Biography, PEN America (distinguished biography of exceptional literary, narrative, and artistic merit, based on scrupulous research)
  - Summersell Prize, Frances S. Summersell Center for the Study of the South at the University of Alabama (best book on the history of the American South)
  - Prose Award, the Association of American Publishers (outstanding work by a trade publisher)
  - Sydnor Award, Southern Historical Association (co-winner, best book on southern history)
  - Julia Cherry Spruill Prize, Southern Association of Women Historians (co-winner, best book in southern women’s history)
  - Willie Lee Rose Prize, Southern Association of Women Historians (co-winner, best book on any topic in southern history written by a woman)
  - Bell Award, Georgia Historical Society (best book on Georgia history); Plutarch Award Finalist, Biographers International (best biography of 2019)
- The Long Civil Rights Movement and the Political Uses of the Past: Best Articles in American History, 2007 (New York: Palgrave Macmillan, 2007), ed. Jacqueline Jones for the Organization of American Historian (chosen by a panel of eight historians from 300 scholarly and popular journals)
- ‘You Must Remember This,’': A. Elizabeth Taylor Prize, Southern Association of Women Historians (best article in the field of southern women's history)
- Like a Family:
  - Albert J. Beveridge Award, American Historical Association (best work in English on the history of the Americas)
  - Merle Curti Social History Award, Organization of American Historians, co-winner (best book in social history)
  - Philip Taft Labor History Prize, Cornell University, School of Industrial and Labor Relations (outstanding contribution to American labor history)
  - John Hope Franklin Prize, Honorable Mention, American Studies Association (exemplary interdisciplinary scholarship)
- “Disorderly Women”:
  - Annual Article Prize, Berkshire Conference of Women Historians (best article on any historical subject written by an American woman)
  - Binkley-Stephenson Award, Organization of American Historians (best scholarly article published in the Journal of American History)
- Revolt Against Chivalry:
  - Francis B. Simkins Award, Southern Historical Association (best first book in Southern history)
  - Lillian Smith Award, Southern Regional Council (for writing that carries on Smith's legacy of elucidating the condition of racial and social inequity and proposing a vision of justice and human understanding)
  - Bancroft Dissertation Award, Columbia University, 1974 best dissertation in history, diplomacy, or diplomatic affairs)
