= James Carafano =

US army officer and military writer

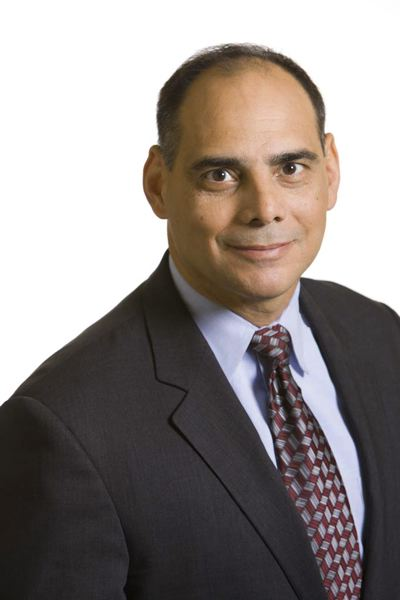
- Carafano in 2011
- Born: James Jay Carafano; May 8, 1955 (age 71); New York City, New York, U.S.
- Occupations: Vice President, Kathryn and Shelby Cullom Davis Institute for National Security and Foreign Policy, The Heritage Foundation; Adjunct professor, Institute of World Politics

James Jay Carafano (born May 8, 1955) is the director of the Douglas and Sarah Allison Center for Foreign Policy Studies and vice president of the Kathryn and Shelby Cullom Davis Institute for International Studies at The Heritage Foundation. Carafano is also an adjunct professor at the Institute of World Politics.

== Early life and education ==
Carafano was born in New York City, and raised in East Meadow, New York. He graduated from the United States Military Academy, West Point, NY in 1977. He holds an M.A. in British and early modern European history from Georgetown University, an M.A. in strategic studies from the U.S. War College in Carlisle, Pennsylvania, and a Ph.D. in diplomatic history from Georgetown.

== Career ==
=== Military and academic ===
Carafano served 25 years in the Army in Europe, South Korea, and the U.S., and he rose to the rank of lieutenant colonel. During that time, he served as head speech writer for the Army Chief of Staff and was the executive director of Joint Force Quarterly, the Defense Department's military journal.

Carafano has taught at Mount Saint Mary College in New York and served as a fleet professor at the U.S. Naval War College. He has been an assistant professor at the U.S. Military Academy at West Point, and, as of 2011, he serves as a visiting professor at the National Defense University at Fort Lesley McNair in Washington and at Georgetown. Carafano joined The Institute of World Politics in Washington, D.C., in 2013 as an adjunct professor. He is a member of the National Academies Board on Army Science and Technology, the Department of the Army Historical Advisory Committee, and is a senior fellow at the George Washington University Homeland Security Policy Institute. Carafano is an advisory board member of Spirit of America, a 501(c)(3) organization that supports the safety and success of Americans serving abroad and the local people and partners they seek to help.

=== The Heritage Foundation ===
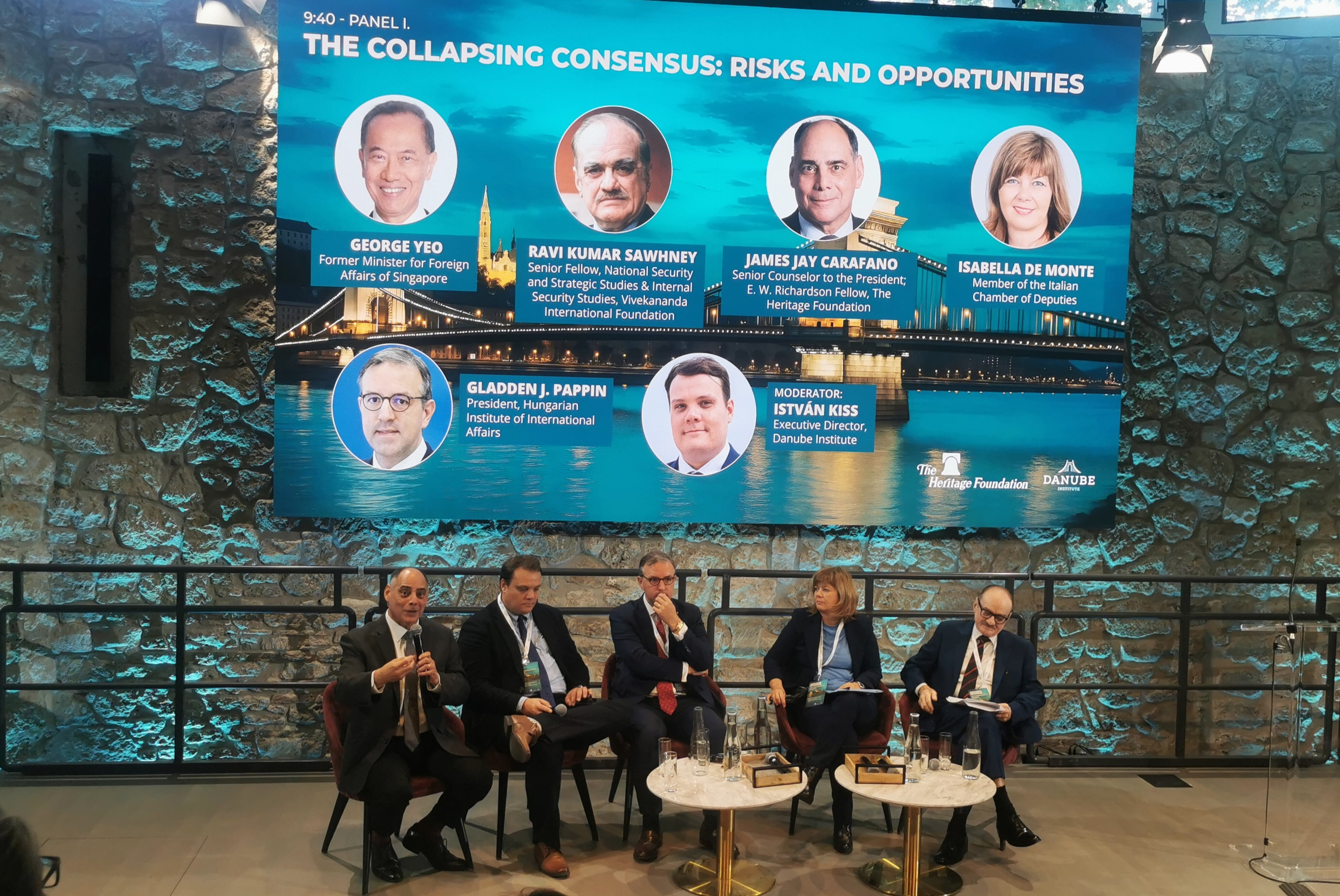
Panel at Geopolitical Summit Budapest 2025

Carafano co-authored the homeland security report, Homeland Security 3.0: Building a National Enterprise to Keep America Safe, Free, and Prosperous. He also co-wrote A New Strategy For Real Immigration Reform. Writing regarding defense, Carafano's 2008 study Providing for the Common Defense: What 10 Years of Progress Would Look Like, maps out a 10-year defense-strategy blueprint, including setting a floor on the defense budget as four percent of GDP.

Carafano is the head of Heritage's antisemitism operations including Project Esther. When asked by Jewish Insider to explain why the effort did not include right-wing antisemitism, Carafano said "white supremacists are not my problem because white supremacists are not part of being conservative".

=== Congress and media appearances ===
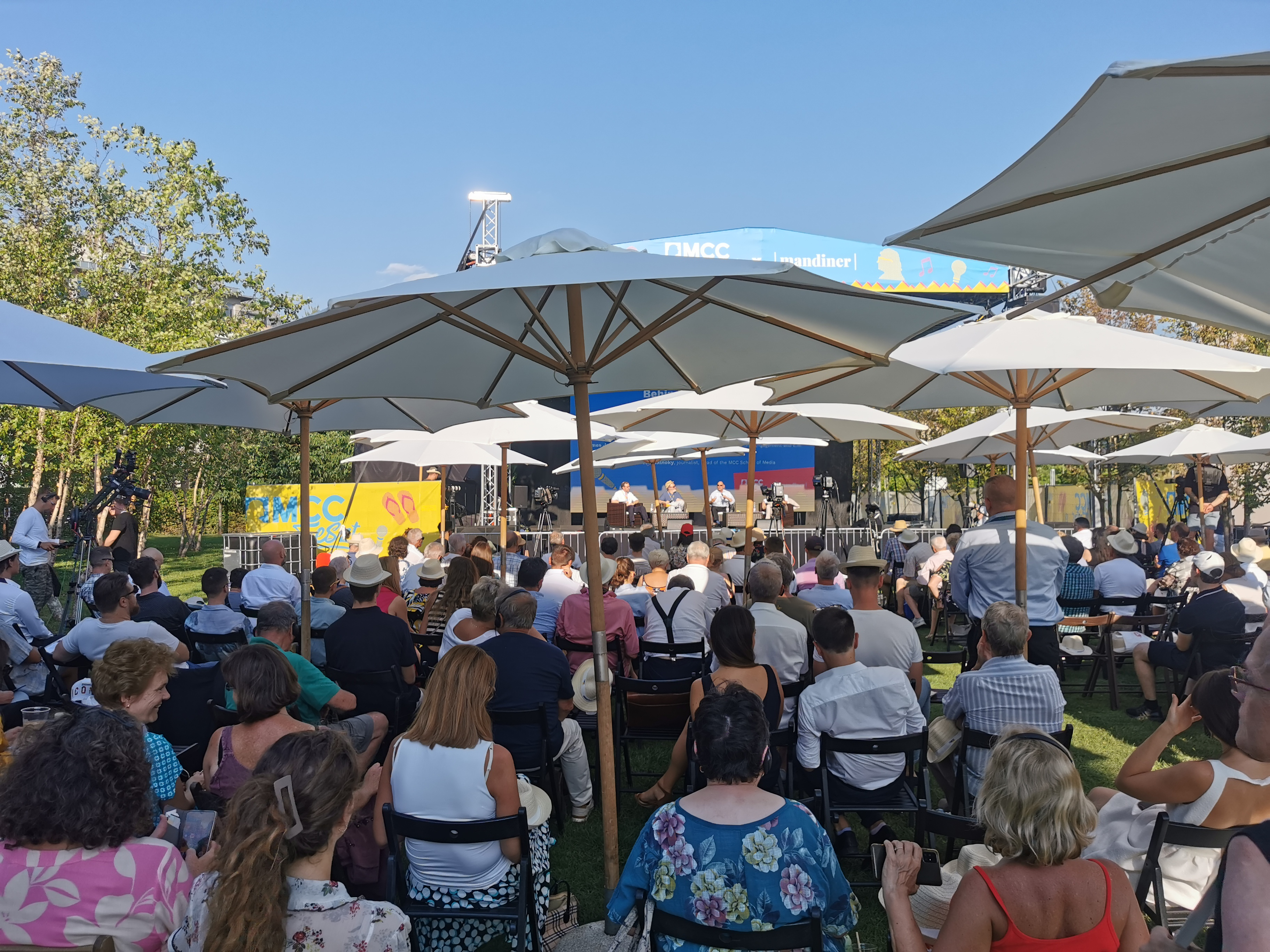
Behind the Scenes of Cultural War - panel with Gladden Pappin, Rod Dreher, Boris Kálnoky

Carafano has testified before the U.S. Congress as an expert of defense, intelligence, and homeland security issues. He provided commentary for Fox News.

In 2013, Carafano co-produced a short documentary, Veteran Nation, about the experiences of veterans of the United States Armed Forces. The film was created in partnership with ColdWater Media and Esprit de Corps and screened at The Heritage Foundation in February 2013.

Carafano is a contributing editor to the online national security publication 1945.

=== Trump transition team ===
Politico reported in 2016 that Carafano was the primary aide to the U.S. State Department for the Trump administration's transition team. He organized meetings with European and Canadian diplomatic representatives "to hear out concerns about the incoming administration. Carafano insisted he was not hosting the event on behalf of the president-elect. But diplomats and congressional staffers said they understand he is likely to emerge as the Trump team's liaison for State Department matters."

== Bibliography ==
- After D-Day (2000)
- Waltzing in to the Cold War (2002)
- Independent Task Force Report, Emergency Responders: Drastically Underfunded, Dangerously Unprepared (2003)
- Homeland Security (2005)
- Winning the Long War: Lessons from the Cold War for Defeating Terrorism and Preserving Freedom (2005)
- GI Ingenuity: Improvisation, Technology and Winning World War II (2006)
- Mismanaging Mayhem: How Washington Responds to Crisis (2008)
- Private Sector, Public Wars: Contractors in Combat—Afghanistan, Iraq, and Future Conflicts (2008)
- Wiki at War: Conflict in a Socially Networked World (Texas A&M University Press, 2012)

== See also ==
- Project Esther
