= Francis A. Sampson =

American lawyer and historian

Francis Asbury Sampson (February 6, 1842 – February 4, 1918) was an American lawyer and historian.

== Life ==
Sampson was born in 1842 in Harrison County, Ohio to Francis Sampson and Margaret Evans. He received an A.B. in 1865 and an A.M in 1868 at the City College of New York. He received an LL.B. in 1868 from the Law School of the University of the City of New York. After receiving his law degree he settled in Sedalia, Missouri, where he established a law practice and became involved in local civic and business affairs.

== Legacy ==
In 1901, Sampson was appointed secretary of the State Historical Society of Missouri, donating at the same time his sizable personal library. He was active in the development of the Society, co-founding the Mississippi Valley Historical Association and serving as its first president.

== Death ==
He died in 1918 in Columbia, Missouri.
