= Richard W. Leopold =

American historian

Richard William Leopold (6 January 1912 in New York City – 23 November 2006 in Evanston, Illinois) was a prominent diplomatic and military historian at Northwestern University.

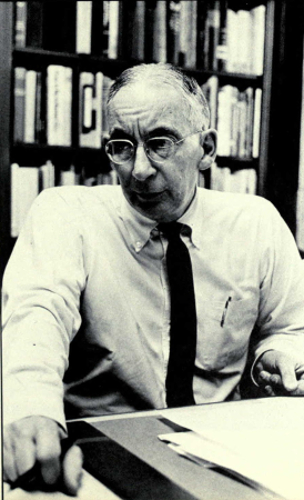
Richard W. Leopold at Northwestern University, 1975

== Early life and education ==
The second son of Harry Leopold, Sr., and Ethel Kimmelstiel, Richard Leopold grew up on the upper west side of Manhattan. He attended the Franklin School before attending Phillips Exeter Academy in 1926, where he graduated cum laude in 1929. He then attended Princeton University, graduating Phi Beta Kappa with highest honors in 1933.

After Princeton, he studied at Harvard under Arthur M. Schlesinger, Sr., receiving his master's degree in 1934 and a Ph.D. in 1938. The book based on his dissertation, Robert Dale Owen (Harvard University Press, 1940), a study of the Indiana congressman and utopian socialist, won the John H. Dunning Prize of the American Historical Association.

During World War II, he was commissioned as a naval officer and assigned to the Office of Naval Records and Library in Washington, where he devised system to organize the reports and materials relating to the ongoing naval operations.

== Academic career ==
After his release from active service in the United States Navy, he returned to Harvard University for two years and then joined the history faculty of Northwestern University in 1948, where he spent the remainder of his career. In 1963, he was appointed William Smith Mason Professor of History at Northwestern and served in that position until he retired 31 August 1980.

Among the prominent students whom Leopold influenced in their careers were Sen. George McGovern (D-S.D.), former Rep. Richard Gephardt (D-Mo.), Rep. James Kolbe (R-Ariz.), former assistant secretary of state Phyllis E. Oakley, historian John Morton Blum, journalist Georgie Anne Geyer, and television and motion picture director Garry Marshall.

Leopold served on numerous governmental advisory committees, including the Secretary of the Navy's Advisory Committee on Naval History, The Department of State Historical Advisory Committee, The Department of the Army Historical Advisory Committee, Atomic Energy Commission's Historical Advisory Committee, CIA Historical Review Panel and Library of Congress. He was a member of the Editorial Advisory Committee for the Papers of Woodrow Wilson and of the board of directors for the Harry S. Truman Library Institute. He was president of the Society for Historians of American Foreign Relations in 1970 and of the Organization of American Historians in 1976.

In 1984, the Organization of American Historians established the Richard W. Leopold Prize, which is awarded biannually. In 1990, former students of Professor Leopold's established the annual Richard W. Leopold Lectureship at Northwestern in his honor. In 1997, Northwestern University endowed the Richard W. Leopold Professorship in American history.

== Published works ==
- Robert Dale Owen: A Biography (1940; 1969)
- Elihu Root and the Conservative Tradition (New York: Little, Brown, 1954)
- Problems in American History, edited with Arthur S. Link, Stanley Coben, et al.(Englewood Cliffs: Prentice-Hall, 1952, 1957, 1966, 1972).
- The Growth of American Foreign Policy: A History, (New York: Alfred A. Knopf, 1962, 1968).
- Joint AHA-OAH Ad Hoc Committee to Investigate the Charges Against the Franklin D. Roosevelt Library and Related Matters. (Washington: American Historical Association, 1970).
