= Edward C. Kirkland =

American historian

- Born: May 24, 1894
- Died: May 24, 1975 (aged 81); Hanover, New Hampshire, U.S.
- Education: Dartmouth College; University of Cambridge; Harvard University
- Occupation: Historian
- Employer: Bowdoin College
- Spouse: Ruth S. Kirkland
- Children: 1 son

Edward Chase Kirkland (May 24, 1894 – May 24, 1975) was an American historian. He was a professor of Economics History at Bowdoin College, and the president of the Organization of American Historians and the American Association of University Professors.

== Early life ==
Kirkland was born in 1894. He was awarded the Croix de Guerre for his service in World War I.

Kirkland graduated from Dartmouth College, where he earned a bachelor's degree, and he earned a master's degree from the University of Cambridge, followed by a PhD from Harvard University.

== Career ==
Kirkland taught history at Dartmouth College, the Massachusetts Institute of Technology (MIT) and Brown University. He was a professor of economics history at Bowdoin College from 1930 to 1959.

Kirkland was the author of several books. He received a Guggenheim Fellowship in 1955. He served as the president of the Organization of American Historians and the American Association of University Professors.

== Personal life and death ==
Kirkland had a wife, Ruth, and a son, Edward. He resided in Thetford, Vermont.

Kirkland died on May 24, 1975, in Hanover, New Hampshire.

== Works (partial list) ==
- The Peacemakers of 1864 (1927)
- A History of American Economic Life(1939)
- Industry Comes of Age (1961)
- Man, Cities, and Transportation(1948 in two vols.)
