= James A. Field Jr. =

American naval historian

James Alfred Field Jr. (March 9, 1916 – June 24, 1996) was an American historian. He taught at Swarthmore College from 1947 to 1986, where he was the Isaac H. Clothier Professor of History and International Relations. He specialized in American naval history and US foreign relations. He served in the US Navy from 1942 to 1946, and saw combat in the Pacific theater. He received his BA, MA, and PhD degrees from Harvard University.

== Bibliography ==
- The Japanese at Leyte Gulf: The Shō Operation. Princeton University Press. 1947. OCLC 1261836.
- History of United States Naval Operations: Korea. U.S. Govt. Printing Office. 1962. OCLC 1131205 – via Naval History and Heritage Command.
- From Gibraltar to the Middle East: America and the Mediterranean World, 1776-1882. Chicago: Imprint Publications. 1991 [First published 1969]. ISBN 978-1-8791-7605-8.
