= Organization of American Historians =

American society of historians and professors of history

Organization of American Historians (OAH)
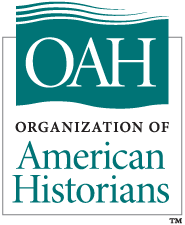
- Formation: 1907; 119 years ago
- Type: academic-oriented association
- Headquarters: Bloomington, Indiana, U.S.
- Affiliations: American Council of Learned Societies (ACLS)
- Website: www.oah.org//

The Organization of American Historians (OAH), formerly known as the Mississippi Valley Historical Association, is the largest professional society dedicated to the teaching and study of American history. OAH's members in the U.S. and abroad include college and university professors; historians, students; precollegiate teachers; archivists, museum curators, and other public historians; and a variety of scholars employed in government and the private sector. The OAH publishes the Journal of American History. Among its various programs, OAH conducts an annual conference each spring, and has a robust speaker bureau—the OAH Distinguished Lectureship Program.

The organization's mission is to promote excellence in the scholarship, teaching, and presentation of American history, and encourage wide discussion of historical questions and equitable treatment of all practitioners of history. Membership is open to all who wish to support its mission.

In 2010, its individual membership was approximately 8,000 and its institutional membership approximately 1,250. For its 2009 fiscal year ending June 30, 2009, the organization's operating budget was approximately $2.9 million. In its 2018 annual report, membership in the organization "stabilized" with approximately 7,000 members. In fiscal year 2019 (ending June 30, 2019), the organization's budget was $3.66 million.

== History ==
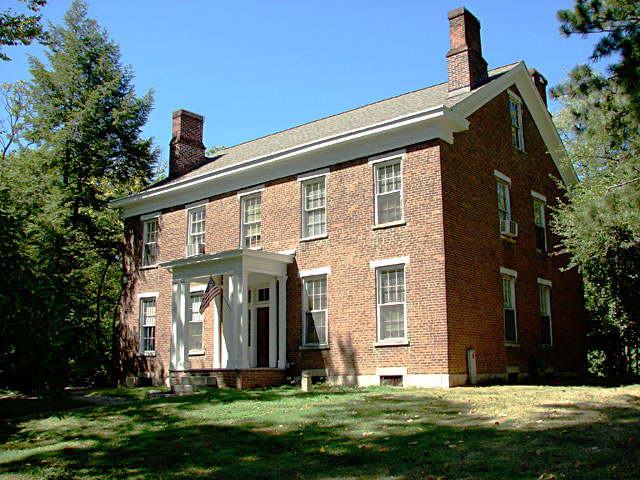
OAH headquarters in Bloomington, known as the Millen House, or the Raintree House.

OAH formed as the Mississippi Valley Historical Association at a meeting in Lincoln, Nebraska, of seven historical societies of the Mississippi Valley on October 17 and 18, 1907. The attendees assembled in response to a letter circulated by Clarence S. Paine of the Nebraska State Historical Society. The organization, devoted to studying the Mississippi Valley region, began a tradition of holding an annual meeting each year. The first meeting was held on June 22, 1908 in Minnetonka, Minnesota.

The organization began quarterly publication in 1914 of the Mississippi Valley Historical Review.

As the scholarly emphasis of the organization and its journal developed and spread over time, its initial emphasis on the Mississippi Valley came under sharp challenge from members who wanted a better title and a wider scope. On April 23, 1965, the MVHA formally changed its name to Organization of American Historians.

Ray Billington, OAH president in 1962–63, detailed four issues that arose and caused bitter quarreling during the discussion about the proposed name change in a 1978 Journal of American History essay: the desire to use the association's prestige to fight for liberal reforms, to change the association's name to represent a national scope, to democratize its oligarchical structure, and to take a firm stand against racial discrimination in terms of hotels and meeting cities. The reformers were successful and the Mississippi Valley Historical Review was renamed the Journal of American History and the organization, correspondingly, was renamed the Organization of American Historians the following year.

Indiana University was selected as home for the editorial offices of the Mississippi Valley Historical Review predecessor to the Journal of American History in 1963. Prior to relocating to Indiana, the editorial offices were located at Tulane University. The organization moved its business offices to Indiana in the summer of 1970 from its home on the campus of the University of Utah in Salt Lake City, Utah. The organization's headquarters are in Bloomington, Indiana on the campus of Indiana University in the historic Raintree House.

The OAH was admitted to the American Council of Learned Societies in 1971. It is a foundational partner of the National Coalition for History and the National Humanities Alliance.

== Advocacy ==
Guided by its mission, the OAH regularly advocates for the study, teaching, and presentation of American history, the equitable treatment of all those who work in the field, and public engagement with history. The OAH is a member of the National Humanities Alliance and National Coalition for History and regularly participates in advocacy efforts related to federal funding for the National Archives and Records Administration, the National Historical Publications and Records Administration, National Endowment for the Humanities, etc.

The Organization often submits amicus curiae briefs for matters being argued before the U.S. Supreme Court as well as district courts. In doing so it aims to present the court with an accurate account of the history of the cases being litigated. The OAH does not advocate for a particular legal standard rather, as a steward of history, it seeks to ensure that the Court is presented with accurate portrayals of American history. The most recently submitted brief was in the case of Dobbs v. Jackson Women's Health Organization. Previous briefs include those submitted for Perry v. Hollingsworth, U.S. v. Windsor, Obergefell v. Hodges, and In re: National Prescription Opiate Litigation.

Advocating for inclusive history education is another key component of the OAH's advocacy efforts. It is part of the Learn from History Coalition, which seeks to educate parents, teachers, and community members on how to support inclusive history in schools. And, in 2021 it began producing a public webinar series, The Future of the Past, that looks at the diverse history behind contemporary events, such as the January 6, 2021, Capitol riot.

== Governance ==
The Organization of American Historians is a 501(c)(3) non-profit incorporated in Nebraska in 1907. It is governed by an Executive Board, which is composed of OAH officers, former presidents who continue to serve for two years immediately succeeding their presidency, and nine elected members. The OAH Executive Committee is composed of the officers of the OAH and the immediate past president. Both the Executive Director and the Executive Editor serve on the board and executive committee as non-voting members. In addition to the Executive Board, there are forty-seven service and award committees made up of approximately 350 member volunteers who serve two or three year terms.

== Programs ==
The OAH Conference on American History brings together nearly 2,000 historians and features between 700 and 900 speakers participating in an average of 150 paper sessions, workshops, and events on all facets of American history over four days each spring. The central theme for each conference is determined by a program committee and the then president elect. The conference (previously the annual meeting) has been held every year since the organization began, with the exception of 1945 due to war time restrictions.

In 1994, the Organization began working with the National Park Service to produce a wide range of projects, including scholars' visits to national park sites, administrative histories, historic resource studies, national landmarks theme studies, peer review of interpretive material, curriculum development, and conferences and seminars. Since the date of the first cooperative agreement between the OAH and NPS, more than 100 reports have been produced for NPS units around the country. The OAH serves as the program manager, overseeing the historians working on the various projects and ensuring their timely completion.

The Distinguished Lectureship Program (DLP), the OAH speakers bureau, was established in 1980 by then president Gerda Lerner as a way of bringing the expertise of members to a broader audience. Each year a new roster historians are appointed to a three-year term. In addition to traditional, in-person events, the program began offering the option of virtual lectures in 2020.

== Publications ==
The Mississippi Valley Historical Review began in 1914 and was published quarterly under that name until 1962 when it was changed to the Journal of American History. The JAH is a quarterly, peer-reviewed publication and is the journal of record for the field of U.S. history. In addition to scholarly articles, it regularly publishes book reviews, movie reviews, public history reviews, digital humanities reviews, and, each March, a "Textbook and Teaching" section that is freely available on their publisher's, Oxford University Press, website. Additionally, one article each issue is designated "Editor's Choice" and is opened to the public. A nine-person editorial board guides the review and selection of articles for publication.

== List of Mississippi Valley Historical Association and OAH Presidents ==
=== Mississippi Valley Historical Association Presidents ===
- Francis A. Sampson (1907)
- Thomas M. Owen (1907–1908)
- Clarence W. Alvord (1908–1909)
- Orin G. Libby (1909–1910)
- Benjamin F. Shambaugh (1910–1911)
- Andrew C. McLaughlin (1911–1912)
- Reuben G. Thwaites (1912–1913)
- James A. James (1913–1914)
- Isaac Joslin Cox (1914–1915)
- Dunbar Rowland (1915–1916)
- Frederic L. Paxson (1916–1917)
- St. George L. Sioussat (1917–1918)
- Harlow Lindley (1918–1919)
- Milo M. Quaife (1919–1920)
- Chauncey S. Boucher (1920–1921)
- William E. Connelley (1921–1922)
- Solon J. Buck (1922–1923)
- Eugene C. Barker (1923–1924)
- Frank Heywood Hodder (1924–1925)
- James A. Woodburn (1925–1926)
- Otto L. Schmidt (1926–1927)
- Joseph Schafer (1927–1928)
- Charles W. Ramsdell (1928–1929)
- Homer C. Hockett (1929–1930)
- Louise P. Kellogg (1930–1931)
- Beverley W. Bond Jr. (1931–1932)
- John D. Hicks (1932–1933)
- Jonas Viles (1933–1934)
- Lester B. Shippee (1934–1935)
- Louis Pelzer (1935–1936)
- Edward E. Dale (1936–1937)
- Clarence E. Carter (1937–1938)
- William O. Lynch (1938–1939)
- James G. Randall (1939–1940)
- Carl F. Wittke (1940–1941)
- Arthur C. Cole (1941–1942)
- Charles H. Ambler (1942–1943)
- Theodore C. Blegen (1943–1944)
- William C. Binkley (1944–1946)
- Herbert A. Kellar (1946–1947)
- Ralph P. Bieber (1947–1948)
- Dwight L. Dumond (1948–1949)
- Carl C. Rister (1949–1950)
- Elmer Ellis (1950–1951)
- Merle E. Curti (1951–1952)
- James L. Sellers (1952–1953)
- Fred A. Shannon (1953–1954)
- Walter P. Webb (1954–1955)
- Edward C. Kirkland (1955–1956)
- Thomas D. Clark (1956–1957)
- Wendell H. Stephenson (1957–1958)
- William T. Hutchinson (1958–1959)
- Frederick Merk (1959–1960)
- Fletcher M. Green (1960–1961)
- Paul W. Gates (1961–1962)
- Ray Allen Billington (1962–1963)
- Avery O. Craven (1963–1964)

=== OAH Presidents ===
- John W. Caughey (1964–1965)
- George E. Mowry (1965–1966)
- Thomas C. Cochran (1966–1967)
- Thomas A. Bailey (1967–1968)
- C. Vann Woodward (1968–1969)
- Merrill Jensen (1969–1970)
- David M. Potter (1970–1971)
- Edmund S. Morgan (1971–1972)
- T. Harry Williams (1972–1973)
- John Higham (1973–1974)
- John Hope Franklin (1974–1975)
- Frank Freidel (1975–1976)
- Richard W. Leopold (1976–1977)
- Kenneth M. Stampp (1977–1978)
- Eugene D. Genovese (1978–1979)
- Carl N. Degler (1979–1980)
- William A. Williams (1980–1981)
- Gerda Lerner (1981–1982)
- Allan G. Bogue (1982–1983)
- Anne Firor Scott (1983–1984)
- Arthur S. Link (1984–1985)
- William E. Leuchtenburg (1985–1986)
- Leon F. Litwack (1986–1987)
- Stanley Nider Katz (1987–1988)
- David Brion Davis (1988–1989)
- Louis R. Harlan (1989–1990)
- Mary Frances Berry (1990–1991)
- Joyce Appleby (1991–1992)
- Lawrence W. Levine (1992–1993)
- Eric Foner (1993–1994)
- Gary B. Nash (1994–1995)
- Michael Kammen (1995–1996)
- Linda K. Kerber (1996–1997)
- George M. Fredrickson (1997–1998)
- William H. Chafe (1998–1999)
- David Montgomery (1999–2000)
- Kenneth T. Jackson (2000–2001)
- Darlene Clark Hine (2001–2002)
- Ira Berlin (2002–2003)
- Jacquelyn Dowd Hall (2003–2004)
- James O. Horton (2004–2005)
- Vicki Ruiz (2005–2006)
- Richard White (2006–2007)
- Nell Irvin Painter (2007–2008)
- Pete Daniel (2008–2009)
- Elaine Tyler May (2009–2010)
- David A. Hollinger (2010–2011)
- Alice Kessler-Harris (2011–2012)
- Albert Camarillo (2012–2013)
- Alan M. Kraut (2013–2014)
- Patricia Nelson Limerick (2014–2015)
- Jon Butler (2015–2016)
- Nancy F. Cott (2016–2017)
- Edward L. Ayers (2017–2018)
- Earl Lewis (2018–2019)
- Joanne Meyerowitz (2019–2020)
- George J. Sánchez (2020–2021)
- Philip J. Deloria (2021–2022)
- Erika Lee (2022–2023)
- Anthea M. Hartig (2023–2024)
- David Blight (2024–2025)
- Annette Gordon Reed (2025–2026)
- Marc Stein (2026-present)

== OAH Awards and Prizes ==
The following is a list of Awards and Prizes given by Organization of American Historians.

- Willi Paul Adams Award
- Erik Barnouw Award
- Ray Allen Billington Prize
- Binkley-Stephenson Award
- Civil War and Reconstruction Book Award (formerly the Avery O. Craven Award)
- Merle Curti Intellectual History Award
- Merle Curti Social History Award
- John D'Emilio LGBTQ History Dissertation Award
- Friend of History Award
- Ellis W. Hawley Prize
- OAH-IEHS John Higham Travel Grants
- John Higham Research Fellowship
- Darlene Clark Hine Award
- Huggins-Quarles Award
- JAAS Travel Grants
- Richard W. Leopold Prize
- Lerner–Scott Dissertation Prize – established in 1992 and named for Gerda Lerner and Anne Firor Scott
- Lawrence W. Levine Award
- Liberty Legacy Foundation Award
- Samuel and Marion Merrill Graduate Student Travel Grants
- David Montgomery Award
- Mary Nickliss Prize in U.S. Women's and/or Gender History
- OAH Presidents' Travel Fund for Emerging Historians
- Louis Pelzer Memorial Award
- James A. Rawley Prize
- Roy Rosenzweig Distinguished Service Award
- Stanton-Horton Award for Excellence in National Park Service History
- Tachau Teacher of the Year Award
- David Thelen Award
- Frederick Jackson Turner Award

== See also ==
- American Historical Association
