= 1929 Pulitzer Prize =

Awards for journalism and related fields

The following are the Pulitzer Prizes for 1929.

== Journalism awards ==
- Public Service:
  - New York Evening World, for its effective campaign to correct evils in the administration of justice, including the fight to curb "ambulance chasers," support of the "fence" bill, and measures to simplify procedure, prevent perjury and eliminate politics from municipal courts; a campaign which has been instrumental in securing remedial action.
  - Honorable mentions:
    - The Brooklyn Daily Eagle, "for its campaign against 'ambulance chasers' which supplemented the work of the New York Evening World".
    - Chicago Tribune, "for its work in connection with the primary election".
    - St. Paul Dispatch and Pioneer Press, "for its campaign for conservation of forests".
- Reporting:
  - Paul Y. Anderson of the St. Louis Post-Dispatch, for his highly effective work in bringing to light a situation which resulted in revealing the disposition of Liberty Bonds purchased and distributed by the Continental Trading Company in connection with naval oil leases.
- Correspondence:
  - Paul Scott Mowrer of the Chicago Daily News, for his coverage of international affairs including the Franco-British Naval Pact and Germany's campaign for revision of the Dawes Plan.
- Editorial Writing:
  - Louis Isaac Jaffe of The Virginian-Pilot, for "An Unspeakable Act of Savagery", "which is typical of a series of articles written on the lynching evil and in successful advocacy of legislation to prevent it".

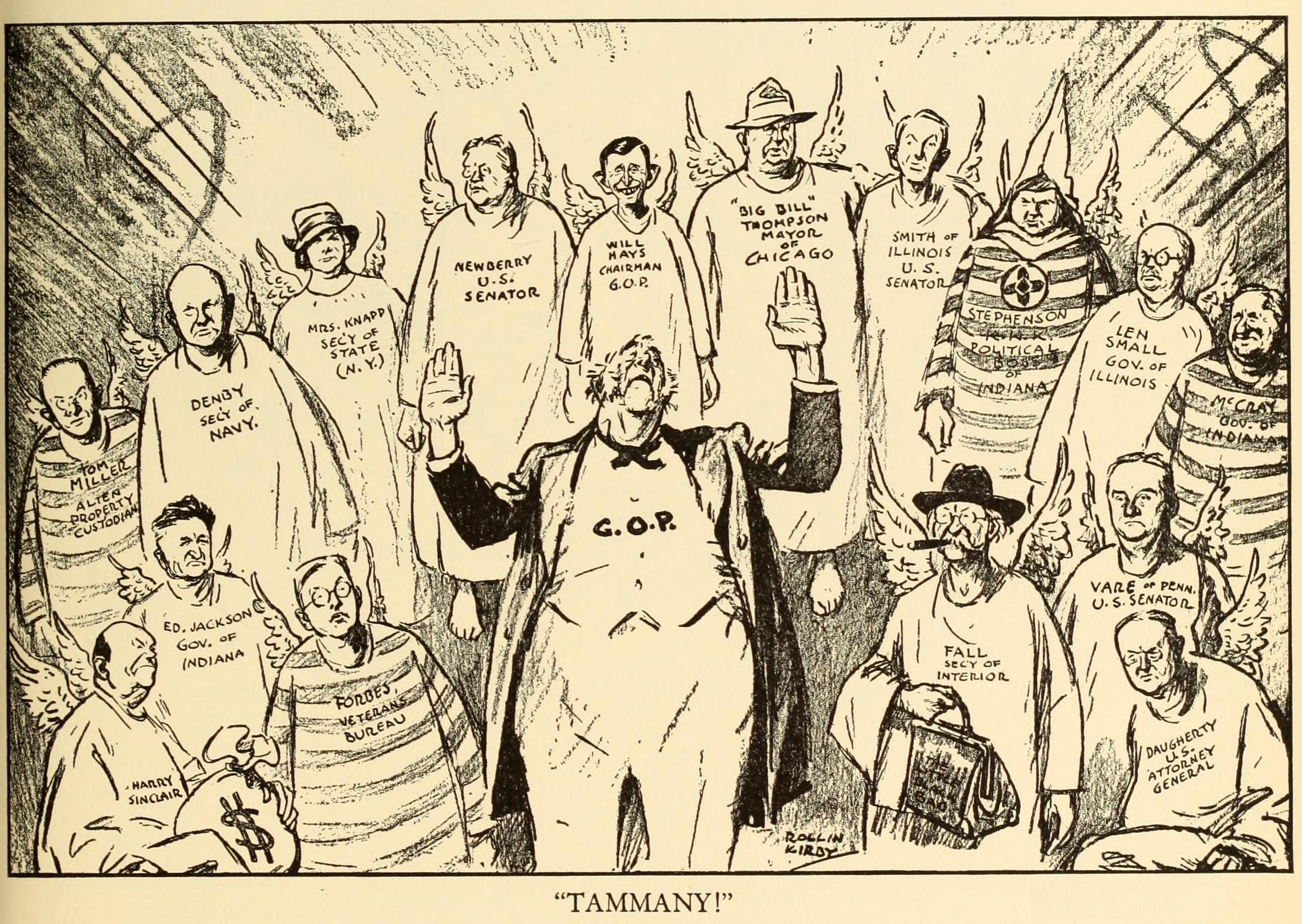
"Tammany!", the winning editorial cartoon, portrayed the Republican Party as hypocritical for decrying the Democratic Tammany Hall machine while many Republicans had themselves committed corrupt acts.

- Editorial Cartooning:
  - Rollin Kirby of the New York World, for "Tammany!"

== Letters and Drama Awards ==
- Novel:
  - Scarlet Sister Mary by Julia Peterkin (Bobbs)
- Drama:
  - Street Scene by Elmer Rice (S. French)
- History:
  - The Organization and Administration of the Union Army, 1861–1865 by Fred Albert Shannon (A.H. Clark)
- Biography or Autobiography:
  - The Training of an American: The Earlier Life and Letters of Walter H. Page by Burton J. Hendrick (Houghton)
- Poetry:
  - John Brown's Body by Stephen Vincent Benét (Farrar)
