= Pulitzer Prize for History =

American award for history books

The Pulitzer Prize for History, administered by Columbia University, is one of the seven American Pulitzer Prizes that are annually awarded for Letters, Drama, and Music. It has been presented since 1917 for a distinguished book about the history of the United States. Thus it is one of the original Pulitzers, for the program was inaugurated in 1917 with seven prizes, four of which were awarded that year. The Pulitzer Prize program has also recognized some historical work with its Biography prize, from 1917, and its General Nonfiction prize, from 1962.

Finalists have been announced since 1980, ordinarily two others beside the winner.

== Winners ==
In its first 97 years to 2013, the History Pulitzer was awarded 95 times. Two prizes were given in 1989; none in 1919, 1984, and 1994.

=== 1910s–1970s ===
Pulitzer Prize for History winners, 1917–1979
Year	Author	Title	Ref.
1917	Jean Jules Jusserand	With Americans of Past and Present Days	
1918	James Ford Rhodes	A History of the Civil War, 1861–1865	
1919	No award presented		
1920	Justin H. Smith	The War with Mexico	
1921	William Sowden Sims and Burton J. Hendrick	The Victory at Sea	
1922	James Truslow Adams	The Founding of New England	
1923	Charles Warren	The Supreme Court in United States History	
1924	Charles Howard McIlwain	The American Revolution: A Constitutional Interpretation	
1925	Frederic L. Paxson	History of the American Frontier (Note: The 1925 jury shortlisted The American States during and after the Revolution, 1775–1789 by Allan Nevins and The Colonial Background of the American Revolution by Charles McLean Andrews.)	
1926	Edward Channing	A History of the United States, Vol. VI: The War for Southern Independence (1849–1865) (Note: The 1926 jury shortlisted Great Britain and the American Civil War by Ephraim Douglass Adams, Jefferson and Hamilton: The Struggle for Democracy in America by Claude G. Bowers and L'Esprit Révolutionnaire en France et aux États-Unis à la Fin du XVIIIe Siècle by Bernard Faÿ.)	
1927	Samuel Flagg Bemis	Pinckney's Treaty	
1928	Vernon Louis Parrington	Main Currents in American Thought	
1929	Fred Albert Shannon	The Organization and Administration of the Union Army, 1861–1865	
1930	Claude H. Van Tyne†	The War of Independence (Note: The 1930 jury, consisting of three individuals, saw two of its members vote for The Tragic Era: The Revolution after Lincoln by Claude G. Bowers for the prize, while one member voted for The War of Independence by Claude H. Van Tyne. The Pulitzer board gave the prize to the latter.)	
1931	Bernadotte E. Schmitt	The Coming of the War, 1914 (Note: The 1931 jury shortlisted Builders of the Bay Colony: A Gallery of Our Intellectual Ancestors by Samuel Eliot Morison.)	
1932	John J. Pershing	My Experiences in the World War (Note: The 1932 jury also considered The Epic of America by James Truslow Adams, King Cotton Diplomacy: Foreign Relations of the Confederate States of America by Frank Lawrence Owsley and The Martial Spirit: A Study of Our War with Spain by Walter Millis.)	
1933	Frederick Jackson Turner†	The Significance of Sections in American History (Note: The 1933 jury was split, with two members recommending the eventual winner The Significance of Sections in American History by Frederick Jackson Turner. The third juror submitted a minority opinion recommending Our Times: The United States, 1900–1925: Over Here, 1914–1918 by Mark Sullivan.)	
1934	Herbert Agar	The People's Choice (Note: The 1934 jury considered Divided Loyalties: Americans in England during the War of Independence by Lewis Einstein and Our Earliest Colonial Settlements: Their Diversities of Origin and Later Characteristics by Charles McLean Andrews. The Pulitzer board made an independent decision in giving the prize to The People's Choice by Herbert Agar.)	
1935	Charles McLean Andrews	The Colonial Period of American History (Note: The 1935 jury shortlisted The First Year of the American Revolution by Allen French.)	
1936	Andrew C. McLaughlin	A Constitutional History of the United States	
1937	Van Wyck Brooks	The Flowering of New England, 1815–1865	
1938	Paul Herman Buck	The Road to Reunion, 1865–1900 (Note: The 1938 jury shortlisted A History of Chicago — Volume 1: The Beginning of a City, 1673–1848 by Bessie Louise Pierce and A History of the Monroe Doctrine by Dexter Perkins.)	
1939	Frank Luther Mott	A History of American Magazines	
1940	Carl Sandburg	Abraham Lincoln: The War Years (Note: The 1940 jury shortlisted, in order, The Rise of New York Port, 1815–1860 by Robert G. Albion, Canadian-American Relations, 1849–1874 by Lester Burrell Shippee, The New England Mind: The Seventeenth Century by Perry Miller and America in Midpassage by Charles A. Beard and Mary Ritter Beard.)	
1941	Marcus Lee Hansen†	The Atlantic Migration, 1607–1860 (Note: The 1941 jury shortlisted, in order, Norwegian Migration to America: The American Transition by Theodore C. Blegen and The Course of American Democratic Thought: An Intellectual History Since 1815 by Ralph Henry Gabriel.)	
1942	Margaret Leech	Reveille in Washington, 1860–1865 (Note: The 1942 jury shortlisted, in order, Hands Off: A History of the Monroe Doctrine by Dexter Perkins, The Hero in America: A Chronicle of Hero-Worship by Dixon Wecter, The Continental Congress by Edmund Cody Burnett and Secret History of the American Revolution by Carl Van Doren.)	
1943	Esther Forbes	Paul Revere and the World He Lived In (Note: The 1943 jury shortlisted, in order, The Hidden Civil War: The Story of the Copperheads by Wood Gray and Lee's Lieutenants — Volume 1: Manassas to Malvern Hill by Douglas Southall Freeman.)	
1944	Merle Curti	The Growth of American Thought (Note: The 1944 jury shortlisted, in order, The Year of Decision: 1846 by Bernard DeVoto and The Latin American Policy of the United States by Samuel Flagg Bemis.)	
1945	Stephen Bonsal	Unfinished Business (Note: The 1944 jury shortlisted, in order, Lee's Lieutenants — Volume 3: Gettysburg to Appomattox by Douglas Southall Freeman, When Johnny Comes Marching Home by Dixon Wecter and The Completion of Independence, 1790–1830 by John Allen Krout and Dixon Ryan Fox. They also commended Freedom's Ferment: Phases of American Social History to 1860 by Alice Felt Tyler, Woodrow Wilson and the Lost Peace and Thomas A. Bailey and America and Two Wars by Dexter Perkins. The Pulitzer board made their own selection and awarded Unfinished Business by Stephen Bonsal.)	
1946	Arthur M. Schlesinger Jr.	The Age of Jackson	
1947	James Phinney Baxter III	Scientists against Time (Note: The 1947 jury shortlisted, in order, The British Empire before the American Revolution by Lawrence Henry Gipson, Lincoln's War Cabinet by Burton J. Hendrick, The Beleaguered City: Richmond, 1861–1865 by Alfred H. Bill and Arsenal of Democracy by Donald Nelson.)	
1948	Bernard DeVoto	Across the Wide Missouri (Note: The 1948 jury shortlisted, in order, History of United States Naval Operations in World War II by Samuel Eliot Morison, Ordeal of the Union by Allan Nevins, Postscript to Yesterday by Lloyd Morris and The Puritan Oligarchy by Thomas J. Wertenbaker.)	
1949	Roy Franklin Nichols	The Disruption of American Democracy (Note: The 1949 jury shortlisted Literary History of the United States edited by Robert E. Spiller, Willard Thorp, Thomas H. Johnson and Henry Seidel Canby and Men, Cities, and Transportation: A Study in New England History, 1820–1900 by Edward C. Kirkland.)	
1950	Oliver W. Larkin	Art and Life in America (Note: The 1950 jury placed eventual winner Art and Life in America by Oliver W. Larkin second on their shortlist. Their first choice was The Great War for the Empire by Lawrence Henry Gipson, while the rest of the shortlist included Coral Sea, Midway, and Submarine Actions and The Struggle for Guadalcanal (the fourth and fifth volumes of History of United States Naval Operations in World War II) by Samuel Eliot Morison, Steamboats on the Western Rivers by Louis C. Hunter and John Quincy Adams and the Foundations of American Foreign Policy by Samuel Flagg Bemis (which won the Pulitzer Prize for Biography).)	
1951	R. Carlyle Buley	The Old Northwest, Pioneer Period 1815–1840 (Note: The 1951 jury shortlisted, in order, The Papers of Thomas Jefferson edited by Julian P. Boyd, And the War Came: The North and the Secession Crisis, 1860–1861 by Kenneth M. Stampp, Church and State in the United States by Anson Phelps Stokes Jr. and Breaking the Bismarcks Barrier (the sixth volume of History of United States Naval Operations in World War II) by Samuel Eliot Morison.)	
1952	Oscar Handlin	The Uprooted	
1953	George Dangerfield	The Era of Good Feelings (Note: The 1953 jury shortlisted, in order, The Challenge to Isolation, 1937–1940 by William L. Langer and S. Everett Gleason, Refugees of Revolution: The German Forty-Eighters in America by Carl Frederick Wittke, The Life of Billy Yank: The Common Soldier of the Union by Bell I. Wiley and Lincoln and His Generals by T. Harry Williams.)	
1954	Bruce Catton	A Stillness at Appomattox	
1955	Paul Horgan	Great River: The Rio Grande in North American History (Note: The 1955 jury shortlisted Main Street on the Middle Border by Lewis Eldon Atherton, The Jacksonians: A Study in Administrative History 1829–1861 by Leonard D. White, A History of the Southern Confederacy by Clement Eaton and Americans Interpret Their Civil War by Thomas J. Pressly.)	
1956	Richard Hofstadter	The Age of Reform (Note: The 1956 jury shortlisted, in order, The Development of Academic Freedom in the United States by Richard Hofstadter and Walter P. Metzger, Cities in Revolt: Urban Life in America, 1743–1776 by Carl Bridenbaugh, Strangers in the Land: Patterns of American Nativism, 1860–1925 by John Higham and Pioneering in Big Business (1882–1911) by Ralph W. Hidy and Muriel E. Hidy.)	
1957	George F. Kennan	Russia Leaves the War: Soviet-American Relations, 1917–1920 (Note: The 1957 jury shortlisted, in order, Errand into the Wilderness by Perry Miller, The Peculiar Institution: Slavery in the Antebellum South by Kenneth M. Stampp, Wilson: The New Freedom by Arthur S. Link, Theodore Roosevelt and the Rise of America to World Power by Howard K. Beale and The Militant South, 1800–1861 by John Hope Franklin.)	
1958	Bray Hammond	Banks and Politics in America (Note: The 1958 jury shortlisted The United States and East Central Europe, 1914–1918 by Victor S. Mamatey, The Crisis of the Old Order: 1919–1933 by Arthur M. Schlesinger Jr., Churchill, Roosevelt, Stalin: The War They Waged and the Peace They Sought by Herbert Feis and A History of American Magazines, 1885–1905 by Frank Luther Mott.)	
1959	Leonard D. White† and Jean Schneider	The Republican Era: 1869–1901 (Note: The 1959 jury shortlisted The Civil War: A Narrative by Shelby Foote, The Americans: The Colonial Experience by Daniel J. Boorstin and The Era of Theodore Roosevelt by George E. Mowry.)	
1960	Margaret Leech	In the Days of McKinley (Note: The 1960 jury placed eventual winner In the Days of McKinley by Margaret Leech third on their shortlist. Their first choice was The End of American Innocence: A Study of the First Years of Our Own Time, 1912–1917 by Henry F. May and their second choice was The Angry Scar: The Story of Reconstruction by Hodding Carter.)	
1961	Herbert Feis	Between War and Peace: The Potsdam Conference (Note: The 1961 jury shortlisted The Federalist Era, 1789–1801 by John Chester Miller and Origin of the American Revolution: 1759–1766 by Bernhard Knollenberg.)	
1962	Lawrence H. Gipson	The Triumphant Empire: Thunder-Clouds Gather in the West, 1763–1766 (Note: The 1962 jury shortlisted, in order, The Emerging South by Thomas D. Clark and The Growth of Southern Civilization, 1790–1860 by Clement Eaton.)	
1963	Constance McLaughlin Green	Washington: Village and Capital, 1800–1878 (Note: The 1963 jury shortlisted, in order, Puritans and Yankees: The Winthrop Dynasty of New England by Richard Slator Dunn and Mr. Wilson's War: From the Assassination of McKinley to the Defeat of the League of Nations by John Dos Passos.)	
1964	Sumner Chilton Powell	Puritan Village: The Formation of a New England Town (Note: The 1964 jury shortlisted The Civil War: A Narrative, Vol. 2 — Fredericksburg to Meridian by Shelby Foote and Here Lies Virginia: An Archaeologist's View of Colonial Life and History by Ivor Noël Hume.)	
1965	Irwin Unger	The Greenback Era: A Social and Political History of American Finance, 1865–1879 (Note: The 1965 jury placed eventual winner The Greenback Era: A Social and Political History of American Finance, 1865–1879 by Irwin Unger third on their shortlist. Their first choice was When the Cheering Stopped: The Last Years of Woodrow Wilson by Eugene Owen Smith and their second choice was Diplomat among Warriors by Robert Daniel Murphy.)	
1966	Perry Miller†	The Life of the Mind in America (Note: The majority of the 1966 jury recommended The Peacemakers: The Great Powers and American Independence by Richard B. Morris while a minority recommended the eventual winner The Life of the Mind in America by Perry Miller.)	
1967	William H. Goetzmann	Exploration and Empire: The Explorer and the Scientist in the Winning of the American West (Note: The 1967 jury shortlisted The Monroe Doctrine and American Expansionism, 1843–1849 by Frederick Merk, Congress and the Constitution: A Study of Responsibility by Donald G. Morgan, The Quasi-War: The Politics and Diplomacy of the Undeclared War. With France 1797–1801 By Alexander DeConde, The Gentle Reformers: Massachusetts Democrats in the Cleveland Era by Geoffrey Blodgett and The Washington Community, 1800–1828 by James Sterling Young.)	
1968	Bernard Bailyn	The Ideological Origins of the American Revolution (Note: The 1968 jury shortlisted The Emergence of the New South, 1913–1945 by George Brown Tindall, The Democratic Republicans of New York: The Origins, 1763–1797 by Alfred F. Young, From the Morgenthau Diaries: Years of War, 1941–1945 by John Morton Blum and America's Western Frontiers: The Exploration and Settlement of the Trans-Mississippi West by John A. Hawgood.)	
1969	Leonard W. Levy	Origins of the Fifth Amendment: The Right against Self-Incrimination (Note: The 1969 jury shortlisted The Best Men: Liberal Reformers in the Gilded Age by John G. Sproat and White over Black: American Attitudes toward the Negro, 1550–1812 by Winthrop D. Jordan.)	
1970	Dean Acheson	Present at the Creation: My Years in the State Department (Note: The 1970 jury shortlisted, in order, The Creation of the American Republic, 1776–1787 by Gordon S. Wood, Grant Takes Command by Bruce Catton and The Harding Era: Warren G. Harding and His Administration by Robert K. Murray.)	
1971	James MacGregor Burns	Roosevelt: The Soldier of Freedom (Note: The 1971 jury shortlisted American Education: The Colonial Experience, 1607–1783 by Lawrence A. Cremin and Sibley's Harvard Graduates Vol. 15, the Classes of 1761–1763 by Clifford K. Shipton.)	
1972	Carl N. Degler	Neither Black nor White: Slavery and Race Relations in Brazil and the United States (Note: The 1972 jury shortlisted, in order, The Rivals: America and Russia since World War II by Adam Ulam and The European Discovery of America by Samuel Eliot Morison.)	
1973	Michael Kammen	People of Paradox: An Inquiry Concerning the Origins of American Civilization (Note: The 1973 jury shortlisted The Slave Community: Plantation Life in the Antebellum South by John W. Blassingame, The Great Bridge by David McCullough, The Glorious Revolution in America by David S. Lovejoy, A Religious History of the American People by Sydney E. Ahlstrom and From Resistance to Revolution: Colonial Radicals and the Development of American Opposition to Britain, 1765–1776 by Pauline Maier.)	
1974	Daniel J. Boorstin	The Americans: The Democratic Experience (Note: The 1974 jury shortlisted The Other Bostonians: Poverty and Progress in the American Metropolis, 1880–1970 by Stephan Thernstrom.)	
1975	Dumas Malone	Jefferson and His Time (Note: The 1975 jury recommended the eventual winner Jefferson and His Time for a special citation rather than for the prize in History or Biography. The jury had unanimously recommended Salem Possessed: The Social Origins of Witchcraft by Paul Boyer and Stephen Nissenbaum for the prize and further shortlisted, in order, All God's Dangers: The Life of Nate Shaw by Theodore Rosengarten and Roll, Jordan, Roll: The World the Slaves Made by Eugene Genovese.)	
1976	Paul Horgan	Lamy of Santa Fe (Note: The 1976 jury shortlisted A World Destroyed: Hiroshima and Its Legacies by Martin J. Sherwin, The Invasion of America: Indians, Colonialism, and the Cant of Conquest by Francis Jennings, The Making of the Monroe Doctrine by Ernest R. May, Special Envoy to Churchill and Stalin, 1941–1946 by W. Averell Harriman and Elie Abel, and Eagle and Sword: The Federalists and the Creation of the Military Establishment in America, 1783–1802 by Richard H. Kohn.)	
1977	David M. Potter† (Completed and edited by Don E. Fehrenbacher)	The Impending Crisis, 1848–1861 (Note: The 1977 jury shortlisted The Black Family in Slavery and Freedom, 1750–1925 by Herbert Gutman, Atlas of Early American History: The Revolutionary Era, 1760–1790 by Lester J. Cappon, World of Our Fathers: The Journey of the East European Jews to America and the Life They Found and Made by Irving Howe, Simple Justice: The History of Brown v. Board of Education and Black America's Struggle for Equality by Richard Kluger, The Enlightenment in America by Henry F. May, The Abolitionist Legacy: From Reconstruction to the NAACP by James M. McPherson and Roosevelt and Churchill, 1939–1941: The Partnership That Saved the West by Joseph P. Lash.)	
1978	Alfred D. Chandler, Jr.	The Visible Hand: The Managerial Revolution in American Business	
1979	Don E. Fehrenbacher	The Dred Scott Case: Its Significance in American Law and Politics (Note: The 1979 jury placed eventual winner The Dred Scott Case: Its Significance in American Law and Politics by Don E. Fehrenbacher second on their shortlist. Their first choice was Rockdale: The Growth of an American Village in the Early Industrial Revolution by Anthony F. C. Wallace. They also shortlisted The Protestant Temperament: Patterns of Child-Rearing, Religious Experience, and the Self in Early America by Philip Greven.)	

=== 1980s ===
Entries from this point on include the finalists listed after the winner for each year.

Pulitzer Prize for History winners, 1980–1989
Year	Author	Title	Result	Ref.
1980	Leon F. Litwack	Been in the Storm So Long: The Aftermath of Slavery	Winner	
1980	Gary B. Nash	The Urban Crucible: Social Change, Political Consciousness and the Origins of the American Revolution	Finalist	
1980	John B. Unruh	The Plains Across: The Overland Emigrants on the Trans-Mississippi West, 1840–60	Finalist	
1981	Lawrence A. Cremin	American Education: The National Experience, 1783–1876	Winner	
1981	David M. Kennedy	Over Here: The First World War and American Society	Finalist	
1981	Lyle Koehler	A Search for Power: The 'Weaker Sex' in Seventeenth Century New England	Finalist	
1982	C. Vann Woodward	Mary Chesnut's Civil War	Winner	
1982	George M. Fredrickson	White Supremacy: A Comparative Study in American and South African History	Finalist	
1982	Akira Iriye	Power and Culture: The Japanese-American War, 1941–1945	Finalist	
1983	Rhys L. Isaac	The Transformation of Virginia, 1740–1790	Winner	
1983	Robert Middlekauff	The Glorious Cause: The American Revolution, 1763–1789	Finalist	
1983	Bertram Wyatt-Brown	Southern Honor: Ethics and Behavior in the Old South	Finalist	
1984	No Award presented			
1985	Thomas K. McCraw	Prophets of Regulation: Charles Francis Adams, Louis D. Brandeis, James M. Landis, Alfred E. Kahn	Winner	
1985	Francis Paul Prucha	The Great Father: The United States Government and the American Indians	Finalist	
1985	Joel Williamson	The Crucible of Race: Black-White Relations in the American South since Emancipation	Finalist	
1986	Walter A. McDougall	...the Heavens and the Earth: A Political History of the Space Age	Winner	
1986	Jacqueline Jones	Labor of Love, Labor of Sorrow: Black Women, Work and the Family from Slavery to the Present	Finalist	
1986	Forrest McDonald	Novus Ordo Seclorum: the Intellectual Origins of the Constitution	Finalist	
1986	Kerby A. Miller	Emigrants and Exiles: Ireland and the Irish Exodus to North America	Finalist	
1987	Bernard Bailyn	Voyagers to the West: A Passage in the Peopling of America on the Eve of the Revolution	Winner	
1987	David Eisenhower	Eisenhower: At War, 1943–1945	Finalist	
1987	David Garrow	Bearing the Cross: Martin Luther King, Jr., and the Southern Christian Leadership Conference	Finalist	
1988	Robert V. Bruce	The Launching of Modern American Science, 1846–1876	Winner	
1988	David Montgomery	The Fall of the House of Labor: The Workplace, the State, and American Labor Activism, 1865–1925	Finalist	
1988	Charles E. Rosenberg	The Care of Strangers: The Rise of America's Hospital System	Finalist	
1989	Taylor Branch	Parting the Waters: America in the King Years, 1954-1963	Winner	
1989	James M. McPherson	Battle Cry of Freedom: The Civil War Era	Winner	
1989	Eric Foner	Reconstruction: America's Unfinished Revolution – 1863–1877	Finalist	
1989	Neil Sheehan	A Bright Shining Lie: John Paul Vann and America in Vietnam	Finalist	

=== 1990s ===
Pulitzer Prize for History winners, 1990–1999
Year	Author	Title	Result	Ref.
1990	Stanley Karnow	In Our Image: America's Empire in the Philippines	Winner	
1990	Hugh Honour	The Image of the Black in Western Art, Volume IV: From the American Revolution to World War I	Finalist	
1990	Thomas P. Hughes	American Genesis: A Century of Invention and Technological Enthusiasm 1870–1970	Finalist	
1991	Laurel Thatcher Ulrich	A Midwife's Tale	Winner	
1991	Lizabeth Cohen	Making a New Deal: Industrial Workers in Chicago, 1919–1939	Finalist	
1991	Hugh Davis Graham	The Civil Rights Era: Origins and Development of National Policy	Finalist	
1991	Kenneth M. Stampp	America in 1857: A Nation on the Brink	Finalist	
1992	Mark E. Neely, Jr.	The Fate of Liberty: Abraham Lincoln and Civil Liberties	Winner	
1992	William Cronon	Nature's Metropolis: Chicago and the Great West	Finalist	
1992	Theodore Draper	A Very Thin Line: The Iran-Contra Affairs	Finalist	
1992	John Frederick Martin	Profits in the Wilderness: Entrepreneurship and the Founding of New England Towns in the Seventeenth Century	Finalist	
1992	Richard White	The Middle Ground: Indians, Empires, and Republics in the Great Lakes Region, 1650–1815	Finalist	
1993	Gordon S. Wood	The Radicalism of the American Revolution	Winner	
1993	Edward L. Ayers	The Promise of the New South: Life after Reconstruction	Finalist	
1993	Garry Wills	Lincoln at Gettysburg: The Words That Remade America	Finalist	
1994	No award given			
1994	Lawrence M. Friedman	Crime and Punishment in American History	Finalist	
1994	Gerald Posner	Case Closed: Lee Harvey Oswald and the Assassination of JFK	Finalist	
1994	Joel Williamson	William Faulkner and Southern History	Finalist	
1995	Doris Kearns Goodwin	No Ordinary Time: Franklin and Eleanor Roosevelt: The Home Front in World War II	Winner	
1995	James Goodman	Stories of Scottsboro	Finalist	
1995	Merrill D. Peterson	Lincoln in American Memory	Finalist	
1996	Alan Taylor	William Cooper's Town: Power and Persuasion on the Frontier of the Early American Republic	Winner	
1996	Lance Banning	The Sacred Fire of Liberty: James Madison and the Founding of the Federal Republic	Finalist	
1996	Richard Rhodes	Dark Sun: The Making of the Hydrogen Bomb	Finalist	
1997	Jack N. Rakove	Original Meanings: Politics and Ideas in the Making of the Constitution	Winner	
1997	Stephen Nissenbaum	The Battle for Christmas: A Cultural History of America's Most Cherished Holiday	Finalist	
1997	Mary Beth Norton	Founding Mothers and Fathers: Gendered Power and the Forming of American Society	Finalist	
1998	Edward J. Larson	Summer for the Gods: The Scopes Trial and America's Continuing Debate over Science and Religion	Winner	
1998	J. Anthony Lukas	Big Trouble: A Murder in a Small Western Town Sets off a Struggle for the Soul of America	Finalist	
1998	Rogers Smith	Civic Ideals: Conflicting Visions of Citizenship in U.S. History	Finalist	
1999	Edwin G. Burrows and Mike Wallace	Gotham: A History of New York City to 1898	Winner	
1999	William E. Burrows	This New Ocean: The Story of the First Space Age	Finalist	
1999	Paula Mitchell Marks	In a Barren Land: American Indian Dispossession and Survival	Finalist	

=== 2000s ===
Pulitzer Prize for History winners, 2000–2009
Year	Author	Title	Result	Ref.
2000	David M. Kennedy	Freedom from Fear: The American People in Depression and War	Winner	
2000	James H. Merrell	Into the American Woods: Negotiators on the Pennsylvania Frontier	Finalist	
2000	Kevin Phillips	The Cousins' Wars: Religion, Politics and the Triumph of Anglo-America	Finalist	
2001	Joseph J. Ellis	Founding Brothers: The Revolutionary Generation	Winner	
2001	Frances FitzGerald	Way Out There in the Blue: Reagan, Star Wars and the End of the Cold War	Finalist	
2001	Alexander Keyssar	The Right to Vote: The Contested History of Democracy in the United States	Finalist	
2002	Louis Menand	The Metaphysical Club: A Story of Ideas in America	Winner	
2002	J. William Harris	Deep Souths: Delta, Piedmont, and the Sea Island Society in the Age of Segregation	Finalist	
2002	Daniel K. Richter	Facing East from Indian Country: A Native History of Early America	Finalist	
2003	Rick Atkinson	An Army at Dawn: The War in North Africa, 1942–1943	Winner	
2003	Philip Dray	At the Hands of Persons Unknown: The Lynching of Black America	Finalist	
2003	Helen Lefkowitz Horowitz	Rereading Sex: Battles over Sexual Knowledge and Suppression in Nineteenth Century America	Finalist	
2004	Steven Hahn	A Nation Under Our Feet: Black Political Struggles in the Rural South from Slavery to the Great Migration	Winner	
2004	David Maraniss	They Marched into Sunlight: War and Peace, Vietnam and America, October 1967	Finalist	
2004	Daniel Okrent	Great Fortune: The Epic of Rockefeller Center	Finalist	
2005	David Hackett Fischer	Washington's Crossing	Winner	
2005	Kevin Boyle	Arc of Justice: A Saga of Race, Civil Rights, and Murder in the Jazz Age	Finalist	
2005	Michael O'Brien	Conjectures of Order: Intellectual Life and the American South, 1810-1860, volumes 1 & 2	Finalist	
2006	David Oshinsky	Polio: An American Story	Winner	
2006	Jill Lepore	New York Burning: Liberty, Slavery, and Conspiracy in Eighteenth-Century Manhattan	Finalist	
2006	Sean Wilentz	The Rise of American Democracy: Jefferson to Lincoln	Finalist	
2007	Gene Roberts and Hank Klibanoff	The Race Beat: The Press, the Civil Rights Struggle, and the Awakening of a Nation	Winner	
2007	James T. Campbell	Middle Passages: African American Journeys to Africa, 1787-2005	Finalist	
2007	Nathaniel Philbrick	Mayflower: A Story of Courage, Community, and War	Finalist	
2008	Daniel Walker Howe	What Hath God Wrought: The Transformation of America, 1815–1848	Winner	
2008	Robert Dallek	Nixon and Kissinger: Partners in Power	Finalist	
2008	David Halberstam	The Coldest Winter: America and the Korean War	Finalist	
2009	Annette Gordon-Reed	The Hemingses of Monticello: An American Family	Winner	
2009	Drew Gilpin Faust	This Republic of Suffering: Death and the American Civil War	Finalist	
2009	G. Calvin Mackenzie and Robert Weisbrot	The Liberal Hour: Washington and the Politics of Change in the 1960s	Finalist	

=== 2010s ===
Pulitzer Prize for History winners, 2010–2019
Year	Author	Title	Result	Ref.
2010	Liaquat Ahamed	Lords of Finance: The Bankers Who Broke the World	Winner	
2010	Greg Grandin	Fordlandia: The Rise and Fall of Henry Ford's Forgotten Jungle City	Finalist	
2010	Gordon S. Wood	Empire of Liberty: A History of the Early Republic, 1789–1815	Finalist	
2011	Eric Foner	The Fiery Trial: Abraham Lincoln and American Slavery	Winner	
2011	Stephanie McCurry	Confederate Reckoning: Power and Politics in the Civil War South	Finalist	
2011	Michael J. Rawson	Eden on the Charles: The Making of Boston	Finalist	
2012	Manning Marable†	Malcolm X: A Life of Reinvention	Winner	
2012	Anne F. Hyde	Empires, Nations, and Families: A History of the North American West, 1800-1860	Finalist	
2012	Anthony Summers and Robbyn Swan	The Eleventh Day: The Full Story of 9/11 and Osama Bin Laden	Finalist	
2012	Richard White	Railroaded: The Transcontinentals and the Making of Modern America	Finalist	
2013	Fredrik Logevall	Embers of War: The Fall of an Empire and the Making of America's Vietnam	Winner	
2013	Bernard Bailyn	The Barbarous Years: The Peopling of British North America: The Conflict of Civilizations, 1600-1675	Finalist	
2013	John Fabian Witt	Lincoln's Code: The Laws of War in American History	Finalist	
2014	Alan Taylor	The Internal Enemy: Slavery and War in Virginia, 1772-1832	Winner	
2014	Jacqueline Jones	A Dreadful Deceit: The Myth of Race from the Colonial Era to Obama's America	Finalist	
2014	Eric Schlosser	Command and Control: Nuclear Weapons, the Damascus Accident, and the Illusion of Safety	Finalist	
2015	Elizabeth A. Fenn	Encounters at the Heart of the World: A History of the Mandan People	Winner	
2015	Sven Beckert	Empire of Cotton: A Global History	Finalist	
2015	Nick Bunker	An Empire on the Edge: How Britain Came to Fight America	Finalist	
2016	T. J. Stiles	Custer's Trials: A Life on the Frontier of a New America	Winner	
2016	Annie Jacobsen	The Pentagon's Brain: An Uncensored History of DARPA, America's Top-Secret Military Research Agency	Finalist	
2016	Brian Matthew Jordan	Marching Home: Union Veterans and Their Unending Civil War	Finalist	
2016	James M. Scott	Target Tokyo: Jimmy Doolittle and the Raid That Avenged Pearl Harbor	Finalist	
2017	Heather Ann Thompson	Blood in the Water: The Attica Prison Uprising of 1971 and Its Legacy	Winner	
2017	Larrie D. Ferreiro	Brothers at Arms: American Independence and the Men of France and Spain Who Saved It	Finalist	
2017	Wendy Warren	New England Bound: Slavery and Colonization in Early America	Finalist	
2018	Jack E. Davis	The Gulf: The Making of an American Sea	Winner	
2018	Kim Phillips-Fein	Fear City: New York's Fiscal Crisis and the Rise of Austerity Politics	Finalist	
2018	Steven J. Ross	Hitler in Los Angeles: How Jews Foiled Nazi Plots against Hollywood and America	Finalist	
2019	David W. Blight	Frederick Douglass: Prophet of Freedom	Winner	
2019	W. Fitzhugh Brundage	Civilizing Torture: An American Tradition	Finalist	
2019	Victoria Johnson	American Eden: David Hosack, Botany, and Medicine in the Garden of the Early Republic	Finalist	

=== 2020s ===
Pulitzer Prize for History winners, 2020–present
Year	Author	Title	Result	Ref.
2020	W. Caleb McDaniel	Sweet Taste of Liberty: A True Story of Slavery and Restitution in America	Winner	
2020	Greg Grandin	The End of the Myth: From the Frontier to the Border Wall in the Mind of America	Finalist	
2020	Keeanga-Yamahtta Taylor	Race for Profit: How Banks and the Real Estate Industry Undermined Black Homeownership	Finalist	
2021	Marcia Chatelain	Franchise: The Golden Arches in Black America	Winner	
2021	Eric Cervini	The Deviant's War: The Homosexual vs. the United States of America	Finalist	
2021	Megan Kate Nelson	The Three-Cornered War: The Union, the Confederacy, and Native Peoples in the Fight for the West	Finalist	
2022	Nicole Eustace	Covered with Night: A Story of Murder and Indigenous Justice in Early America	Winner	
2022	Ada Ferrer	Cuba: An American History	Winner	
2022	Kate Masur	Until Justice Be Done: America's First Civil Rights Movement, from the Revolution to Reconstruction	Finalist	
2023	Jefferson Cowie	Freedom's Dominion: A Saga of White Resistance to Federal Power	Winner	
2023	Garrett M. Graff	Watergate: A New History	Finalist	
2023	Michael John Witgen	Seeing Red: Indigenous Land, American Expansion, and the Political Economy of Plunder in North America	Finalist	
2024	Jacqueline Jones	No Right to an Honest Living: The Struggles of Boston's Black Workers in the Civil War Era	Winner	
2024	Elliott West	Continental Reckoning: The American West in the Age of Expansion	Finalist	
2024	Michael Willrich	American Anarchy: The Epic Struggle between Immigrant Radicals and the US Government at the Dawn of the Twentieth Century	Finalist	
2025	Kathleen DuVal	Native Nations: A Millennium in North America	Winner	
2025	Edda L. Fields-Black	Combee: Harriet Tubman, the Combahee River Raid, and Black Freedom during the Civil War	Winner	
2025	Seth Rockman	Plantation Goods: A Material History of American Slavery	Finalist	
2026	Jill Lepore	We the People: A History of the U.S. Constitution	Winner	
2026	Scott Anderson	King of Kings: The Iranian Revolution: A Story of Hubris, Delusion and Catastrophic Miscalculation	Finalist	
2026	Bench Ansfield	Born in Flames: The Business of Arson and the Remaking of the American City	Finalist	

== Repeat winners ==
Five people have won the Pulitzer Prize for History twice.

- Margaret Leech, 1942 for Reveille in Washington, 1860–1865 and 1960 for In the Days of McKinley
- Bernard Bailyn, 1968 for The Ideological Origins of the American Revolution and 1987 for Voyagers to the West: A Passage in the Peopling of America on the Eve of the Revolution
- Paul Horgan, 1955 for Great River: The Rio Grande in North American History and 1976 for Lamy of Santa Fe
- Alan Taylor, 1996 for William Cooper's Town: Power and Persuasion on the Frontier of the Early American Republic and 2014 for The Internal Enemy: Slavery and War in Virginia, 1772-1832
- Don E. Fehrenbacher completed The Impending Crisis by David Potter, for which Potter posthumously won the 1977 prize, and won the 1979 prize himself for The Dred Scott Case: Its Significance in American Law and Politics.

== See also ==
- List of history awards
