= 1925 Pulitzer Prize =

Awards for journalism and related fields

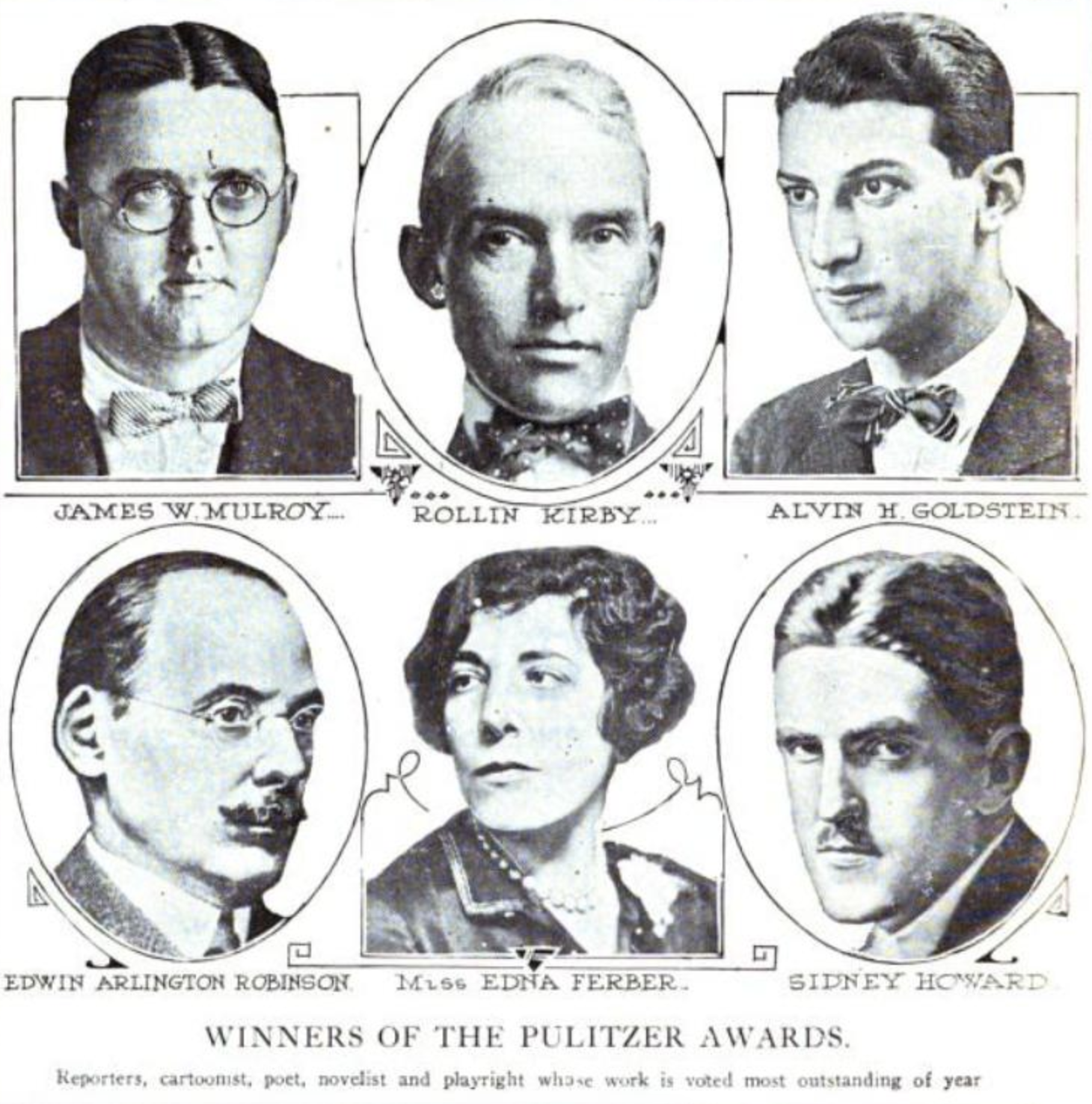
Portraits of several of the prize winners

The following are the Pulitzer Prizes for 1925.

== Journalism awards ==
- Reporting:
  - James W. Mulroy and Alvin H. Goldstein of the Chicago Daily News, for their service toward the solution of the murder of Robert Franks, Jr., in Chicago on May 22, 1924, and the bringing to justice of Nathan F. Leopold and Richard Loeb.
- Editorial Writing:
  - Robert Lathan of The News and Courier (Charleston, South Carolina), for the editorial entitled "The Plight of the South".

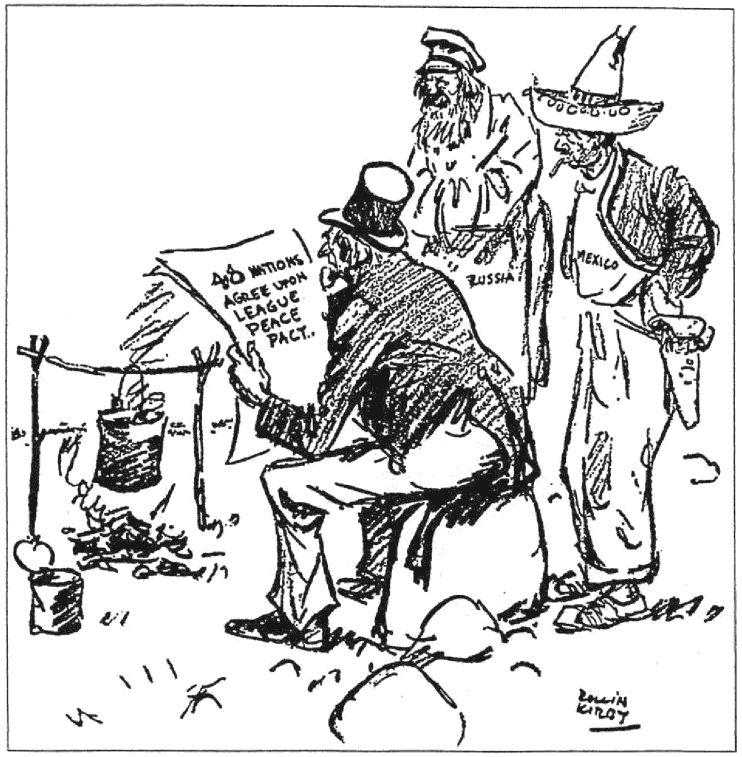
"News From the Outside World", recipient of the Prize for Editorial Cartooning

- Editorial Cartooning:
  - Rollin Kirby of the New York World for "News from the Outside World."

== Letters and Drama Awards ==
- Novel:
  - So Big by Edna Ferber (Doubleday)
- Drama:
  - They Knew What They Wanted by Sidney Howard (Doubleday)
- History:
  - History of the American Frontier by Frederic L. Paxson (Houghton)
- Biography or Autobiography:
  - Barrett Wendell and His Letters by M. A. Dewolfe Howe (Little)
- Poetry:
  - The Man Who Died Twice by Edwin Arlington Robinson (Macmillan)
