= The Republican Era, 1869–1901 =

Non-fiction book by Leonard D. White and Jean Schneider

- Author: Leonard D. White and Jean Schneider
- Language: English
- Genre: Non-fiction
- Publication place: United States
- Pages: 319

The Republican Era, 1869–1901 is a book by Leonard D. White and Jean Schneider. It won the 1959 Pulitzer Prize for History.
