= Between War and Peace =

Between War and Peace may refer to:

- Between War and Peace: The Potsdam Conference, a 1960 book by Herbert Feis
- Between War and Peace: Lessons from Afghanistan and Iraq, a 2004 book by Victor Davis Hanson

== See also ==
- War and Peace
