= In the Days of McKinley =

History book by Margaret Leech

- Author: Margaret Leech
- Language: English
- Genre: Non-fiction
- Publisher: Harper & Brothers Publishers
- Publication date: 1959
- Publication place: United States
- Pages: 686

In the Days of McKinley is a nonfiction history book by Margaret Leech published in 1959 by Harper & Brothers Publishers. It won the 1960 Pulitzer Prize for History. It is a biography of the former American President William McKinley.
