= Jean Schneider =

American historian

Jean Schneider is an American historian and winner of the Pulitzer Prize for History.

== Biography ==
Schneider was a graduate of Vassar College, graduating in 1921. She worked as the research assistant of Leonard D. White, a professor of public administration at the University of Chicago. The pair collaborated on the 1958 book The Republican Era, 1869–1901, but White died prior to its publication. They were awarded the Pulitzer Prize for History in 1959.
