= Jefferson Cowie =

American historian, author and academic

- Occupations: Historian, author and academic
- Title: James G. Stahlman Professor of History
- Awards: Francis Parkman Prize for the Best Book in American History, Society of American Historians; Merle Curti Award for Best Book in Social and/or Intellectual History, Organization of American Historians; Best Book Prize, Labor History; Best Book Prize, United Association for Labor Education; Philip Taft Prize for the Best Book in American Labor History; Choice Outstanding Academic Title; Pulitzer Prize for History

Academic background
- Education: B.A., History; Ph.D., History
- Alma mater: University of California, Berkeley; University of North Carolina

Academic work
- Institutions: Vanderbilt University; Cornell University
- Website: https://www.jeffersoncowie.info/

Jefferson Cowie is an American historian, author and an academic. He is a James G. Stahlman Professor of History and the Director of Economics and History Major at Vanderbilt University; a former fellow of Center for Advanced Studies in Behavioral Science at Stanford University; a fellow at the Society for Humanities at Cornell University, and at the Center for U.S.-Mexico Studies at UC San Diego.

Cowie's research focuses on the social and political history of how class, inequality, and labor affects American politics and culture. He has conducted research on labor history, U.S. social and political history, popular culture, democracy and inequality, popular movements and reform, American conservatism, and the history and ideas of social class since 1945 along with transnational and comparative labor and working-class history in the Americas. Cowie has authored various opinion pieces, essays, and journal articles. His books include Capital Moves: RCA's Seventy-Year Quest for Cheap Labor, Stayin' Alive: The 1970s and the Last Days of the Working Class, and The Great Exception: The New Deal and the Limits of American Politics. Cowie's work has received media recognition and an article in The Nation stated Cowie as "one our most commanding interpreters of recent American experience".

Cowie is a Distinguished Lecturer at Organization of American Historians.

== Education ==
Cowie received a Bachelor's degree in History from the University of California, Berkeley, in 1987, a Master's degree in History from the University of Washington, Seattle, in 1990, and a Ph.D. in History from the University of North Carolina, Chapel Hill, in 1997.

== Career ==
Following his doctoral studies, Cowie held a brief appointment at University of New Mexico before joining Cornell University's ILR School as a Visiting assistant professor of history in 1997. In 2001, he held an appointment as an assistant professor of history at Cornell University and in 2004, he was promoted to associate professor. Cowie was promoted to Professor of History in 2012 and held the position of Andrew J. Nathanson Family Professor at ILR School from 2013 till 2015. In 2016, Cowie left Cornell University and joined Vanderbilt University as James G. Stahlman Professor of History.

From 2008 till 2012, Cowie served as Inaugural House Professor and Dean of William Keeton House at Cornell University. He was chair of the Department of Labor Relations, Law, and History at the ILR School at Cornell University from 2013 to 2015.

== Research and books ==
Cowie's research focuses on American conservatism, race relations, popular culture, U.S. social and political history, democracy and inequality, popular movements and reform, history and ideas of social class since 1945 along with transnational and comparative labor and working-class history in the Americas.

=== Capital Moves: RCA's Seventy-Year Quest for Cheap Labor ===
Cowie published his book, Capital Moves: RCA's Seventy-Year Quest for Cheap Labor, in 1999. The book was reviewed as "original and timely" and an "important book written with a clear scholarly and political objective". The book revolves around economic upheaval and class conflict and the effects of capital mobility for industrial relations. Tim Strangleman stated that "Capital Moves weaves its narrative through notions of class, gender, race, and nationality as capital plays off the inequalities within and beyond the American labour market".

In a review, Federico Romero stated that "it does not take long to recognize an excellent book, and this is one". He further stated that "Cowie writes a complex story of capital migration, class formation, and social change." The book is also reviewed as "an important book that should be read by economists, historians, and indeed everyone interested in the making of modern world".

=== Stayin' Alive: The 1970s and the Last Days of the Working Class ===
Cowie's book, Stayin' Alive: The 1970s and the Last Days of the Working Class was published in 2010 and received various awards along with media recognition. Richard Oestreicher from the University of Pittsburgh stated that "the author poses big questions, imaginatively links material from what are usually separate topical specialties, and writes with considerable literary flair." According to Joseph A. McCartin, the book is "as smart and lively a history of American workers in this period as we will see for a long time". Robert Forrant reviewed that "while the book is long and may not work in some academic settings, anyone interested in understanding why, during our recent national elections, candidates from the major political parties almost never uttered the words "working class" would do well to read Cowie's lively history."

In 2011, Cowie received the Merle Curti Award and the Francis Parkman Prize for Stayin' Alive.

=== The Great Exception: The New Deal and the Limits of American Politics ===
Cowie's book, The Great Exception: The New Deal and the Limits of American Politics, which was published in 2016, is reviewed as "an engaging, thoughtful, provocative contribution" by American Politics, "one of the year's most important political books" by Washington Post; and as "a fresh, original look at a perennial historical conundrum" by Annals of Iowa.

Meg Jacobs stated that "Cowie's book has triggered a timely debate and will be essential reading for anyone interested in the American past and present". Another review stated the book as "slim, sweeping, and intentionally provocative volume", in which Cowie has asked the readers to "rethink one of the most deeply studied eras in American history: the New Deal".

=== Freedom's Dominion: A Saga of White Resistance to Federal Power ===
Cowie examines political interaction of white and black citizens in Barbour County, Alabama, home of politician George Wallace. He focuses on the issues of slavery and the "weaponization" of state means and actions to disenfranchise native and black persons, resist federal reconstruction efforts, destabilize elements of Roosevelt's New Deal and defer changes to civil rights imposed by the federal government. Cowie was awarded the 2023 Pulitzer Prize for history in recognition for this acclaimed work.

== Awards and honors ==
- 1995 - Foreign Language and Area Studies Fellowship, Universidad Nacional Autónoma de México
- 2000 - Excellence in Education Award, Labor and Employment Research Association
- 2000 - Philip Taft Prize for the Best Book Published in American Labor History for Capital Moves: RCA's 70-Year Quest for Cheap Labor
- 2004-2005 - Andrew W. Mellon Fellow, American Council of Learned Societies
- 2006-2007 - Fellow, Society for the Humanities, Cornell University
- 2011 - Choice Outstanding Academic Title for Stayin' Alive: The 1970s and the Last Days of the Working Class
- 2011 - Best Book Award for Stayin' Alive: The 1970s and the Last Days of the Working Class, United Association for Labor Education
- 2011 - Best Book Prize for Stayin' Alive: The 1970s and the Last Days of the Working Class, Labor History
- 2011 - Merle Curti Award for Best Book in Social and/or Intellectual History, Organization of American Historians
- 2011 - Francis Parkman Prize, for Stayin' Alive: The 1970s and the Last Days of the Working Class, Society of American Historians
- 2011 - Selected to Society of American Historians
- 2013-2015 - Nathanson Family Chair Professor, Cornell University
- 2015 - Distinguished Lecturer, Organization of American Historians
- 2019-2020 - Fellow, Center for Advanced Study in Behavior Sciences, Stanford University
- 2023 - Pulitzer Prize for History, for Freedom's Dominion: A Saga of White Resistance to Federal Power

== Bibliography ==
=== Books ===
- Capital Moves: RCA's Seventy-Year Quest for Cheap Labor (2001) ISBN 978-1-56584-659-3
- Stayin' Alive: The 1970s and the Last Days of the Working Class (2010) ISBN 978-1-59558-707-7
- The Great Exception: The New Deal and the Limits of American Politics (2016) ISBN 978-0-691-17573-7
- Freedom's Dominion: A Saga of White Resistance to Federal Power (2022) ISBN 978-1-5416-7280-2

=== Selected articles ===
- Cowie, J. (1996). National struggles in a transnational economy: A critical analysis of US labor's campaign against NAFTA. Lab. Stud. J., 21, 3.
- Cowie, J. (2002). Nixon's class struggle: Romancing the New Right worker, 1969–1973. Labor History, 43(3), 257–283.
- Cowie, J. (2004, October). From hard hats to the NASCAR dads. In New Labor Forum (Vol. 13, No. 3, p. 8). Sage Publications Ltd.
- Cowie, J., & Boehm, L. (2006). Dead man's town:" Born in the USA," social history, and working-class identity. American Quarterly, 58(2), 353–378.
- Cowie, J., & Salvatore, N. (2008). The long exception: Rethinking the place of the New Deal in American history. International Labor and Working-Class History, (74), 3-32.
- Cowie, J. (2019). Red History, Blue Mood: Labor History and Solidarity in an Age of Fragmentation, Labor: Studies in the Working-Class History of the Americas 16 (4), 35–47.
- Beito, David T. (2023, June). Fighting the Feds in the American South. Review of Freedom's Dominion in Reason Magazine, 64-65
