= Freedom's Dominion =

2022 book by Jefferson Cowie

Freedom's Dominion: A Saga of White Resistance to Federal Power
- Author: Jefferson Cowie
- Language: English
- Publisher: Basic Books
- Publication date: 2022
- Publication place: United States
- Pages: 512
- ISBN: 9781541672819

Freedom's Dominion: A Saga of White Resistance to Federal Power is a 2023 book by historian Jefferson Cowie, published by Basic Books. The book explains how White Americans embraced ideals of freedom and individual liberty while shunning perceived government interference as they dispossessed native peoples of their lands and resisted the federal government's racial justice interventions during reconstruction of the 1860s and '70s. This fervent antagonism towards the federal government continued into the 1950s and '60s, where many Whites viewed civil rights and anti-discrimination legislation as a threat to their individual freedoms. Cowie explores events in Barbour County, Alabama to explain these themes of individual freedom and racism.

The book was awarded the 2023 Pulitzer Prize for History.

== Narrative ==
The book documents how throughout American history, White citizens have often embraced the ideals of individual liberty and freedom from government interference as they committed racist acts towards other peoples. Cowie documents events in and around Barbour County Alabama as a microcosm of such sentiment. The book explains how during the early 1800s White settlers in Alabama engaged in the Alabama Fever land rushes, rapidly expanding westward and forcefully and violently dispossessing the Creek peoples and other Native tribes of their land. In 1832, the federal government, led by Andrew Jackson, deployed troops to the area in an attempt to stem the tide. But the White settlers continued their westward expansion in direct contravention of previous treaties with the Native peoples, with many settlers becoming folk heroes (such as Hardeman Owens) for their resistance to government restrictions.

Cowie then explains how Whites in the South resisted federal reconstruction era reforms aimed at integrating Blacks into American society as equals after the American Civil War. One vivid example provided was the Election Massacre of 1874 which took place in Eufala, Alabama, the largest town in Barbour County. During the massacre, a racist paramilitary group (The White League) murdered several Black Americans, injured many more and drove away more than a thousand from a polling station during the 1874 elections. Violence against Blacks was commonplace during the reconstruction era South and various white supremacist groups formed to resist government reforms. During reconstruction, the White ruling class also created nebulous laws against vagrancy, gambling or loitering and disproportionately utilized those laws to target newly freed Blacks. This led to many prisons around the country having majority Black populations, with the prisoners then commonly being leased out to do forced labor. Blacks made up 8% of the South's prison population in 1871, but by 1877 Blacks constituted 91% of the prison population.

Cowie then explains how this resistance against racial integration continued for the next 100 years, into the 1950s and 60s when George Wallace emerged as a national leader who advocated for segregation and viewed the federal government and civil rights reforms as intrusive government interference which inhibited individual liberty and freedoms. Wallace famously stated in his inaugural address: "Segregation now, segregation tomorrow, segregation forever" and his political career was characterized by staunch opposition to the Civil Rights Act of 1957 and 1964. Wallace eventually became a national hero for many who considered him to be a champion of individual liberty and freedom.

== Reception ==
Writing for The New York Times, historian Jeff Shesol stated that Cowe's "narrative is immersive; his characters are vividly rendered..." while also stating that the themes discussed in the book are still very much present in today's political and social landscape. The book was awarded the Pulitzer Prize in history in 2023, with the panel stating the work was "A riveting history of the long-running clash between white people and federal authority, this book radically shifts our understanding of what freedom means in America." Writing for The New Republic, Eric Herschthal stated that the narrative was presented in a vivid manner, with detailed and rich imagery, stating: "Rather than an intellectual history that charts an abstract idea across space and time, Cowie gives us a visceral, flesh-and-blood narrative rooted in a very specific place: Barbour County, Alabama." However Herschtahl criticized the work for overly focusing on the federal government as a driver for racial justice while neglecting grassroots civil rights organizations such as Black Communists, or the more moderate NAACP.
