= Journal of the Southwest =

Academic journal

- Discipline: Area studies
- Language: English
- Edited by: Joseph C. Wilder

Publication details
- Former names: Arizona and the West
- History: 1959–present
- Publisher: Southwest Center, University of Arizona (United States)
- Frequency: Quarterly

Standard abbreviations
- ISO 4: J. Southwest

Indexing
- ISSN: 0894-8410
- LCCN: 87643843
- JSTOR: 08948410
- OCLC no.: 15876763

Links
- Journal homepage

The Journal of the Southwest is a quarterly peer-reviewed academic journal published by the Southwest Center, at the University of Arizona, with a focus on the American Southwest and adjacent northwestern Mexico. The journal publishes scholarly research papers and reviews from across a range of academic fields in the humanities, including anthropology, folklore, literary studies, historiography, socio-political studies and aspects of the region's natural history.

As an area studies journal, the Journal of the Southwest is intended as an interdisciplinary research resource in the study of the region's peoples and cultures.

== History ==
The journal was initially established in 1959 by University of Arizona history professor John Alexander Carroll, under the name Arizona and the West. The focus of the quarterly was on the history of the entire region west of the Mississippi River. The first issue in Spring 1959 was dedicated to Frederick Jackson Turner whose Frontier Thesis argued the colonization of the American Frontier was the decisive factor in American democracy. The journal subsequently won Best Article awards from the Western History Association (WHA) and the Mormon History Association.

Carroll resigned as editor in 1963 when the University rejected his desire to move the journal to the WHA. Harwood P. Hinton, took over and remained editor until its final issue of volume 28 Winter 1986. The journal then moved out of the University's history department to the newly established Southwest Center in the College of Social and Behavioral Sciences of the University of Arizona. Beginning with the Spring 1987 issue, the journal's name was changed to the current Journal of the Southwest, with the volume numbering carried over under the new name and format. The journal's focus was changed from a primarily military and economic history of the entire American West to an interdisciplinary study of anthropology, sociology, geography and other study areas emphasizing the Southwest United States and Northern Mexico.
