= John Alexander Carroll =

American academic (died 2000)

John Alexander Carroll (died 17 December 2000) was an American academic between the 1950s to 1980s. During this time period, he primarily worked for the University of Arizona and Troy State University. While with Arizona, Carroll created Arizona and the West in 1959. He remained as the journal's editor until 1963.

Outside of academics, Carroll became a researcher for Douglas Southall Freeman's biography of George Washington in 1948. After Freeman died before he could complete his biography, Carroll and Mary Wells Ashworth co-wrote the 1957 book George Washington Volume VII: First in Peace. In 1958, Carroll was a co-winner for the 1958 Pulitzer Prize for Biography or Autobiography alongside Freeman and Ashworth.

== Education ==
Carroll went to Georgetown University to complete a program at the university's School of Foreign Service. He remained at Georgetown to earn a Doctor of Philosophy in 1956 with a specialty in American history.

== Career ==
Carroll began his career with the United States Navy during World War II. In 1941, he was one of the survivors of the USS California sinking at Pearl Harbor and later received a Purple Heart medal. When Douglas Southall Freeman started his 1948 biography on George Washington, Carroll worked for him as a researcher. In 1953, Freeman died before he could complete his Washington biography. To complete the biography on Washington, Carroll and Mary Wells Ashworth co-wrote George Washington Volume VII: First in Peace and released the book in 1957.

As an academic, Carroll began his career with the College of William and Mary. By the late 1950s, he had worked for Del Mar College in charge of history. He continued to work in the subject in 1958 when he became an associate professor with the University of Arizona. While at the university, Carroll created Arizona and the West in 1959, which was the successor of the Arizona Historical Review. He edited for the journal until 1963 when he resumed teaching at Arizona. Carroll remained at Arizona throughout the 1960s.

Apart from Arizona, Carroll was an academic for Texas Christian University in 1965. Between the mid-1970s to mid 1980s, Carroll continued his academic career with Troy State University. Outside of his teaching career, Carroll was a co-writer of Home of the Brave: A Patriot's Guide to American History in 1976. Additional works of Carroll's include Pioneering in Arizona and Reflections of Western Historians.

== Awards and honors ==
Carroll was a co-winner of the 1958 Pulitzer Prize for Biography or Autobiography alongside Freeman and Ashworth for their biography George Washington, Volumes I-VII.

== Death ==
Carroll died on 17 December 2000.
