= Earl S. Pomeroy =

American historian (1915–2005)

Earl Spencer Pomeroy (1915–2005) was an American historian whose work focused on the Western United States.

Pomeroy was born in Capitola, California. He received his B.A. from San Jose State College in 1936, and subsequently attended the University of California, Berkeley for graduate work, where he received his Ph.D. in 1940 under the direction of Frederic L. Paxson.

From 1942 to 1945, Pomeroy taught at the University of North Carolina, Chapel Hill. In 1945, he moved to Ohio State University, where he remained until 1949. In that year, he accepted a position at the University of Oregon, where he remained until 1976. He served as the Beekman Professor of History at Oregon. He served on the Department of the Army Historical Advisory Committee. In his time at Oregon, he oversaw 20 doctoral dissertations. One of his notable doctoral students was Peter Simpson.

In 1976 he accepted an appointment at the University of California, San Diego, where he remained until his retirement in 1986.

== Awards and Prizes ==
- 1942 Beveridge Prize from the American Historian Association (awarded to fund publication of The Territories and the United States)
- 1956 Guggenheim Fellowship for U.S. History
- 1971 President, Pacific Coast Branch, American Historical Association
- 1993 President, Western Historical Association

== Bibliography ==
- "Carpet‐baggers in the Territories 1861 to 1890." The Historian 2.1 (1939): 53–64.
- "Lincoln, the Thirteenth Amendment, and the Admission of Nevada." Pacific Historical Review 12.4 (1943): 362–368. online
- "The territory as a frontier institution." The Historian 7.1 (1944): 29–41.
- "The American colonial office." Mississippi Valley Historical Review 30.4 (1944): 521–532. online
- The Territories and the United States, 1861–1890: Studies in Colonial Administration (1947)
- "American Policy Respecting the Marshalls, Carolines, and Marianas, 1898-1941." Pacific Historical Review 17.1 (1948): 43–53. online
- Pacific Outpost: Guam and Micronesia in American Strategy (1951)
- "Frederic L. Paxson and His Approach to History." Mississippi Valley Historical Review 39.4 (1953): 673–692. online
- "Toward a Reorientation of Western History: Continuity and Environment," in the Mississippi Valley Historical Review 41 (March 1955) online
- In Search of the Golden West: The Tourist in Western America (1957)
- "Old Lamps for New: The Cultural Lag in Pacific Coast Historiography." Arizona and the West 2.2 (1960): 107–126. online
- "Rediscovering the West." American Quarterly 12.1 (1960): 20–30.
- "The Changing West," in John Higham, ed., The Reconstruction of American History (1962)
- "Josiah Royce, Historian in Quest of Community." Pacific Historical Review 40.1 (1971): 1-20. online
- Pomeroy, Earl (2003). The Pacific Slope: A History Of California, Oregon, Washington, Idaho, Utah, And Nevada (New edition (2003) ed.). University of Nevada Press. ISBN 978-0874175189.
- American Far West in the Twentieth Century (2008) online
