= Reveille in Washington, 1860–1865 =

History book by Margaret Leech

- Title page for Reveille in Washington, 1860–1865 (1941)
- Author: Margaret Leech
- Language: English
- Genre: Non-fiction
- Publisher: Harper, NYRB
- Publication date: 1941
- Publication place: United States
- Pages: 524

Reveille in Washington, 1860–1865 is a nonfiction history book by American historian Margaret Leech. It won the 1942 Pulitzer Prize for History. After being out of print for years, it was reissued by New York Review Books in 2011 with an introduction by James M. McPherson, author of the Pulitzer Prize-winning book Battle Cry of Freedom (1988).

== Contents ==
Reveille in Washington focuses on the everyday politics and preoccupations of Washington during the American Civil War. From the stench of corpse-littered streets to the plunging lace on Mary Todd Lincoln’s evening gowns, Leech illuminates the city and its familiar figures such as Abraham Lincoln, Jefferson Davis, Robert E. Lee, William Seward, and Mary Surratt.

== Reception ==
The book was critically acclaimed. The Washington Post said that the book "remains the best single popular account of Washington during the great convulsion of the Civil War" and that it was "vividly written, with hundreds of cameo portraits, from President Lincoln to the humblest citizen." The New Republic expressed that Leech "offers a smart and witty account of wartime Washington's transformation from an administrative backwater to the locus of renewed federal power" and called the book an "encyclopedic portrait" and a "first-rate chronicle of how the political elites handled the war".

== Awards ==
Reveille in Washington received the Pulitzer Prize for History in 1942 and Leech became the first woman to win that prize.
