= Goddess of Anarchy =

2017 biography of Lucy Parsons by Jacqueline Jones

- Author: Jacqueline Jones
- Subject: Biography
- Published: December 2017 (Basic Books)
- Pages: 480
- ISBN: 978-0-465-07899-8 (Hardcover)

Goddess of Anarchy: The Life and Times of Lucy Parsons, American Radical is a biography of Lucy Parsons written by Jacqueline Jones and published by Basic Books in December 2017.

== Reception ==
The book was generally well received. Kirkus Reviews says the biography was "comprehensive and fair, though a little more warmth toward Parsons would have made the book more engaging." Jones admitted in an interview with the New York Times that she wanted to portray a more nuanced image of Parsons than her previous biographer, Carolyn Ashbaugh, who wrote more positively about Parsons.
