= History of the American Frontier =

History book by Frederic L. Paxson

- 2001 reprint
- Author: Frederic L. Paxson
- Cover artist: Currier and Ives, The Rocky Mountains: Emigrants Crossing the Plains, 1866 lithograph
- Language: English
- Genre: Non-fiction
- Publisher: Houghton Mifflin (1924); Simon Publications (2001 reprint)
- Publication place: United States
- Pages: 628

History of the American Frontier is a history book by Frederic L. Paxson, originally published in 1924 by Houghton Mifflin. It won the Pulitzer Prize for History in 1925.
