= The Atlantic Migration, 1607–1860 =

History book by Marcus Lee Hansen

The Atlantic Migration, 1607–1860: A History of the Continuing Settlement of the United States
- Title page for The Atlantic Migration, 1607–1860: A History of the Continuing Settlement of the United States (1945)
- Editor: Arthur M. Schlesinger, Sr.
- Author: Marcus Lee Hansen
- Language: English
- Genre: History
- Publisher: Harvard University Press
- Publication date: 1940
- Publication place: United States

The Atlantic Migration, 1607–1860: A History of the Continuing Settlement of the United States is a nonfiction history book by American historian Marcus Lee Hansen (1892-1938). The book covers the social and economic background of emigrant groups to the United States from colonial days to the American Civil War.

The book was published after the death of Hansen. Historian Arthur M. Schlesinger, Sr. turned the rough draft developed by Hansen into a polished manuscript. The book was published by the Harvard University Press in 1940. The book won the 1941 Pulitzer Prize for History.
