= Claude H. Van Tyne =

American historian

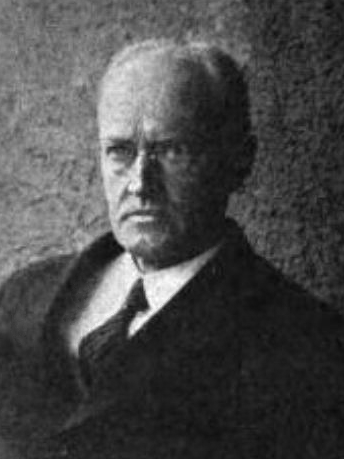
- Claude H. Van Tyne c. 1925
- Born: 16 October 1869; Tecumseh, Michigan, U.S.
- Died: 21 March 1930 (aged 60); Ann Arbor, Michigan, U.S.
- Education: University of Michigan (BA); University of Pennsylvania (PhD)
- Spouse: Belle Josling
- Children: 4
- Scientific career
- Fields: American History
- Workplaces: University of Michigan; University of Pennsylvania

Claude Halstead Van Tyne (October 16, 1869 – March 21, 1930) was an American historian. He was a senior fellow at the University of Pennsylvania in 1902. He taught history at the University of Michigan from 1903 to 1930 and wrote several books on the American Revolution. He won the Pulitzer Prize for The War of Independence in 1930.

== Biography ==
Van Tyne was born in Tecumseh, Michigan, to Lawrence H. and Helena van Tyne. He started his career in banking, and ascended to the cashier position. He left his banking career, and went to the University of Michigan to pursue his higher studies. He finished a B.A. degree in 1896. From 1897–1898, he studied in Leipzig, Heidelberg, and Paris. He went back to the U.S., and finished a PhD degree at the University of Pennsylvania. He was a senior fellow at the University of Pennsylvania for few years, before joining the University of Michigan as an assistant professor of history in 1903. He became professor in 1906 and head of the history department in 1911. He taught history at Michigan and chaired the department until his death in 1930. He lectured in the French provincial universities in 1913–1914.

He married Belle Josling in 1896; they went on to have three sons, and one daughter.

He died at his home in Ann Arbor, Michigan on March 21, 1930, after a long illness.

== Publications and the Pulitzer Prize ==
Van Tyne wrote several books on the American Revolution including The Loyalists in the American Revolution (1902), The Causes of the War of Independence (1922), England & America: Rivals in the American Revolution (1927), and The War of Independence (1929). He also wrote Guide to the Archives of the Government of the United States in Washington (coauthor: Waldo G. Leland; 1904), A History of the United States for Schools (co-author Andrew C. McLaughlin, 1911) and India in Ferment (1923). He won the annual Pulitzer Prize for History in 1930 for The War of Independence.
