= Westbourne (Richmond, Virginia) =

Historic house in Virginia, United States

- U.S. National Register of Historic Places
- Virginia Landmarks Register
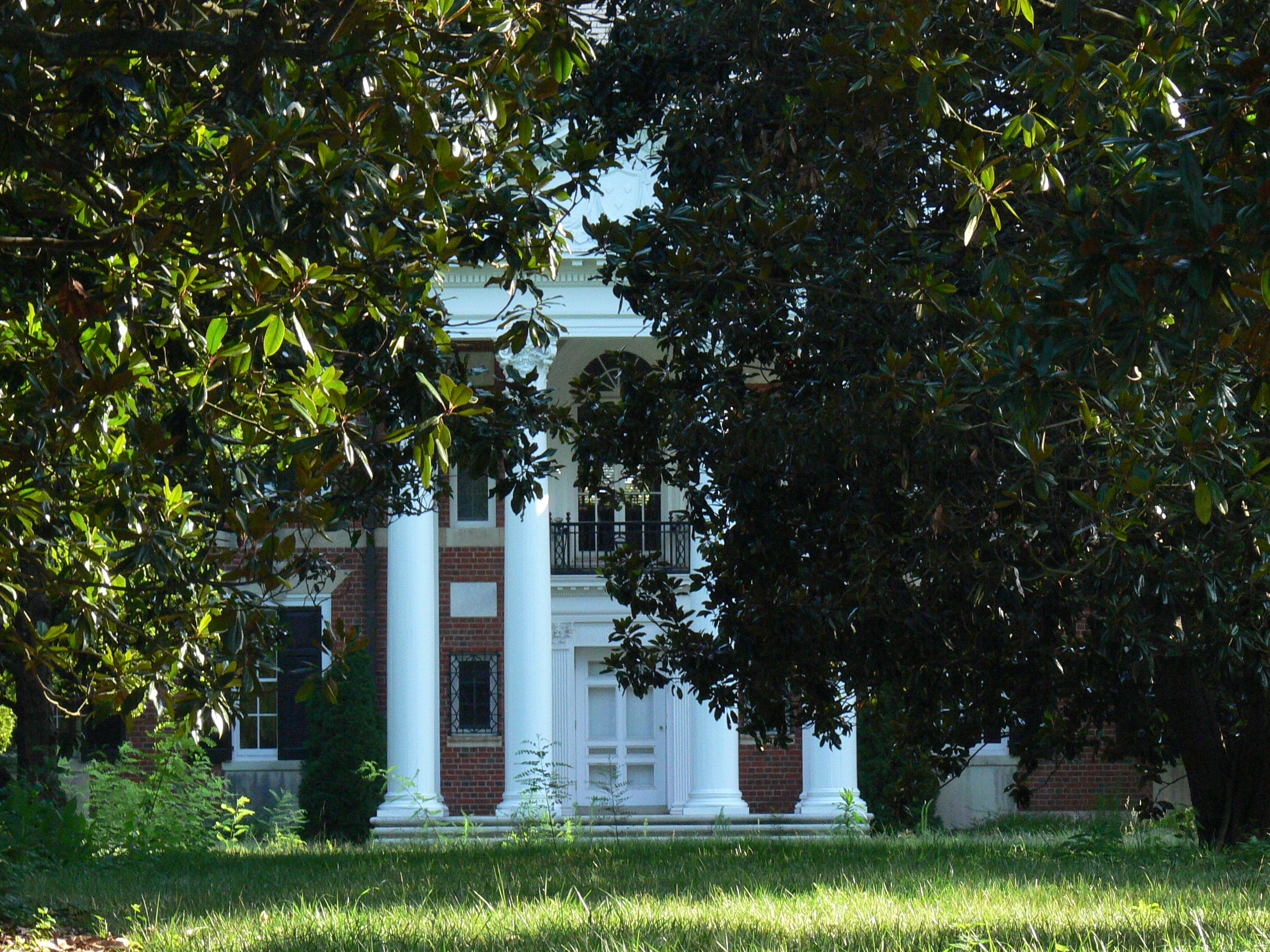
- Westbourne, September 2011

- Location within Virginia Location within the United States
- Location: 330 Oak Ln., Richmond, Virginia
- Coordinates: 37°34′25″N 77°30′27″W
- Area: 2 acres (0.81 ha)
- Built: 1919
- Architects: Lee, W. Duncan; Gillette, Charles F.
- Architectural style: Georgian Revival
- NRHP reference No.: 99001721
- VLR No.: 127-5822

Significant dates
- Added to NRHP: January 27, 2000
- Designated VLR: September 15, 1999

Westbourne, also known as Pinehurst, is a historic home located in Richmond, Virginia. It was designed by architect W. Duncan Lee in 1915, and built in 1919. It is a 2 1/2-story, Georgian Revival style brick dwelling consisting of a symmetrical central block flanked by two-story brick wings and covered with a hipped slate roof. It features a tetrastyle Corinthian order portico that occupies the center bays of the north elevation. The property includes extensive gardens designed by noted landscape architect Charles F. Gillette. The house was originally built for Abram L. McClellan a wealthy business man and real estate developer.

The house was originally named “Pinehurst” but was renamed “Westbourne” in 1938 by the second owner, Dr. Douglas Southall Freeman, a Pulitzer Prize-winning author and biographer and onetime editor of the former Richmond News Leader. Freeman hired Virginia landscape architect, Charles F. Gillette, to design the grounds, however the gardens no longer exist as much of the property has since been subdivided.

It was listed on the National Register of Historic Places in 2000.
