= The Life of the Mind in America =

History book by Perry Miller

The Life of the Mind in America: From the Revolution to the Civil War
- Author: Perry Miller
- Language: English
- Genre: Non-fiction
- Publisher: Harcourt, Brace & World
- Publication date: 1965
- Publication place: United States

The Life of the Mind in America: From the Revolution to the Civil War is a non-fiction history book by Perry Miller. It won the 1966 Pulitzer Prize for History. Miller writing about "Evangelical Basis" (Book one), "The Legal Mentality" (Book two), "Science" (Book three). Book three was incomplete. The Life of the Mind was published posthumously.

The Evangelical Basis has generated the most influence. The Legal Mentality has been relatively neglected. The sublime is present through the book. The introduction was “The Sublime of American.” Unfortunately, that was not written, because Miller was deceased before the book published. Nature against law and the law's independence are especially relevant of the second book.
