= Marcus Lee Hansen =

American historian (1892–1938)

- Born: December 8, 1892; Neenah, Wisconsin, U.S.
- Died: May 11, 1938 (aged 45); Redlands, California, U.S.
- Education: Central College (BA); University of Iowa (MA); Harvard University (PhD)
- Occupation: Historian
- Awards: Pulitzer Prize for History (1941)

Marcus Lee Hansen (December 8, 1892 – May 11, 1938) was an American historian, who won the 1941 Pulitzer Prize for History for The Atlantic Migration, 1607–1860 (1940).

== Biography ==
Hansen was born in Neenah, Wisconsin. He was one of eight children born to Danish immigrant Marcus Hansen and Norwegian immigrant Gina O Lee Hansen. He received a BA from Central College, an MA from the University of Iowa, and a PhD from Harvard University, where he studied under Frederick Jackson Turner. He was associate professor of history (1928–1930) and Professor of History (1930–1938) at the University of Illinois at Urbana-Champaign.

Hansen was a member of the Board of Editors of the Norwegian-American Historical Association. He conducted research on the history of immigration to the United States. After winning a two-year grant, he studied migration records in Europe for several years. He died on May 11, 1938, at the age of 45 in Redlands, California, of chronic nephritis.

== Work and publications ==
Hansen was an important historian of American immigration. In a 1938 essay, "The Problem of the Third Generation Immigrant", he first presented what he called "the principle of third generation interest": "What the son wishes to forget the grandson wishes to remember". This hypothesis suggests that ethnicity is preserved among immigrants, weakens among their children, and returns with their grandchildren. Children of immigrants tend to reject the foreign ways of their parents, including their religion, and want to join the American mainstream, but the next generation wants to retain the values of their ancestors. The religion of the first generation immigrant, which the second generation rejects, may be reaffirmed by the third generation. Hansen's hypothesis, which became popularized as "Hansen's law", led to much research. Most has shown that although the third generation retains some ethnic identity, there is not a return to ancestral cultural practices among later generations.

Hansen's most well-known works were The Atlantic Migration, 1607–1860: A History of the Continuing Settlement of the United States (posthumous, 1940) and The Immigrant in American History (posthumous, 1940). The former was a study of the factors that encouraged emigration among Europeans in the period before the Civil War, and was based on three years of research in European archives.

Although he specialized in American immigration history, he wrote on other subjects, including Old Fort Snelling, 1819–1858 (1918), Welfare Campaigns in Iowa (1920), Welfare Work in Iowa (1921), and The Mingling of the Canadian and American Peoples (posthumous, 1940).

== Recognition ==
Hansen was posthumously awarded the 1941 Pulitzer Prize for History for The Atlantic Migration, 1607–1860: A History of the Continuing Settlement of the United States, which was published in 1940 by Harvard University Press after historian Arthur M. Schlesinger, Sr. turned his rough draft into a polished manuscript.

== Bibliography ==
- Hall, Max (1986). Harvard University Press: A History. Cambridge, MA: Harvard University Press. ISBN 0-674-38080-0.
- Brennan, Elizabeth A.; Elizabeth C. Clarage (1999). Who's Who of Pulitzer Prize Winners. (Westport, CT: Greenwood Publishing). ISBN 1-57356-111-8.
- Kugelmass, Jack (2003). Key Texts in American Jewish Culture. Piscataway, NJ: Rutgers University Press. ISBN 0-8135-3221-3.
