= The War of Independence =

History book by Claude H. Van Tyne

The War of Independence: American Phase: Being the Second Volume of a History of the Founding of the American Republic
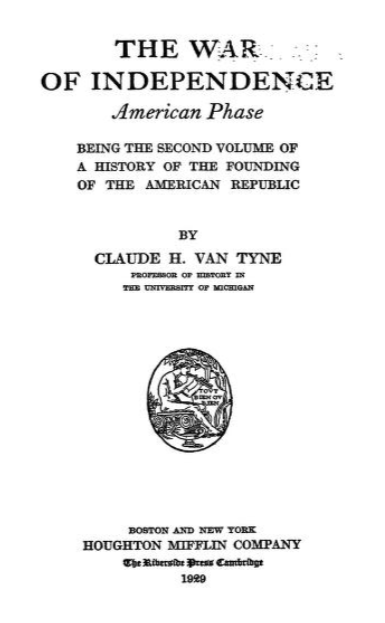
- Title page for The War of Independence (1929)
- Author: Claude H. Van Tyne
- Language: English
- Subject: American Revolutionary War
- Genre: Non-fiction
- Publication date: 1929
- Publication place: United States

The War of Independence: American Phase: Being the Second Volume of a History of the Founding of the American Republic is a nonfiction history book by American historian Claude H. Van Tyne, published in 1929. It explains the history and causes of the American Revolutionary War. Van Tyne won the Pulitzer Prize for History for this book in 1930.

It is the second in a short series. The first volume was published in 1922, The Causes Of The War Of Independence.
