= Mary Wells Ashworth =

American historian (1903–1992)

- Born: Mary Wells Knight Ashworth; May 28, 1903; Plant City, Florida, U.S.
- Died: September 12, 1992 (aged 89); Richmond, Virginia, U.S.
- Occupations: Historian, writer
- Writing career
- Notable awards: 1954 Guggenheim Fellowship; 1958 Pulitzer Prize for Biography or Autobiography for George Washington, Volumes I-VII

Mary Wells Knight Ashworth (May 28, 1903 – September 12, 1992) was an American historian who wrote for Douglas Southall Freeman between 1945 and 1953. With Freeman, Ashworth worked on his seven volume biography on George Washington. After Freeman died before his biography was completed, Ashworth continued completing the biography as a member of Charles Scribner's Sons from 1954 to 1957.

With the George Washington biography, Ashworth was a bibliographer before she co-wrote the seventh volume with John Alexander Carroll. Apart from Washington, Ashworth's entries appeared in Notable American Women 1607-1950 and the World Book Encyclopedia. Between the late 1950s and late 1960s, Ashworth held executive positions for the English-Speaking Union and Hollins College. She was granted a Guggenheim Fellowship for biography in 1955 and was a co-winner of the 1958 Pulitzer Prize for Biography or Autobiography with George Washington, Volumes I-VII.

== Biography ==
Ashworth was born in Plant City, Florida on May 28, 1903. She went to Virginia to complete a Bachelor of Arts at Hollins College in 1924.

From 1945 to 1953, Ashworth worked as a historian for Douglas Southall Freeman while he wrote his biography George Washington. Throughout her time on Freeman's biography, Ashworth was initially a bibliographer for the seven volume Washington biography. When Freeman died after writing Volume VI of his biography, Ashworth continued working on the Washington biography with Charles Scribner's Sons from 1954 to 1957.

For the final volumes of the Washington biography, Ashworth was involved in the publication stages of Volume VI and co-wrote Volume VII alongside John Alexander Carroll. George Washington, Volume VII was Ashworth's first and only book as an author.

Apart from writing, Ashworth's entries were featured in Notable American Women 1607-1950 and the World Book Encyclopedia. From 1957 to 1967, Ashworth held multiple executive roles for organizations in Virginia. These included the English-Speaking Union and the Richmond Woman's Club. With Hollins College, Ashworth worked as a trustee from the early 1960s to late 1960s. On September 12, 1992, Ashworth died of an aortic rupture in Richmond, Virginia, aged 89. She was married with two children.

== Awards and honors ==
In 1954, Ashworth was awarded a Guggenheim Fellowship in biography. In 1958, she was a co-winner of the Pulitzer Prize for Biography or Autobiography for George Washington, Volumes I-VII.
