= The Road to Reunion, 1865–1900 =

History book by Paul Herman Buck

- Title page for The Road to Reunion, 1865–1900 (1937)
- Author: Paul Herman Buck
- Language: English
- Genre: Non-fiction
- Publication date: 1937
- Publication place: United States

The Road to Reunion, 1865–1900 is a nonfiction history book by Paul Herman Buck. It won the 1938 Pulitzer Prize for History.
