= Fred Albert Shannon =

American historian

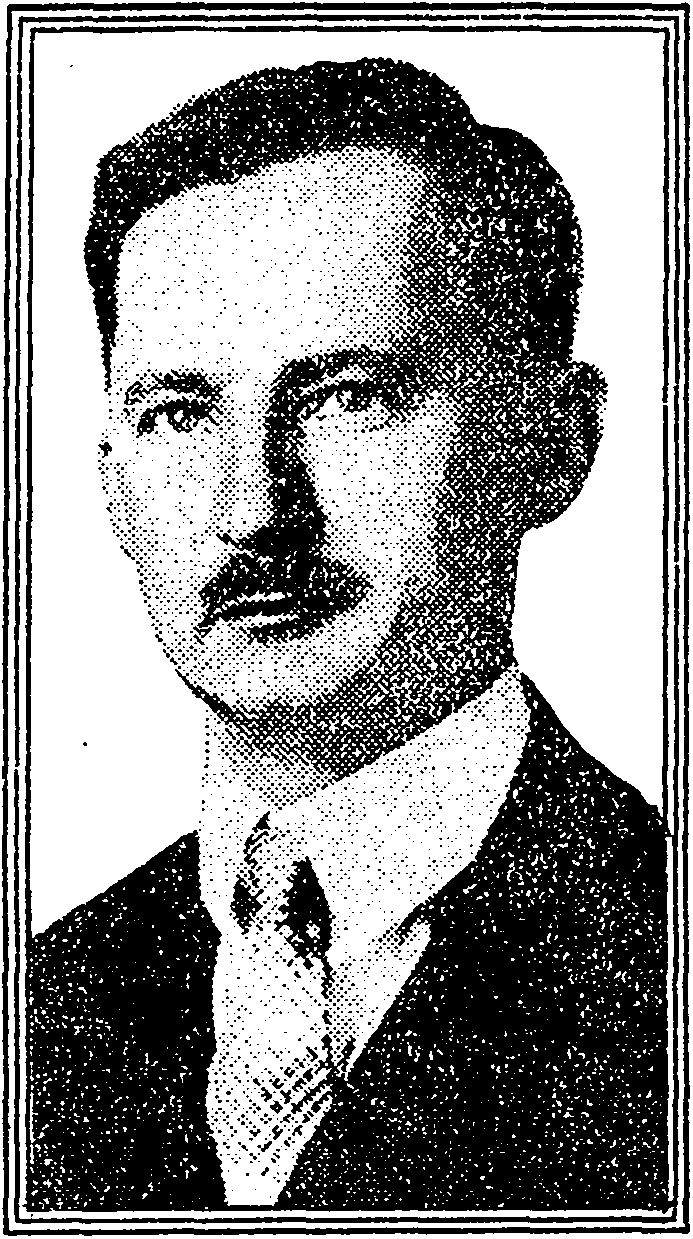
- Shannon in 1929
- Born: February 12, 1893; Sedalia, Missouri, U.S.
- Died: 4 June 1963 (aged 70)
- Resting place: Mount Hope Cemetery, Urbana, Illinois

Fred Albert Shannon (February 12, 1893 – February 4, 1963) was an American historian. He had many publications related to American history, and he won the 1929 Pulitzer Prize for History for The Organization and Administration of the Union Army, 1861-1865 (1928).

== Early life ==
He was born February 12, 1893, in Sedalia, Missouri, the son of Louis Tecumseh Shannon and Sarah Margaret (Sparks) Shannon. By 1900, his family was living in Harrison Township, Clay County, Indiana. He completed a Bachelor of Arts degree at the Indiana State Teachers College and an Master of Arts degree at Indiana University in 1918.

== Career ==
He worked as a school teacher and then became professor of history at Iowa Wesleyan College in 1919. Five years later, he completed a Ph.D. degree at the University of Iowa and became assistant professor of history at the Iowa State Teachers College.

In 1926, he moved to the Kansas State College of Agriculture and Applied Science, where he was associate professor of history for several years. Meanwhile, he also taught at Cornell College (1924) and Ohio State University (1929) in the summer session. From 1939 to 1961, he was professor of history at the University of Illinois and served many years as chairman of its history department.

He was a member of the American Historical Association and was on the executive committee of the Mississippi Valley Historical Association.

== Personal life ==
He was married to Edna M. (Jones) Shannon (born November 10, 1891, and died January 2, 1953). They had five children: Lucile, Mary, Edna, Marjory and herpetologist Frederick A. Shannon, M.D.

== Death ==
He died on February 4, 1963, just after beginning a semester as a visiting professor at the University of South Carolina. He was buried with his wife in Mount Hope Cemetery, Urbana, Illinois.

== Work ==
Shannon edited various publications and contributed to professional journals. He wrote history from the perspective of average Americans, whose values he believed had shaped the United States. He had low regard for wealthy Americans.

In 1928, Shannon wrote a two-volume book The Organization and Administration of the Union Army, 1861-1865, which covered the history of the Union Army. He won the Pulitzer Prize for History for the book in 1929. He also was an editor and contributor to the Holt, Rinehart and Winston series The Economic History of the United States.

Since his death, some of Shannon's writing on Southern slavery has been criticized as being racist. In fact, Shannon's own description of southern agriculture after the Civil War was strongly critical of the exploitation of black sharecroppers by white landowners.

== Selected bibliography ==
- The Organization and Administration of the Union Army, 1861-1865 (1928)
- The Farmer’s Last Frontier: Agriculture, 1860-1897 (1945, reprinted in 1968 online
- American Farmers’ Movements (1957)
- The Centennial Years: A Political and Economic History of America from Late 1870s to the Early 1890s (1967)

== Sources ==
- Fischer, Heinz Dietrich; Erika J. Fischer (1994). American History Awards, 1917-1991: From Colonial Settlements to the Civil Rights Movement. Walter de Gruyter. ISBN 3-598-30177-4.
- Brennan, Elizabeth A.; Elizabeth C. Clarage (1999). Who's who of Pulitzer Prize Winners. Greenwood Publishing Group. ISBN 1-57356-111-8.
