= Douglas Southall Freeman =

American historian & journalist (1886–1953)

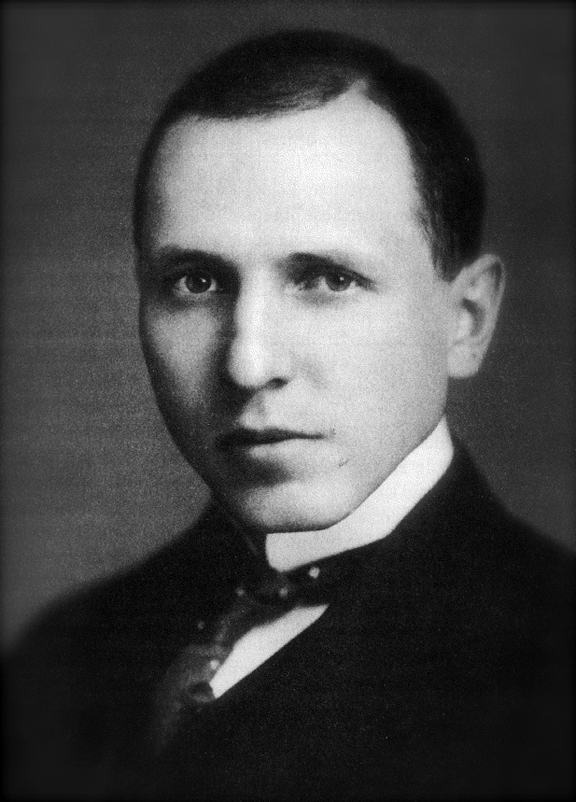
- Douglas Southall Freeman, c. 1916
- Born: May 16, 1886; Lynchburg, Virginia, U.S.
- Died: June 13, 1953 (aged 67); Richmond, Virginia, U.S.
- Education: Richmond College (AB); Johns Hopkins University (PhD)
- Occupations: Historian; Biographer; Newspaper editor Author
- Spouse: Inez Virginia Goddin
- Children: Mary Tyler Freeman; Anne Ballard Freeman; James Douglas Freeman

Douglas Southall Freeman (May 16, 1886 – June 13, 1953) was an American historian, biographer, newspaper editor, radio commentator, and author. He is best known for his multi-volume biographies of Robert E. Lee and George Washington, for both of which he was awarded Pulitzer Prizes.

== Early life ==
Douglas Southall Freeman was born May 16, 1886, in Lynchburg, Virginia, to Bettie Allen Hamner and Walker Burford Freeman, an insurance agent who had served four years in Robert E. Lee's Army of Northern Virginia. From childhood, Freeman exhibited an interest in Southern history. In Lynchburg, his family lived at 416 Main Street, near the home of Confederate general Jubal Early. The family moved to the former Confederate capital of Richmond, Virginia, in 1892 at the height of the monument commemoration movement that memorialized Virginia's Robert E. Lee, J.E.B. Stuart, and Thomas "Stonewall" Jackson.

In 1904, Freeman was awarded an A.B. from Richmond College, where he had been a member of the Phi Gamma Delta fraternity. In 1908, at the age of 22, he earned a Ph.D. in history from Johns Hopkins University in Baltimore. Unable to secure a position in academia, Freeman joined the staff of the Richmond Times-Dispatch in 1909, and, in 1915, at the age of 29, he became editor of The Richmond News Leader—a position he held for 34 years.

== Writing career ==
=== Lee's Dispatches ===
In 1911, when Freeman was 25 years old, he came into possession of a cache of long-lost wartime communications between Robert E. Lee and Confederate president Jefferson Davis. Freeman spent four years working on the documents, and in 1915, he published Lee's Dispatches. The book was received enthusiastically by Civil War historians, and it became an important primary source for Civil War scholars.

Written between June 2, 1862, and April 1, 1865, Lee's letters to Davis revealed the general's strategy with clearer perspective, shed new light on some of Lee's decisions, and underscored his close and always co-operative relationship with Davis. In his Introduction, Freeman summarized seven major revelations contained in the letters. For example, the letters reveal that the Confederate high command in 1862 considered but rejected a bold proposal to strengthen Stonewall Jackson's army in the Shenandoah Valley and embark on a vigorous offensive campaign against the North, even at the expense of defending Richmond.

=== R. E. Lee: A Biography ===
Following the immediate critical success of Lee's Dispatches, Freeman was approached by New York publisher Charles Scribner's Sons and invited to write a biography of Robert E. Lee. Freeman accepted but chose to retain his position at The Richmond News Leader and work longer days to work on the biography.

Freeman's research of Lee was exhaustive. He was able to interview some survivors of Lee's army, such as Giles Buckner Cooke. He evaluated and cataloged every item about Lee, and he reviewed records at West Point and the War Department and material in private collections. In narrating the general's Civil War years, he used what came to be known as the "fog of war" technique, providing readers only the limited information that Lee himself had at a given moment. That helped convey the confusion of war that Lee experienced as well as the processes by which Lee grappled with problems and made decisions.

R. E. Lee: A Biography was published in four volumes in 1934 and 1935. In its book review, The New York Times declared it "Lee complete for all time." Historian Dumas Malone wrote, "Great as my personal expectations were, the realization far surpassed them." In 1935, Freeman was awarded the Pulitzer Prize for his four-volume biography.

Freeman's R. E. Lee: A Biography established the Virginia School of Civil War scholarship, an approach to writing Civil War history that concentrated on the Eastern Theater of the war, focused the narrative on generals over the common soldier, centered the analysis on military campaigns over social and political events, and treated his Confederate subjects with sympathy. This approach to writing Civil War history would lead some critics to label Freeman a "Lost Cause" historian, a pejorative reference to a pseudohistorical apologist interpretation of the cause of the Civil War that deprecates the central role of slavery. Freeman began work on his biography of Lee in 1926; by the time he had completed his four volume work in 1933, he had committed some 6,100 hours to the effort.

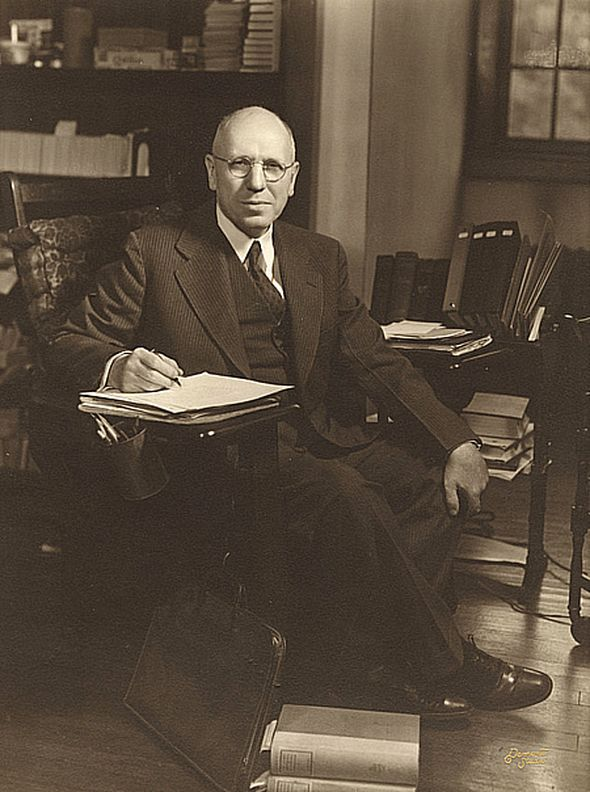
Freeman in his latter years

=== Lee's Lieutenants: A Study in Command ===
Following the critical success of R. E. Lee: A Biography, Freeman expanded his study of the Confederacy with the three-volume Lee's Lieutenants: A Study in Command, published in 1942, 1943, and 1944. It presents a unique combination of military strategy, biography, and Civil War history, and it shows how armies actually work. Published during World War II, it had a great influence on American military leaders and strategists. A few months after the conclusion of the war, Freeman was asked to join an official tour of American forces in Europe and Japan. Lee's Lieutenants: A Study in Command established Freeman as the preeminent military historian in the country, and led to close friendships with United States generals George C. Marshall and Dwight D. Eisenhower.

=== Biography of George Washington ===
After completing his exhaustive studies of Lee, his generals, and the Confederate war effort, Freeman started work on a seven-volume biography of George Washington. Applying the same approach of exhaustive research and writing narrative based on objective fact, Freeman completed the first two volumes, titled Young Washington, in 1948. The following year, he retired from journalism in order to complete his monumental work on Washington.

George Washington Volume 3: Planter and Patriot and George Washington Volume 4: Leader of the Revolution were published in 1951. The following year, he published George Washington Volume 5: Victory with the Help of France (1952). Freeman completed work on George Washington Volume 6: Patriot and President just before he died; it was published after his death in 1954. The concluding book, George Washington Volume 7: First in Peace, was written by Freeman's associates, John Alexander Carroll and Mary Wells Ashworth, based on Freeman's original research and was published in 1957. Historian and George Washington biographer John E. Ferling maintains that no other biography of Washington compares to that of Freeman's work.

== Newspaper, radio, and teaching careers ==
Freeman's considerable literary achievements have overshadowed his career as editor of The Richmond News Leader. Between 1915 and 1949, he wrote an estimated 600,000 words of editorial copy every year. He earned a national reputation among military scholars for his analyses of operations during World War I and World War II. His editorials expressed a moderate approach to race relations, and in his editorials opposed the Byrd Organization—a powerful statewide Democratic political machine run by United States Senator Harry F. Byrd.

Freeman retired as editor of The Richmond News Leader on June 25, 1949. Years later, his obituary published in his former newspaper captured the scope of his editorial interests.

He must have written close to 600,000 words a year, campaigned for the Federal Reserve Act, for abolition of the old City Administration Board, for repeal of the fee system, for establishment of the battlefield parks, for Richmond's new charter ... Among the legacies he left to us here on the paper were his "Seventy Rules for Good Writing" ... he put brevity just behind accuracy in his list of virtues.

In addition to his forty-year career in journalism, Freeman became one of the first radio analysts, in 1925. His twice-daily radio broadcasts helped make him one of the most influential men in Virginia. From 1934 to 1941, he commuted weekly by air to New York City to teach journalism at Columbia University. He also taught as a lecturer at the United States Army War College for seven years, and served as Rector of the University of Richmond.

== Personal life ==
Freeman's work ethic was legendary. Throughout his life, he kept a demanding schedule that allowed him to accomplish a great deal in his two full-time careers, as a journalist and as a historian. When at home, he rose at three every morning and drove to his newspaper office, saluting Robert E. Lee's monument on Monument Avenue as he passed. Twice daily, he walked to a nearby radio studio, where he gave news broadcasts and discussed the day's news. After his second broadcast, he would drive home for a short nap and lunch and then worked another five or six hours on his current historical project, with classical music, frequently the work of Joseph Haydn, playing in the background.

Freeman was a devout Baptist who prayed daily in the small chapel he built in his home. He acknowledged that his Christian faith played a central role throughout his life. Freeman was also a Virginian, and described himself as "deeply rooted in the soil of old Virginia." He believed in the importance of continuity, even in personal geography, once writing, "I think the American people lose a large part of the joy of life because they do not live for generations in the same place."

Freeman believed in the importance of a character. His definition of leadership was, "Know your stuff, be a man, look after your men."

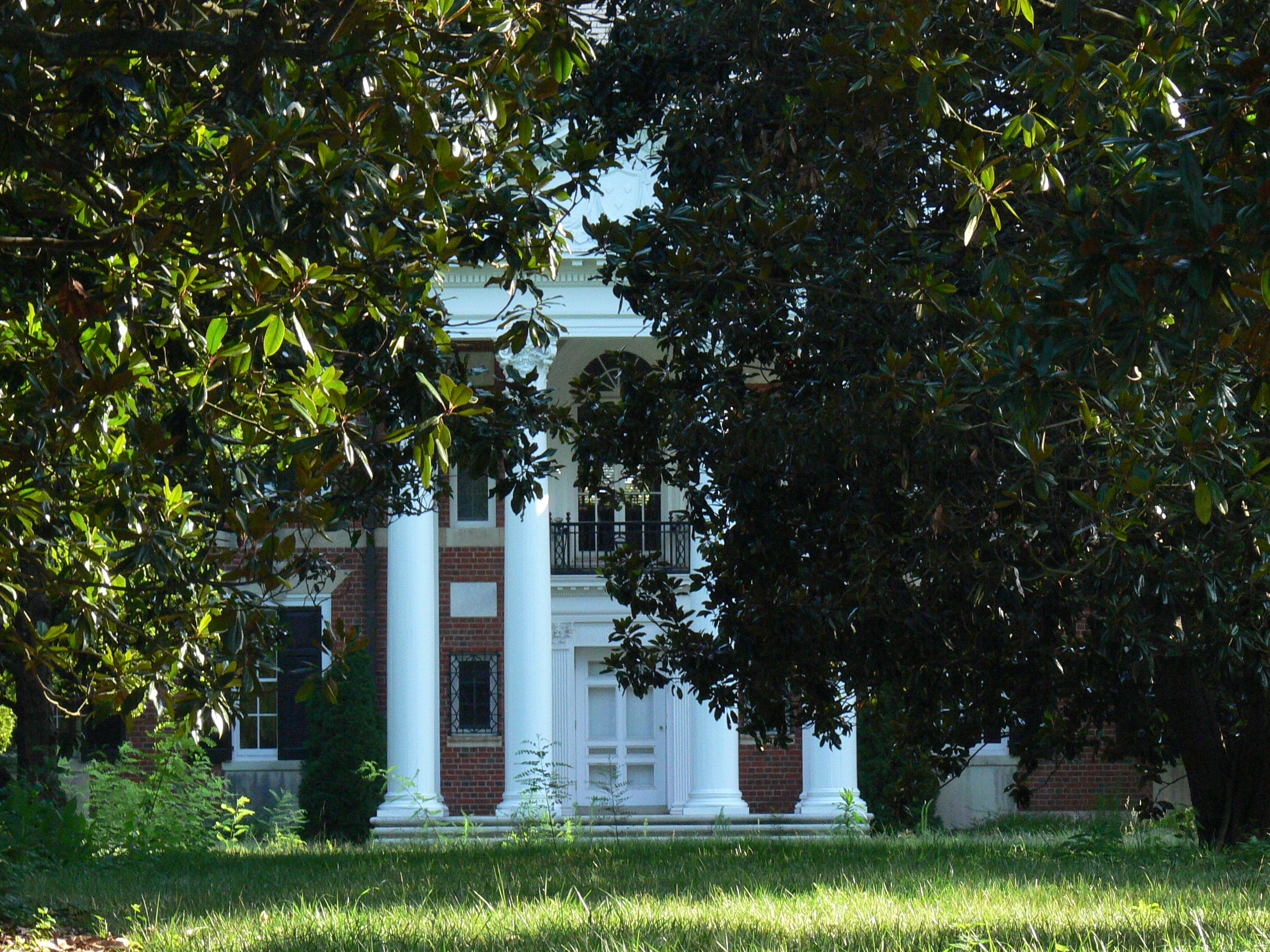
Westbourne, home of Douglas Southall Freeman

Freeman married Inez Virginia Goddin on February 5, 1914. They had three children: Mary Tyler, Anne Ballard, and James Douglas. Mary Tyler Freeman married Leslie Cheek Jr., longtime director of the Virginia Museum of Fine Arts, and became a founder or influential officer of several important community organizations, as well as president of the Robert E. Lee Memorial Foundation. The family lived (and Freeman died) in a mansion he named Westbourne in Richmond's west end, a house listed (in 2000) in the National Register of Historic Places.

== Death and legacy ==
Douglas Southall Freeman died of a heart attack on June 13, 1953, at his home in Richmond, Virginia, at the age of 67. On the morning of his death he had delivered his usual radio broadcast from Richmond. He was buried in Hollywood Cemetery in Richmond.

Freeman's newspaper editorials and daily radio broadcasts made him one of the most influential Virginians of his day, his analysis of World War I and World War II military campaigns bringing him recognition throughout the country, especially in military circles. President Franklin Delano Roosevelt thanked him for suggesting the use of the term "liberation," rather than "invasion," of Europe.

Military commanders such as Admiral Chester W. Nimitz and Generals George C. Marshall, Douglas MacArthur, and Dwight D. Eisenhower sought his friendship and advice. Eisenhower said Freeman first convinced him to think seriously about running for the presidency. In 1958, Freeman was posthumously awarded his second Pulitzer Prize for his seven-volume biography of George Washington. In 1955, the Virginia Associated Press Broadcasters honored Freeman by creating the Douglas Southall Freeman Award for public service in radio journalism.

Eric Foner is more critical of Freeman, whose biography of Lee Foner calls a "hagiography," criticizing its lack of nuance and the limited attention paid to Lee's relationship to slavery. Charles B. Dew wrote that Freeman's "magisterial" Lee's Lieutenants, United Daughters of the Confederacy magazine, and Facts the Historians Leave Out: A Youth's Confederate Primer by John S. Tilley were crucial titles in his adolescent indoctrination into the mainstream white Southern worldview of the 1950s.

In 2021, some students and faculty at the University of Richmond, where Freeman served as Rector for seven years, criticized the university board of trustees for refusing to remove Freeman's name from a campus building, although he had "supported racial segregation, opposed interracial marriage and promoted racist concepts underlying the eugenics movement." The "greatest inheritance," Freeman once said, was "clean blood, right-thinking ancestry."

== Honors and awards ==
- 1935 Pulitzer Prize for R. E. Lee: A Biography (4 volumes)
- 1951 best news commentary over larger radio stations from Virginia Associated Press Broadcasters
- 1958 Pulitzer Prize (posthumous) for George Washington: A Biography (6 volumes)
- Douglas S. Freeman High School in Henrico County named in his honor
- University of Richmond Freeman Hall named in his honor
- Virginia Historical Marker Q-6-17, located on Rivermont Avenue in Lynchburg, Virginia, commemorates Freeman's life and work

== Bibliography ==
- A Calendar of Confederate Papers (1908)
- Lee's Dispatches to Jefferson Davis, 1862–1865 (1915)
- R. E. Lee: A Biography (4 volumes) (1934–1935). vol. 1, vol. 2, vol. 3, vol. 4, and abridged version by Richard Harwell
- The Cornerstones of Stratford: Address at the Dedication of Stratford, October 12, 1935 (1935)
- The South to Posterity: An Introduction to the Writings of Confederate History (1939)
- Lee's Lieutenants: A Study in Command Volume 1: Manassas to Malvern Hill (abridged ed. by Stephen W. Sears) (1942)OCLC 457156
- Lee's Lieutenants: A Study in Command Volume 2: Cedar Mountain to Chancellorsville (1943)OCLC 457156
- Lee's Lieutenants: A Study in Command Volume 3: Gettysburg to Appomattox (1944)OCLC 457156
- George Washington Volume 1: Young Washington (1948)
- George Washington Volume 2: Young Washington (1948)
- George Washington Volume 3: Planter and Patriot (1951)
- George Washington Volume 4: Leader of the Revolution (1951)
- George Washington Volume 5: Victory with the Help of France (1952)
- Freeman, Douglas Southall; Malone, Dumas (1954). Carroll, John Alexander; Ashworth, Mary Wells (eds.). George Washington, a Biography: Patriot and President. Vol. 6. Scribner & Sons.
- George Washington Volume 7: First in Peace (1957, by John Alexander Carroll and Mary Wells Ashworth, based on Freeman's original research)
- Ferling E., John (2007). Almost a Miracle. Oxford University Press. ISBN 978-0-1997-5847-0.
