= Leonard D. White =

American historian (1891–1958)

Leonard Dupee White (January 17, 1891 – February 23, 1958) was an American historian who specialized in public administration in the United States. His technique was to study administration in the context of grouped U.S. presidential terms. A founder of the field, White worked at the University of Chicago after service in the administrations of Franklin D. Roosevelt.

== Biography ==
White was born in Acton, Massachusetts, to John Sidney White and Bertha H. (Dupee) White. He received his bachelor's degree from Dartmouth in 1914, followed by his master's in 1915, after which he taught there for a few years. He received his doctorate from the University of Chicago in 1921.

In 1934 he went to Washington to serve on the U.S. Civil Service Commission and Central Statistics Board. He died in Chicago, Illinois, in 1958.

The last of White's four historical books subtitled A Study in Administrative History was The Republican Era: 1869–1901. It was published by Macmillan in 1958, the year of his death, "with the assistance of Jean Schneider". Next year White posthumously and Schneider shared the 1959 Pulitzer Prize for History.

He was the founding editor-in-chief of the American Society for Public Administration's Public Administration Review between 1940 and 1943.

== Awards ==
- Guggenheim Fellow, 1927–1928
- 1948 Woodrow Wilson Foundation Book Award, The Federalists: A Study in Administrative History
- 1959 Pulitzer Prize for History, The Republican Era: 1869–1901

== Works ==
- "The Origin of Utility Commissions in Massachusetts", Journal of Political Economy, March 1921; also distributed separately by University of Chicago Press – related to Ph.D. thesis, U. of Chicago, 1921
- Conditions of Municipal Employment in Chicago: A Study in Morale (1925)
- Introduction to the Study of Public Administration (Prentice-Hall, 1926), renewed 1954
- The Frontiers of Public Administration (2 vols.) (1936) (with John Merriman Gaus and Marshall Edward Dimock)
- Defense and War Administration, 1939–1942 (1942)
- The Federalists: A Study in Administrative History 1789–1801 (MacMillan, 1948)
- The Jeffersonians: A Study in Administrative History 1801–1829 (MacMillan, 1951)
- The Jacksonians: A Study in Administrative History 1829–1861 (MacMillan, 1954)
- The Republican Era, 1869–1901: A Study in Administrative History (MacMillan, 1958)
- Leonard D. White and the Study of Public Administration (March 1965, Public Administration Review)

== See also ==
- Leonard D. White Award
