= Lee's Lieutenants =

Lee's Lieutenants: A Study in Command
- First editions
- Author: Douglas Southall Freeman
- Language: English
- Subject: War; historical
- Publisher: C. Scribner's Sons
- Publication date: 1942-1944
- Publication place: United States
- Media type: Hardcover
- OCLC: 457156

Lee's Lieutenants: A Study in Command is a three-volume work by Douglas Southall Freeman on Robert E. Lee's generals of the Army of Northern Virginia during the American Civil War. The book provides an understanding of the fundamental aspects of leadership. Former West Point assistant professor Mike Hennelly states that the book provides examples how Lee "was able to build a unified, trusting and motivated command team that came closer to the ideal than most armies in history."

A one-volume abridged version was completed by Stephen Sears and published in 1998. In the introduction, James McPherson writes that Freeman's book was often used as required reading in military schools.
