= The Organization and Administration of the Union Army, 1861–1865 =

History book by Fred Albert Shannon

- Title page for The Organization and Administration of the Union Army, 1861–1865 (1965)
- Author: Fred Albert Shannon
- Language: English
- Genre: Non-fiction
- Publication date: 1928
- Publication place: United States

The Organization and Administration of the Union Army, 1861–1865 is a two-volume nonfiction history book by American historian Fred Albert Shannon. The book is about Union Army history, including recruitment and enlistment during the American Civil War. It was published in 1928, and Shannon won the Pulitzer Prize for History for the book in 1929.
