= Jill Lepore bibliography =

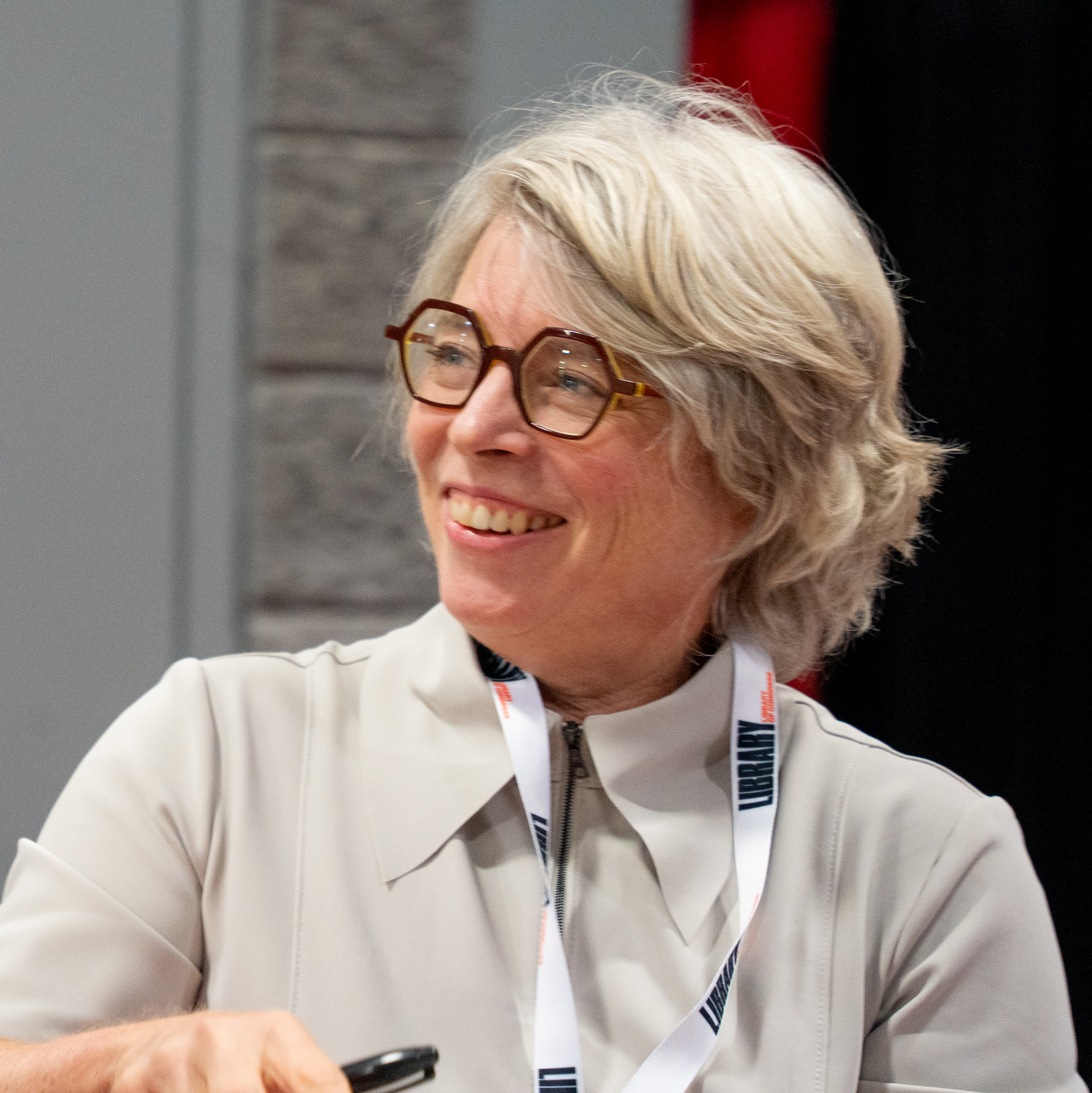
- Lepore in 2025
- Books↙: 11
- Novels↙: 1
- Articles↙: 48
- Books edited↙: 1

A list of works by or about Jill Lepore, American historian.

== Books ==
=== Non-fiction ===
- Lepore, Jill (1998). The name of war : King Philip's War and the origins of American identity. New York: Alfred A. Knopf.
- —, ed. (2000). Encounters in the New World : a history in documents. New York: Oxford University Press.
- — (2002). A is for American : letters and other characters in the newly United States. New York: Alfred A. Knopf.
- — (2005). New York burning : liberty, slavery, and conspiracy in eighteenth-century Manhattan. New York: Alfred A. Knopf.
- — (2010). The whites of their eyes : the Tea Party's revolution and the battle over American history. Princeton, N.J.: Princeton University Press.
- — (2012). The mansion of happiness : a history of life and death. New York: Alfred A. Knopf.
- — (2012). The story of America : essays on origins. Princeton, N.J.: Princeton University Press.
- — (2013). Book of ages : the life and opinions of Jane Franklin. New York: Alfred A. Knopf.
- — (2014). The secret history of Wonder Woman. New York: Alfred A. Knopf.
- — (2016). Joe Gould's teeth. New York: Alfred A. Knopf.
- — (2018). These truths : a history of the United States. New York: W. W. Norton.
- — (2019). This America : the case for the nation. New York: W. W. Norton.
- — (2020). If then : how the Simulmatics Corporation invented the future. Liveright.
- — (2023). The Deadline. New York: Liveright.
- — (2025). We the People: A History of the U.S. Constitution. New York: Liveright.

=== Novels ===
- Kamensky, Jane & Jill Lepore (2008). Blindspot : by a Gentleman in Exile and a Lady in Disguise. New York: Spiegel & Grau.

== Articles and essays ==
- Lepore, Jill (June 2001). "Historians who love too much : reflections on microhistory and biography". Journal of American History. 88 (1): 129–144. doi:10.2307/2674921. JSTOR 2674921.
- — (October 24, 2005). "People power". Books. The New Yorker. 81 (33): 80–84.
- — (April 24, 2006). "Plymouth Rocked". A Critic at Large. The New Yorker. 82 (10): 167–170.
- — (May 8, 2006). "Goodbye, Columbus". A Critic at Large. The New Yorker. 82 (12): 74–78.
- — (October 9, 2006). "Westward Ho!". Books. The New Yorker. 82 (32): 71–80.
- — (October 16, 2006). "The Sharpened Quill". Books. The New Yorker. 82 (33): 167–174.
- — (November 6, 2006). "Noah's Mark". Life and Letters. The New Yorker. 82 (36): 78–87.
- — (April 2, 2007). "Our Town". American Chronicles. The New Yorker. 83 (6): 40–45.
- — (May 21, 2007). "The Meaning of Life". American Chronicles. The New Yorker. 83 (13): 38–43.
- — (September 17, 2007). "Party Time". Books. The New Yorker. 83 (27): 94–98.
- — (October 29, 2007). "Vast Designs". Books. The New Yorker. 83 (33): 88–92.
- — (January 28, 2008). "The Creed". A Critic at Large. The New Yorker. 83 (45): 78–83.
- — (March 17, 2008). "The Divider". On Television. The New Yorker. 84 (5): 90–91.
- — (March 24, 2008). "Just the facts, Ma'am". A Critic at Large. The New Yorker. 84 (6): 79–83.
- — (April 14, 2008). "Prior Convictions". A Critic at Large. The New Yorker. 84 (9): 71–75.
- — (May 12, 2008). "Our Own devices". Books. The New Yorker. 84 (13): 118–122.
- — (July 21, 2008). "The Lion and the Mouse". Life and Letters. The New Yorker. 84 (21): 66–73.
- — (September 22, 2008). "President Tom's Cabin". Books. The New Yorker. 84 (29): 86–91.
- — (October 12, 2008). "Rock, Paper, Scissors". Annals of Democracy. The New Yorker. 84 (32): 90–96.
- — (October 20, 2008). "Bound for Glory". A Critic at Large. The New Yorker. 84 (33): 80–85.
- — (January 12, 2009). "The speech : have Inaugural Addresses been getting worse?". Annals of the Presidency. The New Yorker.
- — (January 19, 2009). "Baby food : if breast is best, why are women bottling their milk?". Maternity Dept. The New Yorker.
- — (April 27, 2009). "The Humbug". The Critics. A Critic at Large. The New Yorker.
- — (March 14, 2011). "Twilight". American Chronicles. The New Yorker. 87 (4): 30–35.
- — (November 14, 2011). "Birthright". American Chronicles. The New Yorker. 87 (36): 44–55.
- — (November 26, 2012). "Tax time". American Chronicles. The New Yorker. 88 (37): 24–29.
- — (January 28, 2013). "The force". The Critics. A Critic at Large. The New Yorker. 88 (45): 70–76.
- — (March 18, 2013). "The Dark Ages : terrorism, counterterrorism, and the law of torment". A Critic at Large. The New Yorker. 89 (5): 28–32.
- — (June 3, 2013). "The odyssey : Robert Ripley and his world". The Critics. Books. The New Yorker. 89 (16): 62–66.
- — (July 8–15, 2013). "The prodigal daughter : writing, history, mourning". Personal History. The New Yorker. 89 (20): 34–40.
- — (December 2, 2013). "Long division : measuring the polarization of American politics". The Critics. A Critic at Large. The New Yorker. 89 (39): 75–79.
- — (April 21, 2014). "The Warren brief : reading Elizabeth Warren". The Critics. Books. The New Yorker. 90 (9): 96–101.
- — (May 12, 2014). "Away from my desk : the office from beginning to end". The Critics. Books. The New Yorker. 90 (12): 72–76.
- — (June 23, 2014). "The disruption machine". Annals of Enterprise. The New Yorker. 90.
- — (August 25, 2014). "The crooked and the dead : does the Constitution protect corruption?". American Chronicles. The New Yorker. 90 (24): 22–28.
- — (September 22, 2014). "The Last Amazon: Wonder Woman returns". Annals of Entertainment. The New Yorker. 90.
- — (March 16, 2015). "Richer and poorer : accounting for inequality". Annals of Society. The New Yorker. 91 (4): 26–32.
- — (April 20, 2015). "The rule of history; Magna Carta, the Bill of Rights, and the hold of time". A Critic at Large. The New Yorker. 91 (9): 83–88.
- — (May 25, 2015). "To have and to hold : reproduction, marriage, and the Constitution". Dept. of Justice. The New Yorker. 91 (14): 34–39.
- — (July 27, 2015). "Joe Gould's teeth : the long-lost story of the longest book ever written". Annals of Annals. The New Yorker. 91 (21): 48–59.
- — (February 1, 2016). "Baby Doe : a political history of tragedy". Annals of Children's Welfare. The New Yorker. 91 (46): 46–57.
- — (February 22, 2016). "The party crashers : is the new populism about the message or the medium?". The Political Scene. The New Yorker. 92 (2): 22–27.
- — (March 21, 2016). "After the fact : in the history of truth, a new chapter begins". The Critics. Books. The New Yorker. 92 (6): 91–94.
- — (August 8–15, 2016). "The war and the roses : fear and loving in the convention hall". Annals of Politics. The New Yorker. 92 (24): 24–32.
- — (January 30, 2017). "Autumn of the atom : how arguments about nuclear weapons shaped the climate–change debate". American Chronicles. The New Yorker. 92 (47): 22–28.
- — (February 12–19, 2018). "It's still alive : two hundred years of 'Frankenstein'". The Critics. Life and Letters. The New Yorker. 94 (1): 86–91.
- — (March 26, 2018). "The Right Way to Remember Rachel Carson". A Critic at Large. The New Yorker. 94 (6): 64–72.
- — (January 7, 2019). "Unforeseen". The Talk of the Town. Comment. The New Yorker. 94 (43): 13–14.
- — (March 4, 2019). "The robot caravan : automation, A.I., and the coming invasion". Annals of Technology. The New Yorker. 95 (2): 20–24.
- — (May 20, 2019). "Bound to win : memoirs of the Presidential candidates". The Critics. A Critic at Large. The New Yorker. 95 (13): 76–82.
- — (July 8, 2019). "The Deadline". Personal History. On the lingering of loss. The New Yorker. 95 (19): 20–24.
- — (April 6, 2020). "The history of loneliness". The New Yorker.
- — (September 7, 2020). "These four walls : living indoors". The Critics. A Critic at Large. The New Yorker. 96 (26): 67–71.
- — (September 9, 2020). "Scientists use big data to sway elections and predict riots : welcome to the 1960s". Nature. 585 (7825): 348–350. Bibcode:2020Natur.585..348L. doi:10.1038/d41586-020-02607-8. PMID 32939063. S2CID 221769628.
- — (October 4, 2021). "The underworld : the effort to reclaim Black burial grounds and remains has unearthed conflicts over history and inheritance". American Chronicles. The New Yorker. 97 (31): 34–45.
- — (May 23, 2022). "The morning after". The Talk of the Town. Comment. The New Yorker. 98 (13): 11–12.
- — (May 30, 2022). "Easy rider : life on a bike". The Critics. Books. The New Yorker. 98 (14): 60–64.
- — (December 11, 2023). "What Happened When the U.S. Failed to Prosecute an Insurrectionist Ex-President". American Chronicles. The New Yorker.
- — (7 October 2024). "The Chit-Chatbot: Is talking with a machine a conversation?". The New Yorker: 12–16.
- — (25 May 2026). "Robot Lit: The prehistory of A.I. slop". The New Yorker: 54–58. "Machine[-produced] junk [literature] has become known as A.I. slop – 'slop' was Merriam-Webster's 2025 Word of the Year – and it's everywhere, gumming up the works, slowing down traffic, and making a god-awful mess."

== Critical studies and reviews of Lepore's work ==
- Garner, Dwight (October 23, 2014). "Books - Her Past Unchained 'The Secret History of Wonder Woman,' by Jill Lepore". New York Times.
