= Jacqueline Jones =

American historian

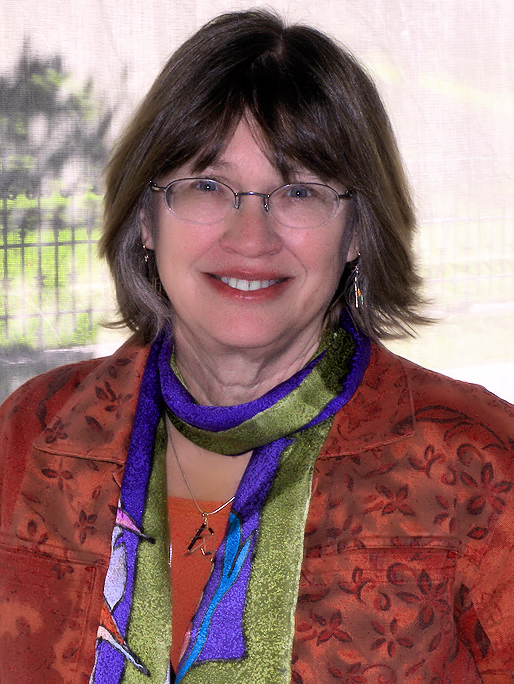
- Jacqueline Jones at the 2009 Texas Book Festival
- Born: June 17, 1948 (age 77); Delaware, U.S.

Academic background
- Education: University of Delaware (BA); University of Wisconsin–Madison (PhD)

Academic work
- Discipline: American social history (including feminist economics), race, and class)
- School or tradition: Feminist economics
- Institutions: University of Texas at Austin

Jacqueline Jones (born 17 June 1948) is an American social historian and winner of the Pulitzer Prize in history. She held the Walter Prescott Webb Chair in History and Ideas from 2008 to 2017, is the Ellen C. Temple Professor of Women’s History Emerita at the University of Texas at Austin, and is the past president of the American Historical Association. Her expertise is in American social history in addition to writing on economics (including feminist economics), race, slavery, and class. She is a Macarthur Fellow, Bancroft Prize Winner, and Pulitzer Prize winner in 2024 after twice being a finalist.

== Early life and education ==
Jones was born in Delaware. Jones's mother taught at Delaware Technical and Community College. Her father, Albert P. Jones (died 1995), worked for DuPont and was the president of the Delaware State Board of Education for many years; she attended an elementary school in Christiana, Delaware that was renamed in his honor a year after his death. Jones received a B.A. in 1970 from the University of Delaware, and a Ph.D. in 1976 from the University of Wisconsin–Madison.

== Career ==
She has held academic positions at Wellesley College, Brown University and Brandeis University. In July 1999 Jones was awarded a MacArthur Fellowship. Although the award typically allows academics to take time off from their teaching, she decided to wait before beginning her research and worked through the period of the fellowship, saying, "I think I will take time off in a few years, but I really like being here on campus, being around my colleagues, teaching." Jones has also been awarded a Ford Foundation fellowship, a Woodrow Wilson Fellowship, and an American Council of Learned Societies Fellowship, and won the Pulitzer Prize in history for her 2023 book No Right to an Honest Living: The Struggles of Boston’s Black Workers in the Civil War Era. The Pulitzer jury cited Jones's "original reconstruction of free Black life in Boston that profoundly reshapes our understanding of the city’s abolitionist legacy and the challenging reality for its Black residents."

== Ideas and awards ==
In 1986, Jones's second book Labor of Love, Labor of Sorrow: Black Women, Work, and the Family from Slavery to the Present won her the Bancroft Prize. In Labor of Love, Labor of Sorrow, Jones demonstrates her extensive knowledge of the history of the South from 1830 to 1915. The book begins as a study of African Americans and the hardships they faced during the nineteenth century but then develops to include commentary on the impact of class and gender on women in the South. The book attempts to debunk ideas about race and also to blend analysis of the hardships faced by women and blacks into a single integrated picture centering on the figure of the black working-class woman. The book's combination of historical and feminist scholarship is characteristic of Jones's career. Upon winning a MacArthur fellowship Jones noted that finishing her Bancroft-winning volume inspired her to write her third book, The Dispossessed, America's Underclasses from the Civil War to the Present, which examines poverty in America across the boundaries of race and gender. That book would go on to win her a Choice Award for Outstanding Academic Title in 1992 as well as finalist standing for the Lillian Smith Award for non-fiction. In 2001, Jones published Creek Walking, a memoir of her childhood in Delaware during the 1950s. Although her expertise is primarily in African American history, Jones's books range widely, from the effect of economic policies on workers' lives to American educational history. Her understanding of women's history has gained her recognition outside her own field among feminist circles, and she continues to reach non-academic audiences with the expansion of her areas of research. American Work: Four Centuries of Black and White Labor was a History Book Club Selection and in 2002 she was named a fellow in the American Academy of Arts and Sciences. Jones has reflected in an interview that her work involves "writing about issues of race and class and how the United States has changed over the years, how different groups have viewed each other and interacted, how certain groups have been assigned certain kinds of work." Her history writing increasingly features case studies focusing on the overlooked but nonetheless exemplary lives of individuals.

Her 544-page book, No Right to an Honest Living, was published by Hachette Book Group in January 2023. In a review in The Christian Science Monitor, Barbara Spindel called Jones's book about the lives of Blacks in post-bellum Boston "remarkable" and said that "Jones brings this history to life with graceful storytelling and a generous use of primary sources. She returns to many of the same figures again and again, allowing readers to follow their experiences over time."

When asked by Politico magazine to weigh in on which historical figures Donald Trump was comparable to, Jones said he echoed the comments of past Mississippi Governor James K. Vardaman.

== Publications ==
- Jones, Jacqueline (1980). Soldiers of Light and Love: Northern Teachers and Georgia Blacks, 1865-1873. Chapel Hill: University of North Carolina Press. ISBN 9780807814352.
- Jones, Jacqueline (1985). Labor of Love, Labor of Sorrow: Black Women, Work, and the Family from Slavery to the Present. New York: Basic Books. ISBN 9780465037568.
- Jones, Jacqueline (1992). The Dispossessed: America's Underclasses from the Civil War to the Present. New York: Basic Books. ISBN 9780465016747.
- Jones, Jacqueline (1998). American Work: Four Centuries of Black and White Labor. New York: W.W. Norton. ISBN 9780393045611.
- Jones, Jacqueline (1999). A Social History of the Laboring Classes: From Colonial Times to the Present. Malden, Massachusetts: Blackwell Publishers. ISBN 9780631207702.
- Jones, Jacqueline (2001). Creek Walking: Growing Up in Delaware in the 1950s. Newark London: University of Delaware Press Associated University Presses. ISBN 9780874137545.
- Jones, Jacqueline (2008). Saving Savannah: The City and the Civil War. New York: Alfred A. Knopf. ISBN 9781400042937.
- Jones, Jacqueline (2013). A Dreadful Deceit: The Myth of Race from the Colonial Era to Obama's America. New York: Basic Books. ISBN 9780465055678.
- Jones, Jacqueline (2017). Goddess of Anarchy: The Life and Times of Lucy Parsons, American Radical. New York: Basic Books. ISBN 9780465078998.
- Jones, Jacqueline (2023). No Right to an Honest Living: The Struggles of Boston's Black Workers in the Civil War Era. New York: Hachette Book Group. ISBN 9781541619791.

== Personal life ==
Jones is married to the political scientist and law professor Jeffrey Abramson, author of We, The Jury and Minerva's Owl, among other texts. The couple has two daughters, Sarah Jones Abramson and Anna Jones Abramson.

== See also ==
- Feminist economics
- List of feminist economists
