= Between War and Peace: The Potsdam Conference =

History book by Margaret Leech

- First edition
- Author: Herbert Feis
- Language: English
- Publisher: Princeton University Press
- Publication date: 1960
- Publication place: United States
- Pages: 367

Between War and Peace: The Potsdam Conference is a nonfiction history book by Herbert Feis. It won the 1961 Pulitzer Prize for History.
