= Frederic L. Paxson =

American historian (1877–1948)

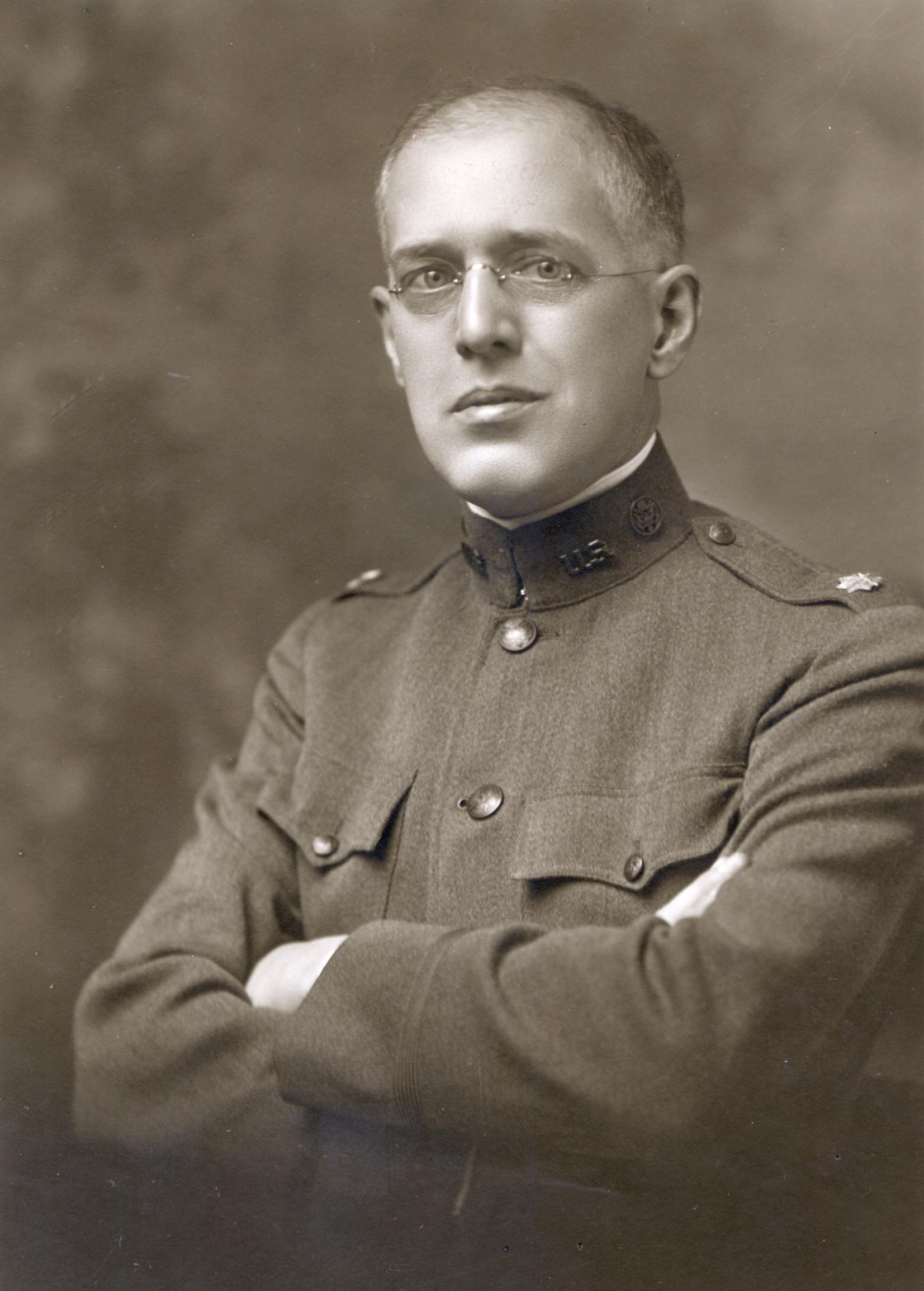
- Born: February 23, 1877; Philadelphia, United States
- Died: October 24, 1948 (aged 71); Berkeley, California

Academic background
- Education: University of Pennsylvania
- Thesis: Independence of the South American Republics: A Study in Recognition and Foreign Policy (1903)
- Doctoral advisor: Albert Bushnell Hart; John Bach McMaster

Academic work
- Doctoral students: Earl S. Pomeroy; Alvin Harvey Hansen

Frederic Logan Paxson (February 23, 1877 in Philadelphia – October 24, 1948 in Berkeley, California) was an American historian. He also served as the President of Mississippi Valley Historical Association. He had undergraduate and PhD degrees from the University of Pennsylvania, as well as a master's from Harvard University. He taught at Wisconsin (1910 to 1932) as a successor to Frederick Jackson Turner and the University of California-Berkeley from 1932 to 1947.

As a historian, he had an authority on the American frontier. His 1925 Pulitzer Prize was for History of the American Frontier, 1763–1893.

== Teaching ==
Among his students were Earl S. Pomeroy and Ira Clark. They admired his teaching greatly. Clark said Paxson gave students "a sense of participating in his exploration of the past" and of "contact with living men and problems of narrative". Pomeroy said that Paxson was not given to philosophical speculation, but rather spoke of "techniques and of specific problems and their meaning more than of validity in the abstract". Paxson also advised his students to make an attempt at synthesis, however tentative and inexact. Pomeroy notes that Paxson had a masterful knowledge of political history and "found the political framework, among other conventional frameworks, indispensable in telling a general story". However, Paxson also insisted on the importance of economic and social history and had himself published on such subjects as the rise of sport and the highway movement.

Paxson coined the term "Historical Engineering" to describe the wartime work he had done in revising textbooks to suit the mood of the era of the World War, by "explaining the issues of the war that we might the better win it".

== Works ==
At Pennsylvania, Paxson studied history, international law, and economics. His major advisor was the historian John Bach McMaster, who encouraged him to read widely and use new sources such as newspapers, in addition to the archival resources in London and Washington needed for diplomatic studies. After publishing his dissertation in 1903 on American foreign policy regarding the independence of the South American republics in the 1820s, he moved away from diplomatic issues to Western studies. He started with a series of studies on Colorado, planning a book that was never finished. He then moved to broader narrative histories of the frontier, culminating with his prize-winning History of the American Frontier, 1763–1893 in 1924. It covers a very wide sweep of topics, with unusual strength in handling violent relations between the frontiersman and the Indians. Paxson emphasized the impact on people of the process of moving to the west, downplaying the static aspects of specific localities. During the First World War, despite his Quaker upbringing, he served as a major in the War Department's historical bureau and used his writing skills to explain the historical context of American policies.

- The Independence of the South American Republics: A Study in Recognition and Foreign Policy, 1903.
- The Last American Frontier, 1910.
- The Civil War, 1911.
- "The Rise of Sport", Mississippi Valley Historical Review, (Sept. 1917).
- War Cyclopedia: A Handbook for Ready Reference on the Great War, 1918 (ed.).
- The New Nation, 1919.
- History of the American Frontier, 1763–1893, Boston: Houghton Mifflin, 1924.
- American Democracy and the World War, (3 vols.), 1936–1948.
- The Great Demobilization, American Historical Association Presidential Address, Dec. 29, 1938.
- America at War, 1917–1918, 1939.
- Postwar Years, Normalcy, 1918–1923, 1948.
