= Samuel Danforth =

American philosopher

Samuel Danforth (1626–1674) was a Puritan minister, preacher, poet, and astronomer, the second pastor of The First Church in Roxbury and an associate of the Rev. John Eliot of Roxbury, Massachusetts, known as the “Apostle to the Indians.”

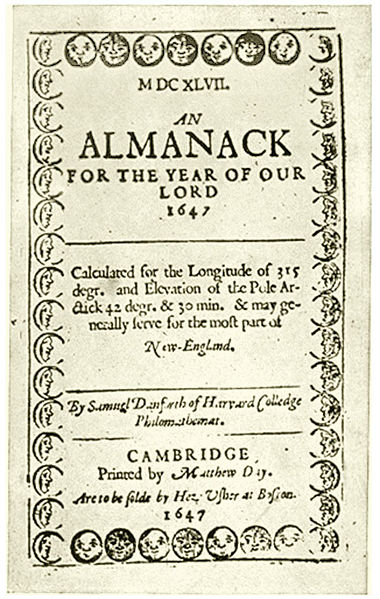
Danforth's 1647 Almanack, title page

== Life ==
He was born October 17, 1626, in Framlingham, Suffolk, England, the sixth of seven children of Nicholas Danforth (1589–1639) and Elizabeth Symmes Danforth (c.1596–1629). Six surviving children— Elizabeth (1619–1673), Anna (1622–1704), Thomas (1623–1699), Lydia (1625–1686), Samuel, and Jonathan (1628–1712) —emigrated with their father to Massachusetts in 1634. After their father died in 1639, Samuel lived with Thomas Shepard, pastor of the church in Cambridge, and later attended Harvard College, where he graduated in 1643 and remained as a tutor until 1650, whereupon he became one of the five founding Fellows of Harvard.

Danforth's studies included astronomy, and during this time he published three almanacs (for 1647, 1648, and 1649), which are the earliest surviving American examples of the form. A fourth (for the year 1646) is also attributed to him, although the single surviving copy is missing the first several pages and any attribution. These almanacs included his own original poetry (some in the form of enigmas or word puzzles), and are among the earliest examples of secular verse published in New England. They also contained—in addition to celestial tables, tide tables, calendars, and dates of court sessions—brief chronologies of significant events in New England's history. In 1650 he became pastor at The First Church in Roxbury, where Rev. John Eliot was Teaching Elder, and was ordained on September 24, 1650. In 1651, he married Mary Wilson (1633–1713), daughter of the Rev. John Wilson of Boston, with whom he had twelve children in 24 years. He died November 19, 1674.

No copies of his "Catechism" (published in 1650 or 1651) are known to have survived (see Roden, The Cambridge Press 1638-1692). He published An Astronomical Description of the Late Comet in 1665 (reprinted in London the following year). In 1670, he was invited to give the annual election sermon to the General Assembly, which was afterwards printed as A Brief Recognition Recognition of New-Englands Errand into the Wilderness and is regarded as one of the finest examples of the “jeremiad” form. In April 1674, he delivered what is regarded as the first published “execution sermon”:The Cry of Sodom Enquired Into, on the occasion of the sentencing to death by hanging of Benjamin Goad, a young man from his congregation convicted of bestiality upon being discovered in a compromised position with a lady-horse. This work was published shortly after his death.

William Sprague, in his Annals of the American Pulpit (I, 139), describes him as follows: “As a preacher, he was remarkable for sustaining all his positions by arguments from Scripture; for adhering closely to the main object before him; for a free, clear and rapid utterance; and for a depth and power of feeling which in almost every sermon manifested itself in tears. ... He was particularly watchful against the inroads of immorality among the young. He used his influence to prevent any, except persons of correct moral habits, from keeping houses of public entertainment; and when he saw from his study window any of the people of the town tippling at the tavern, he made conscience to go directly to them and administer a pointed rebuke.”

== Family ==
Three of Danforth's children died in infancy—Samuel (aged 7 months) in 1653, Thomas (aged 10 days) in 1672, and Elizabeth (aged 2 weeks) in 1673). Three others—Mary (aged 5 years), Elizabeth (aged 3), and Sarah (aged 1)—died in December 1659. His funeral remarks on this occasion were reprinted by Cotton Mather in his Magnalia. Two more children—Elizabeth (aged 7) and Sarah (aged 2)—died in October 1672. His son John (1660–1730) graduated from Harvard College in 1677 and was minister at Dorchester from 1682 until his death. The other surviving son, Samuel (1666–1727), graduated from Harvard College in 1683, and served as the minister at Taunton from 1687 until his death. Daughter Mary (1663–1734) married Edward Bromfield (1649–1734) in 1683. Daughter Abiel, born two months after her father's death, married Thomas Fitch in 1694, and, after his death, John Osborn in 1741; she died in or before 1745.

His widow Mary was married in 1682 to Joseph Rock of Boston, who died the next year.

His older brother Thomas Danforth (1623–1699) was treasurer of Harvard College, deputy governor, and justice of the colony's superior court. His younger brother Jonathan was a resident and founder of Billerica, Massachusetts. Sister Elizabeth married Andrew Belcher (1639–1673) of Cambridge; sister Anna married Matthew Bridge (1615–1700) of Lexington; sister Lydia married William Beamont (1608–1698) of Saybrook, Connecticut; and sister Mary Danforth, who also came over to the Americas with Samuel, married John Parish. (More complete genealogical information is online via AOL)

For further biographical information, see Cotton Mather, Magnalia Christi Americana, v.2; Sibley's Harvard Graduates, v. 1; Dictionary of Literary Biography, v.24, pp. 83–85; and C. K. Dillaway, History of the Grammar School (Roxbury, 1860), pp. 127–130.

== Works ==
- MDCXLVII. An Almanack for the Year of Our Lord 1647. Cambridge, Mass., 1647.
- MDCXLVIII. An Almanack for the Year of Our Lord 1648. Cambridge, MA, 1648.
- MDCXLIX. An Almanack for the Year of Our Lord 1649. Cambridge, MA, 1649.
- [Roxbury Catechism]. Cambridge, MA, 1650/51(?).
- An Astronomical Description of the Late Comet, or Blazing Star, as it appeared in New-England in the 9th, 10th, 11th, and in the Beginning of the 12th Moneth, 1664. Together with a Brief Theological Explanation Thereof. Cambridge, MA, 1665; London, 1666.
- A Brief Recognition of New-Englands Errand into the Wilderness; Made in the Audience of the General Assembly of the Massachusetts Colony, at Boston in N.E. on the 11th of the third Moneth, 1670, being the day of Election there. Cambridge, Mass., 1671. —Reprinted in A. W. Plumstead, The Wall and the Garden: Selected Massachusetts Election Sermons 1670–1775 (Minneapolis, 1968) and Michael Warner, American Sermons (New York, 1999)
- The Cry of Sodom Enquired Into; Upon Occasion of the Arraignment and Condemnation of BENJAMIN GOAD, for his Prodigious Villany. Cambridge, MA, 1674.
- “A Letter out of Grief,” in Cotton Mather, Magnalia Christi Americana. London, 1702.
- Samuel Danforth's Almanack Poems and Chronological Tables 1647-1649 (online edition)

=== Works about ===
- Perry Miller’s Errand into the Wilderness (Cambridge, 1956) takes its title from Danforth's election sermon (although Miller himself maintained otherwise).
- Sacvan Bercovitch's The American Jeremiad offers a significant reinterpretation of the tradition.
