= White Southerners =

Arguable ethnic group

Total population
- ▼64,685,898 (2020 census) ▼57.70% of the total population

Regions with significant populations
- Southern United States (except in counties with a Black majority or a Hispanic majority)
- Texas: 14,609,365
- Florida: 12,422,961
- North Carolina: 6,488,459
- Georgia: 5,555,483
- Virginia: 5,208,856
- Tennessee: 4,990,938
- South Carolina: 3,243,442
- Alabama: 3,220,452
- Louisiana: 2,657,652
- Oklahoma: 2,514,885
- Arkansas: 2,114,512
- Mississippi: 1,658,893

Languages
- Southern American English, Appalachian English, Isleño Spanish, Louisiana Creole, Texan English, Texan German, Cajun English, Louisiana French, Italian and Spanish

Religion
- Predominantly Protestantism (especially Southern Baptist, nondenominational, and Methodist), also Judaism

Related ethnic groups
- Old Stock Americans, Scotch-Irish Americans, Black Southerners, Cajuns, Louisiana Creoles, Melungeons, Louisiana Isleños, Floridanos, Jews

White Southerners, historically called White Confederates or Southrons, are European Americans from the Southern United States, originating from the various waves of Northwestern European immigration to the region beginning in the 17th century.

Academic John Shelton Reed argues that "Southerners' differences from the American mainstream have been similar in kind, if not degree, to those of the immigrant ethnic groups". Reed states that Southerners, as other ethnic groups, are marked by differences from the national norm, noting that they tend to be poorer, less educated, more rural, and specialize in job occupation. He argues that they tended to differ in cultural and political terms, and that their accents serve as an ethnic marker.

Upon White Southerners Jimmy Carter and Bill Clinton being elected to the U.S. presidency during the late 20th century, it symbolized generations of change from an Old South to New South society. Journalist Hodding Carter and State Department spokesperson during the Carter administration stated: "The thing about the South is that it's finally multiple rather than singular in almost every respect." The transition from President Carter to President Clinton also mirrored the social and economic evolution of the South in the mid-to-late 20th century.

White Southern diaspora populations exist in Brazil and Belize, known respectively as the Confederados and Confederate Belizeans.

== History ==
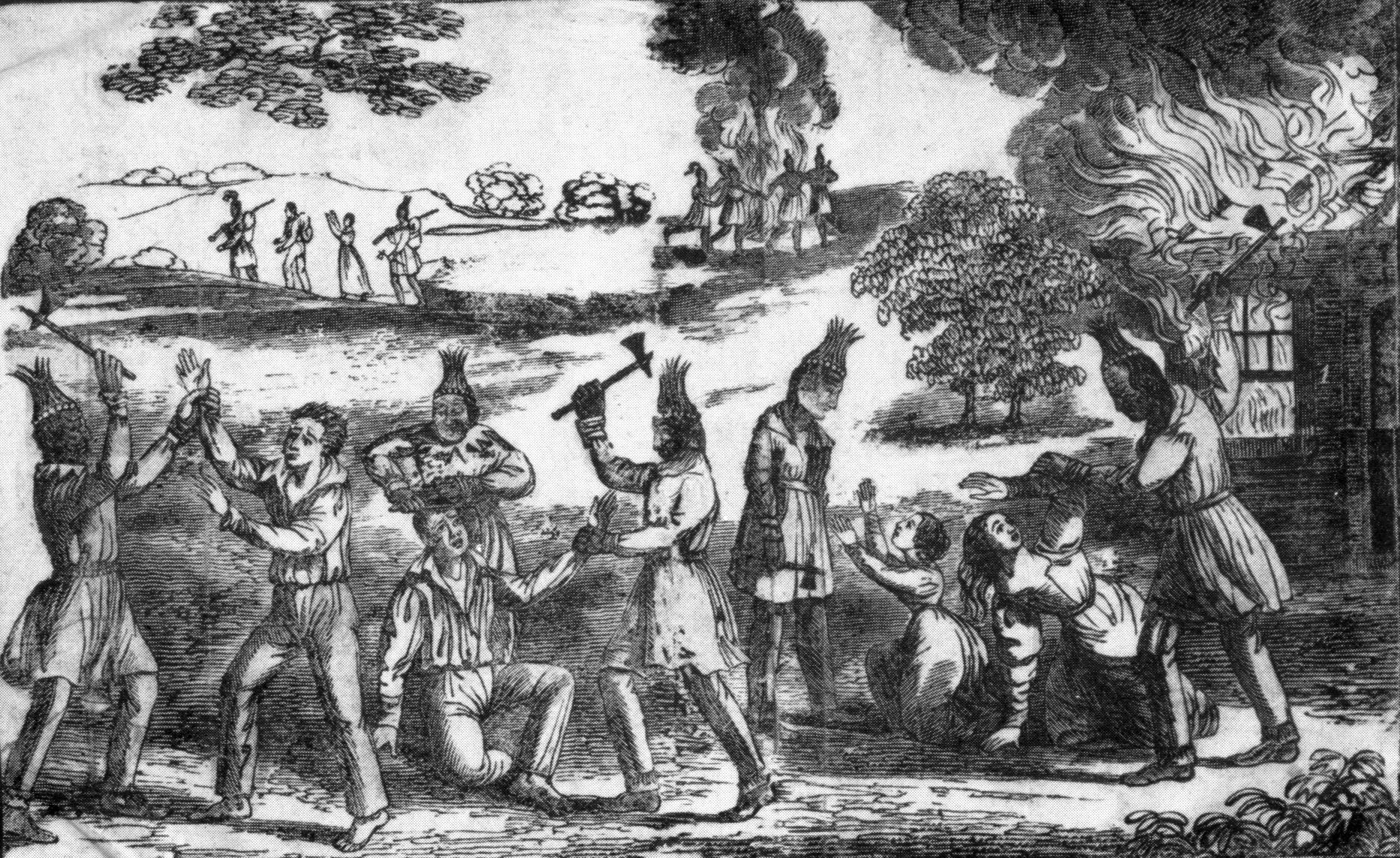
Fictional massacres depicted in An Authentic Narrative of the Seminole War.

The Spanish were the first Europeans to explore the Southern United States and to contact Native Americans in the region. Juan Ponce de León discovered Florida. Hernando de Soto explored Georgia, Alabama, Mississippi and Arkansas.

Before European colonization, The Southern United States was originally inhabited by various Native American tribes. Europeans had wiped out their population by giving them diseases. During the early 1800s, Native Americans were forcibly displaced as part of a brutal initiative aimed at clearing land for white settlers. The introduction of Spanish and French explorers in the 1500s marked the onset of European influences and the marked the beginning of white settlement in the South, and subsequently, the establishment of the United States of America placed Native Americans in direct opposition to an increasing number of white settlers. By the early 1800s, the Indian Removal Act presented a harrowing dilemma for most tribes: either assimilate into white culture or migrate westward into an uncertain future. Under the leadership of president Andrew Jackson, the notorious Trail of Tears resulted in the forced removal of thousands of Native Americans from the South to Indian Territory, which is now known as Oklahoma.

The Plantations of Ireland took place before and during the earliest British colonization of the Americas, and a group known as the West Country Men were involved in both Irish and American colonization.

Spain, England and France colonized the region.

The concept of a "white" identity was established both legally and socially in 17th-century colonial Virginia, especially after Bacon's Rebellion in 1676. This was used by the elite as a "divide and conquer" tactic to separate poor Europeans from enslaved African Americans. The term "white" originated in the South to differentiate Europeans from enslaved Black people.

Approximately 385,000 white individuals possessed African American slaves. During the period of slavery, it was common for white men to sexually assault black women.

=== Southern states ===
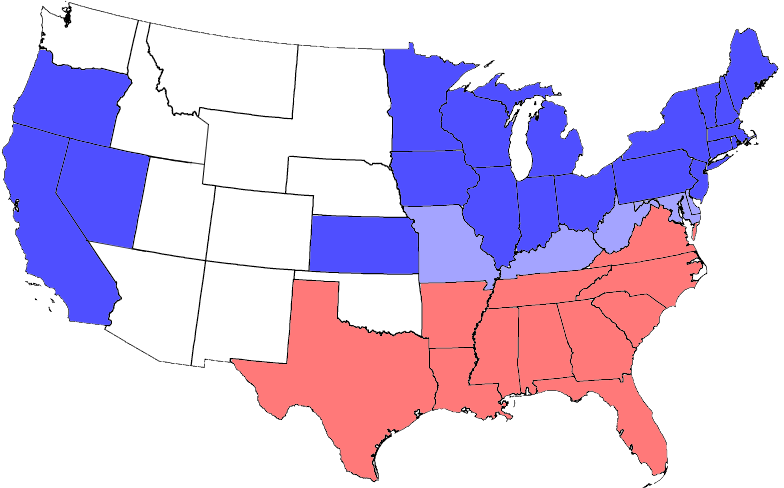
Map of the division of the states during the Civil War. Blue represents Union states, including those admitted during the war; light blue represents southern border states; red represents Confederate states. Unshaded areas were not states before or during the Civil War.

The Southern United States is not a geographical monolith. The South consists of several geographical regions, including the Deep South, the Upland South, and the Border states. Texas and Florida also have significant Hispanic influence, from being formerly part of Mexico and Spain, respectively.

- Deep South: Various definitions, usually includes Alabama, Georgia, Louisiana, Mississippi, and South Carolina.
- Upland South: Usually includes Kentucky, Virginia, West Virginia, Tennessee, North Carolina and on rare occasions Missouri, Maryland, and Delaware.
- Border states: Includes Missouri, Kentucky, Maryland, Delaware and West Virginia. These were southern slave states on or near the border of the Confederacy that did not secede or only partially seceded from the U.S. in the 1860s.

In particular, the border states of the Upper South have geographic, social, political, and economic connections to both the North and South. They are still considered to delineate the cultural border between the North and South, with the Ohio River being an important boundary between them.

== Historical identity ==
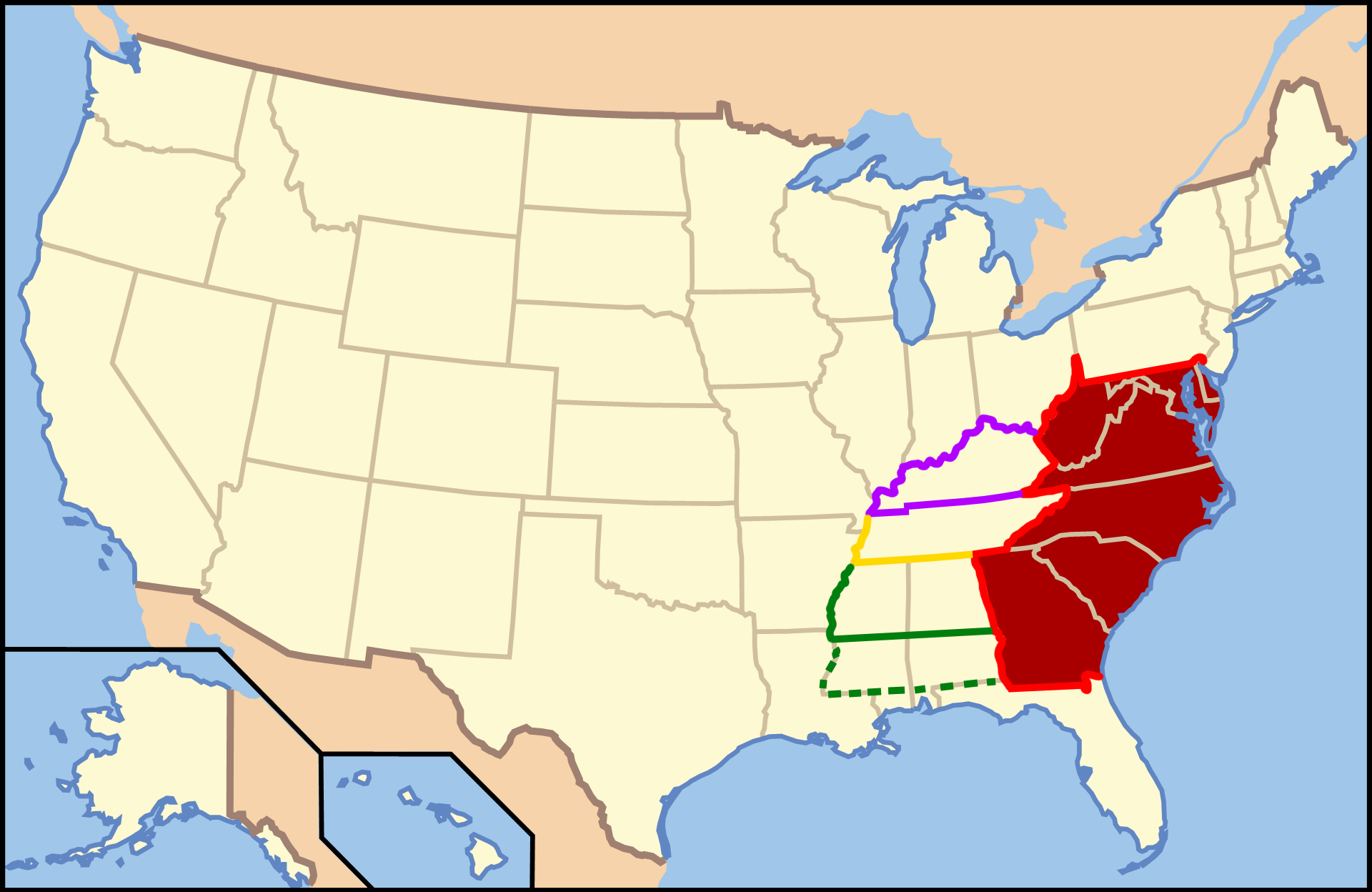
Geographically, the states shown in dark red comprise the Old South, that is the original southern states. Their modern boundaries differ from the boundaries when a part of the Thirteen Colonies. The borders are shown on the map.

Battle flag of the Confederate States, used as a symbol of White Southerners

The politics and economy of the South were historically dominated by a small rural elite. When looked at broadly, studies have shown that Southerners tend to be more conservative than most non-Southerners, with liberalism being mostly predominant in places with a Black majority or urban areas in the South.

=== Origins ===
The predominant culture of the original Southern states was English, particularly from South East England, South West England and the West Midlands. In the 17th century, most voluntary immigrants were of English origin and settled chiefly along the eastern coast, but had pushed as far inland as the Appalachian Mountains by the 18th century. The majority of early English settlers were indentured servants, who gained freedom after working off their passage. The wealthier men, typically members of the English landed gentry, who paid their way received land grants known as headrights to encourage settlement.

==== Landed gentry ====
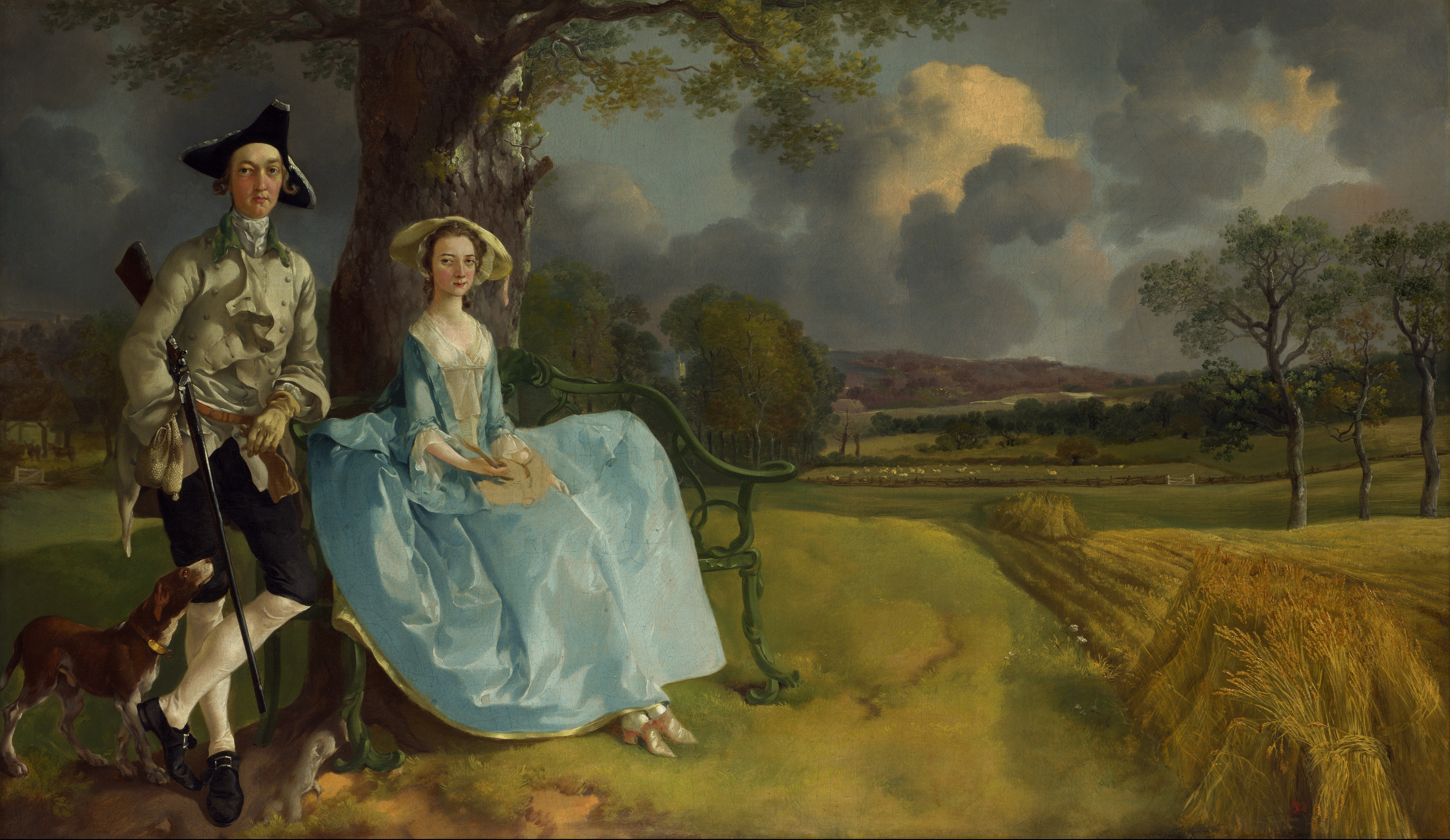
Mr and Mrs Andrews (c. 1750) by Thomas Gainsborough, a couple from the landed gentry, a marriage alliance between two local landowning families – one gentry, one trade. National Gallery, London.

During the colonial era, the British upper classes consisted of two sometimes overlapping entities, the peerage and landed gentry. In the British peerage, only the senior family member (typically the eldest son) inherited a substantive title (duke, marquess, earl, viscount, baron); these are referred to as peers or lords. The rest of the nobility form part of the landed gentry (abbreviated "gentry").

The landed gentry was a traditional British social class consisting of gentlemen in the original sense; that is, those who owned land in the form of country estates to such an extent that they were not required to actively work, except in an administrative capacity on their own lands. The estates were often (but not always) worked by tenant farmers, in which case the gentleman could live entirely off rent income. Gentlemen, ranking above yeomen, formed the lowest rank of British nobility.

William Berkeley, who served as the governor of Virginia from 1660 to 1677, instituted a "Second Sons" policy, in which younger sons of the British nobility were recruited to emigrate to Virginia. Berkeley also emphasized the headright system, the offering of large tracts of land to those arriving in the colony. This early immigration by an elite contributed to the development of an aristocratic political and social structure in the South.

According to historian G. E. Mingay, the gentry were landowners whose wealth "made possible a certain kind of education, a standard of comfort, and a degree of leisure and a common interest in ways of spending it". Leisure distinguished gentry from businessmen who gained their wealth through work. From the late 16th-century, the gentry emerged as the class most closely involved in politics, the military and law.

==== Instituting slavery ====
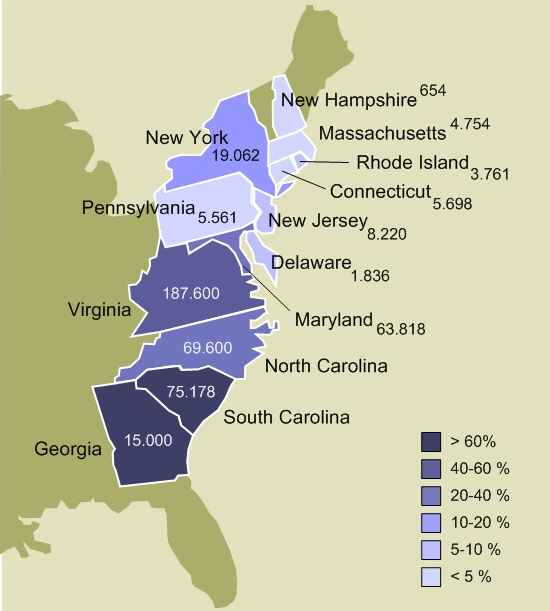
A map of the Thirteen Colonies in 1770, showing the number and proportion of slaves in each colony

According to Bertram Wyatt-Brown, "Bondage was an answer to an economic need. The South was not founded to create slavery; slavery was recruited to perpetuate the South." Between one-half and two-thirds of European immigrants to the Thirteen Colonies between the 1630s and the American Revolution came as indentured servants. However, while more than half the European immigrants to the Thirteen Colonies were indentured servants, at any one time they were outnumbered by workers who had never been indentured, or whose indenture had expired. Thus free wage labor was the most prevalent for Europeans in the colonies.

Indentured servitude began its decline after Bacon's Rebellion (1676-1677), a servant uprising against the government of Colonial Virginia. This was due to multiple factors, such as the treatment of servants, support of native tribes in the surrounding area, a refusal to expand the amount of land an indentured servant could work by the colonial government, and inequality between the upper and lower class in colonial society. Edmund S. Morgan's 1975 classic, American Slavery, American Freedom: The Ordeal of Colonial Virginia, connected the threat of Bacon's Rebellion, namely the potential for lower-class revolt, with the Colony of Virginia's transition over to slavery, saying, "But for those with eyes to see, there was an obvious lesson in the rebellion. Resentment of an alien race might be more powerful than resentment of an upper class. Virginians did not immediately grasp it. It would sink in as time went on." In the Chesapeake and Province of North Carolina, tobacco constituted a major percentage of the total agricultural output.

The Deep South was dominated by cotton and rice plantations, originating with the colony of South Carolina, which was settled by a planter class who initially migrated from the British Caribbean island of Barbados. The Barbados Slave Code of 1661 was used as a model to control and terrorize the African American slave population. The first European colonists in the Province of Carolina, before it was split, introduced African slavery into the colony in 1670, the year the colony was founded. Charleston, South Carolina ultimately became the busiest slave port in North America.

==== Cultural differences ====
An animation showing the free/slave status of U.S. states and territories, 1789–1861

In 1765, London philanthropist Dr. John Fothergill remarked on the cultural differences of the British American colonies southward from Maryland and those to the north, suggesting that the Southerners were marked by "idleness and extravagance". Fothergill suggested that Southerners were more similar to the people of the Caribbean than to the colonies to the north. J. Hector St. John de Crèvecœur's 1782 Letters from an American Farmer described Charleston, South Carolina slaveholders as having "all that life affords most bewitching and pleasurable, without labour, without fatigue, hardly subjected to the trouble of wishing." Crèvecœur sought to portray Southerners as stuck in the social, cultural and economic remnants of colonialism, in contrast to the Northerners whom he considered to be representative of the distinctive culture of the new nation. All of the states north of Maryland passed laws to gradually or immediately abolish slavery between 1777 and 1804.

Early in United States history, the contrasting characteristics of Southern states were acknowledged in a discussion between Thomas Jefferson and François-Jean de Chastellux. Jefferson ascribed the Southerners' "unsteady", "generous", "candid" traits to their climate, while De Chastellux claimed that Southerners' "indelible character which every nation acquires at the moment of its origin" would "always be aristocratic" not only because of slavery but also "vanity and sloth". A visiting French dignitary in 1810 contrasted the "bold and enterprising" residents of the northern states with the "heedless and lazy" people of the South and observed that American customs seemed "entirely changed" over the Potomac River, with Southern society resembling those of the Caribbean.

Northern popular press and literature in this early period of US history often used a "we"-versus-"they" dichotomy when discussing Southerners, and looked upon Southern customs as backward and a threat to progress. For instance, a 1791 article in the New York Magazine warned that the spread of Southern cockfighting was tantamount to being "assaulted" by "the enemy within" and would "rob" the nation's "honor".

==== Religion ====
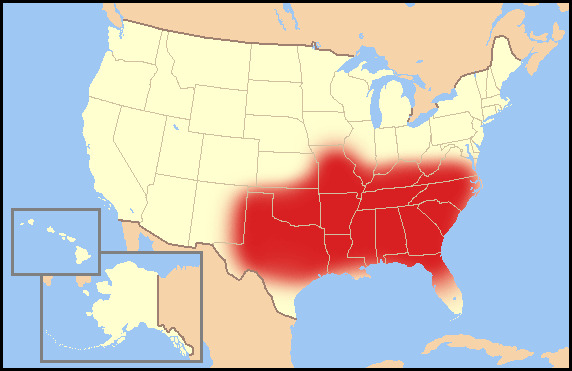
Approximate boundaries of the Bible Belt

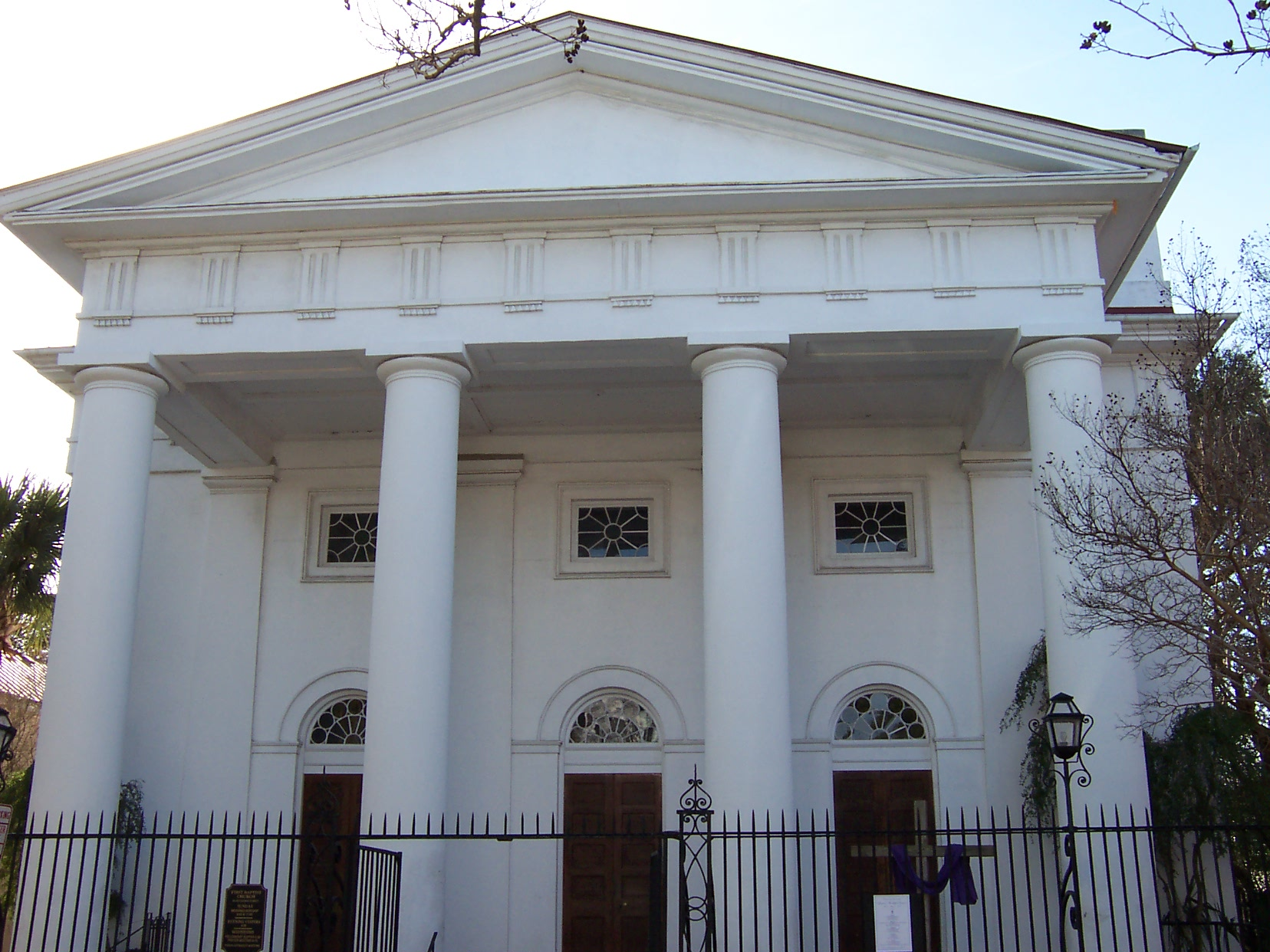
First Baptist Church in Charleston, South Carolina

Most of the Southern United States is known as the "Bible Belt", because of the prevalence of evangelical Protestantism. Except in Acadiana in Louisiana, Catholicism is almost entirely absent among White Southerners.

During the colonial period (1607–1776), the South was a stronghold of the Anglican church. Its transition to a stronghold of evangelical Protestantism occurred gradually over the next century as a series of religious revival movements, many associated with the Baptist denomination, gained great popularity in the region.

In the colonial period and early 19th century, the First Great Awakening and the Second Great Awakening transformed Southern religion. The evangelical religion was spread by religious revivals led by local lay Baptist ministers or itinerant Methodist ministers. They fashioned the nation's "Bible Belt." In the early decades of the 18th century, the Baptists in the South reduced their challenge to class and race. Rather than pressing for freedom for slaves, they encouraged planters to improve treatment of them, and ultimately used the Bible to justify slavery.

In 1845, the Southern Baptist Convention separated from other regions. By the beginning of the Civil War, the Baptist and Methodist churches had attracted the most members in the South, and their churches were most numerous in the region.

In general, the inland regions of the Deep South and Upper South, such as Arkansas, Tennessee, Mississippi, and Alabama were less attractive to immigrants and have stronger concentrations of Baptists, Methodists, Churches of Christ and other Protestant fellowships.

=== Latino influence ===
Texas was once part of Mexico, and Florida was once part of Spain. Both became states of the United States in part to protect slavery.

- Specifically, Mexico conditionally abolished slavery in Texas, so Texas revolted and won independence to keep slavery legal in the state.
- Florida was a refuge for escaped slaves, who were protected by the Seminole people. The United States, seeking to re-enslave escaped slaves and expand its territorial control, launched military incursions into Spanish Florida that became known as the First Seminole War. Following the US acquisition of Florida in 1821, the conflict continued as a multi-decade struggle over both slavery and the forced removal of the Seminole people from their lands, spanning what are known as the Second and Third Seminole Wars.

At the time of the American Civil War, Florida and Texas were sparsely populated and not fully settled, with Florida and Texas being the least-populated and third least-populated of the 11 Confederate states per the 1860 United States census, respectively.

African slavery was practiced in parts of Latin America. Two Latin American countries, Brazil and Cuba, did not abolish slavery until the 1880s, and to this day have significant Black populations.

- Brazil passively supported the Confederacy, and some former Confederate officials fled to Brazil, and are known as Confederados.
- Cuba is near Florida, and remained part of Spain until the Spanish-American War. It had covertly trafficked slaves to the Confederacy before the Civil War, and also passively supported the Confederacy.

=== Antebellum era ===
Map of the United States c. 1849 (modern state borders), with the parallel 36°30′ north—slave states in red, free states in blue

The War of 1812 brought increasing awareness to the differences between Northerners and Southerners, who had opposed and supported the war respectively. The Panic of 1819 and the 1820 admission of Missouri as a slave state also exacerbated the North–South divide. In 1823, New York activist Gerrit Smith commented that there was an almost "national difference of character between the people of the Northern and the people of the Southern states." Similarly, a 1822 commentary in the North American Review suggested that Southerners were "a different race of men", "highminded and vainglorious" people who lived on the plantations. Political disputes surrounding foreign policy, slavery and tariffs weakened the notion of an all-Union ideological identity which Southern writers had been promoting for the first thirty years after independence. Due to migration in the South itself, the notion of the South as a unified, distinctive political-economic entity began to replace the more specific local divisions between Easterners and Westerners/plantation-versus-backwoods in the years following the War of 1812, culminating in the Southern literature of William Gilmore Simms. It was only in this generation's youth that the United States as a whole began shifting to a postcolonial society with new vehicles for collective identity; in their adulthood they helped define and historicize the South.

=== Civil War and Reconstruction ===
With secession and the creation of the Confederacy, Southern writers argued that it represented a new Southern nationality. New Orleans publisher J. D. B. De Bow wrote that secession was not based on slavery, but rather on "two separate nations" that were racially distinct, Southerners being descended from Norman cavaliers, Huguenots, Jacobites and other "Mediterranean races" linked to the Romans, while Northerners were descended from Anglo-Saxon serfs and other Germanic immigrants. The term "Yankee" described a race "calculating, money worshipping, cowardly" or even as "hordes" and "semi-barbarian." This Norman ancestry explained their attachment to the institution of slavery, as opposed to the Northerners who were descendants of a "slave race".

A geography textbook explained that the Yankees were a "keen, thrifty, speculating" people; money loving and moneymaking, without much restraint as to means, success being the all-absorbing object. Another writer said that Yankees were descended from Puritans who "were in their hearts tyrants" and were "bigoted, intolerant and persecuting", while the Southerners had "Norman roots." A history book on the Confederacy said that the South had to "assert its well-known superiority in civilization over the people of the North."

Union Secretary of the Navy Gideon Welles and German-American political scientist Francis Lieber, who condemned the Southerners' belief in their distinct ancestry, attributed the Civil War's outbreak to that belief.

Southerners developed their ideas on nationalism on influences from the nationalist movements growing in Europe (such as the works of Johann Gottfried Herder and the constructed north–south divide between Germanic peoples and Italians). Southern ideologues, fearful of mass politics, sought to adopt the ethnic themes of the revolutions of 1848 while distancing themselves from the revolutionaries' radical liberal ideas. The slaveholding elite encouraged Romantic "antimodern" narratives of Southern culture as a refuge of traditional community hospitality and chivalry to mobilise popular support from non-slaveholding White Southerners, promising to bring the South through a form of technological and economic progress without the perceived social ills of modern industrial societies.

While Confederate Secretary of State Judah P. Benjamin declared that "the North must exterminate us or agree to separation", Southern nationality did not survive the end of the war. Rather than be a conquered people, Southerners quickly resumed their old allegiance.

James Longstreet, who had fought at Gettysburg, was appointed U.S. Surveyor of Customs in New Orleans in 1868.

Henry S. Foote, who had served in the Confederate Congress, was appointed superintendent of the United States mint in New Orleans in 1878.

Lucius Quintus Cincinnatus Lamar had been the Confederate envoy to Russia in 1863, but returned to the U.S. House of Representatives in 1873, became Secretary of the Interior in 1885 and was nominated to the Supreme Court in 1887.

Benjamin himself fled to England and never returned.

In the eleven states that seceded from the United States in 1860–61 to form the Confederacy, 31% of families held at least one African American in slavery, which includes the territory that split from Virginia to become West Virginia. The four border states that did not secede also permitted slavery.

=== Poor Whites ===
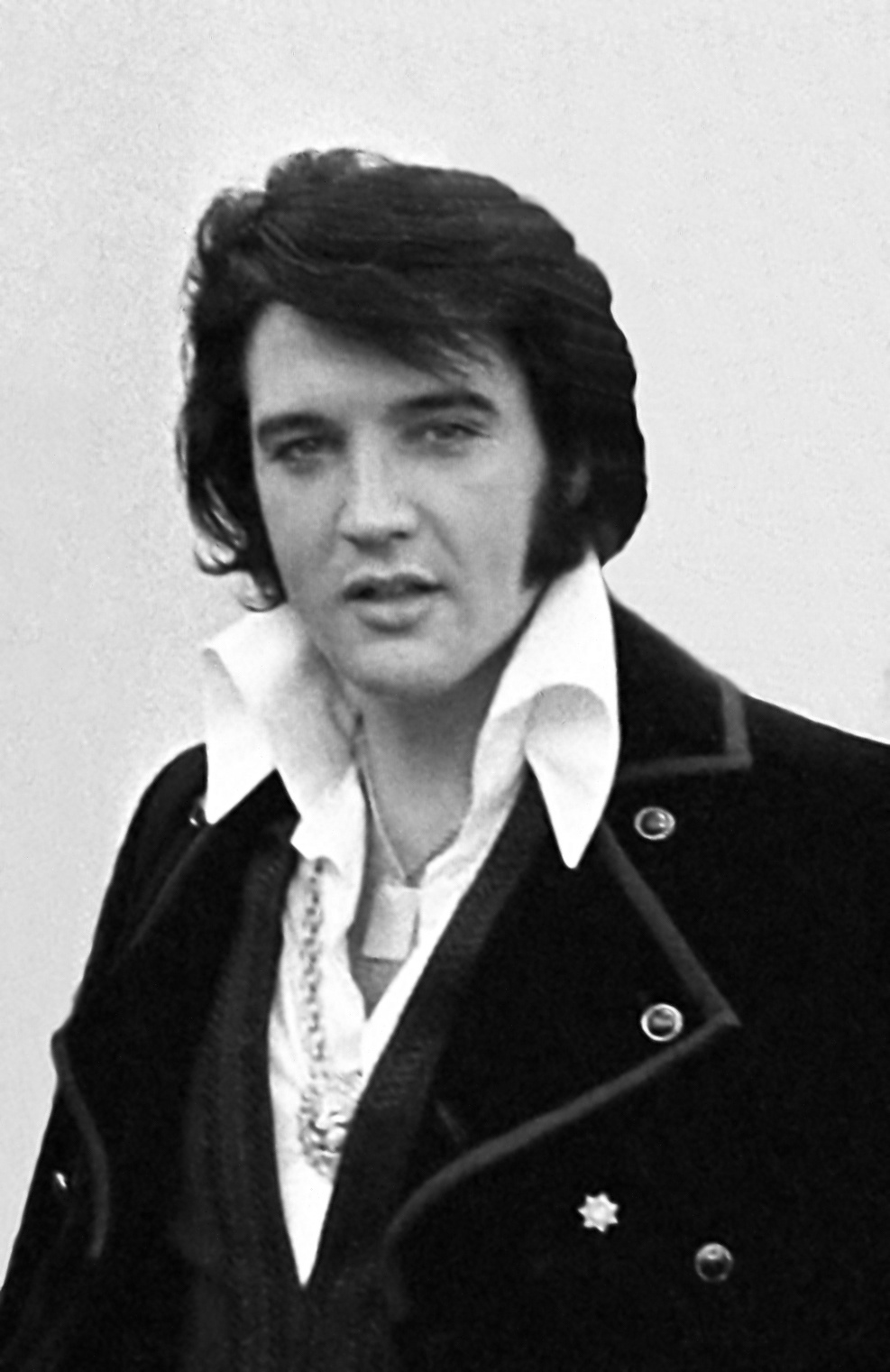
Elvis Presley, an icon of 20th century United States, was born into a Poor White family in Tupelo, Mississippi.

Slavery was less common in the Upland South, comprising the areas in the South outside the Atlantic Plain, which remains heavily white to this day. Northern English, Scots lowlanders and Ulster-Scots (later called the Scotch-Irish) settled in Appalachia in the 18th century, and eventually spread westward into the Ozarks and Texas Hill Country. The early settlers of the Ohio Valley were mainly Upland Southerners.

As independent small farmers living on the harsh American frontier, poor whites had starkly different interests than those of White Southerners that lived on commercial plantations or in large cities. Poor whites were often isolated from the rest of Southern society and civilization during the Antebellum South, with few owning slaves, and many were more likely to be critical of slavery.

During the American Civil War, some regions of the Upland South such as West Virginia and East Tennessee remained loyal to the Union. East Tennessee's Republican leanings are rooted in its antebellum Whig sentiments, with historian O.P. Temple tracing this sentiment back to the anti-aristocratic Covenanters of Scotland.

During the nadir of American race relations at the turn of the 20th century, intense violence and white supremacy flourished in a region suffering from a lack of public education and competition for resources. Southern politicians of the day built on conflict between poor whites and African Americans in a form of political opportunism. As John T. Campbell summarizes in The Broad Ax in 1906, the Civil War also caused poor whites to experience intense dire economic conditions and were brought into poverty along with enslaved African-Americans.

In the past, white men have hated white men quite as much as some of them hate the Negro, and have vented their hatred with as much savagery as they ever have against the Negro. The best educated people have the least race prejudice. In the United States the poor white were encouraged to hate the Negroes because they could then be used to help hold the Negroes in slavery. The Negroes were taught to show contempt for the poor white because this would increase the hatred between them and each side could be used by the master to control the other. The real interest of the poor whites and the Negroes were the same, that of resisting the oppression of the master class. But ignorance stood in the way. This race hatred was at first used to perpetuate white supremacy in politics in the South. The poor whites are almost injured by it as are the Negroes.

== Recent studies ==
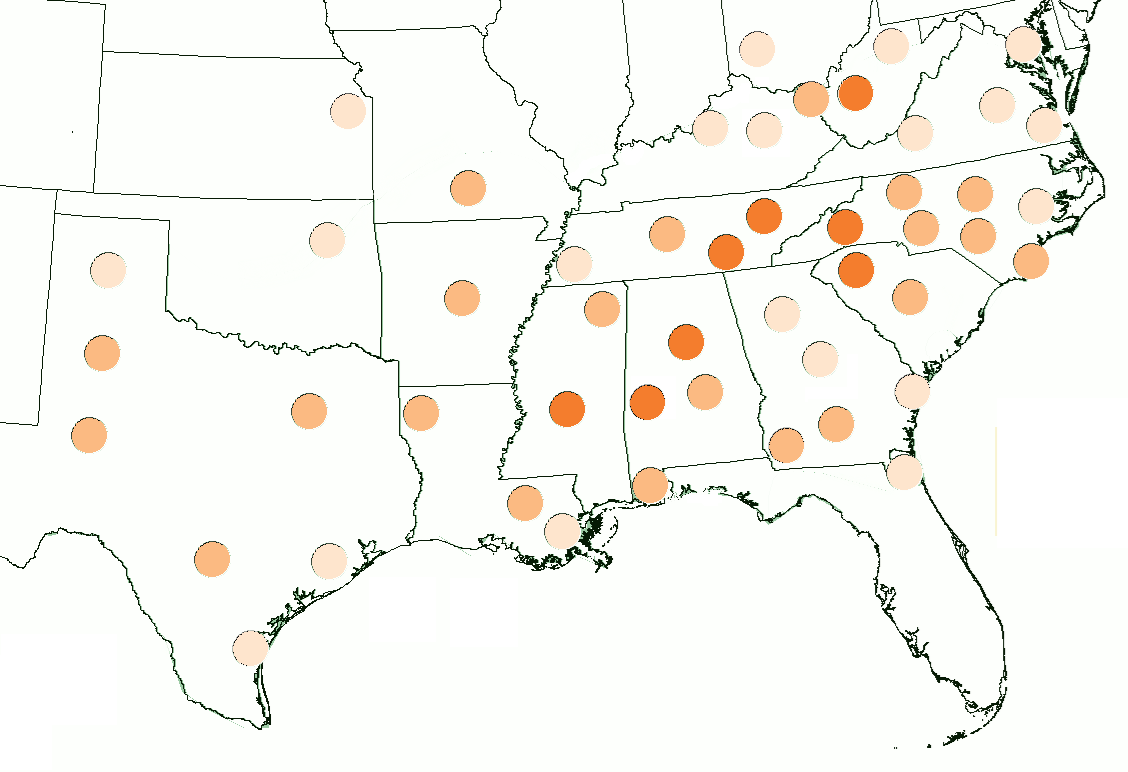
The approximate extent of Southern American English, based upon The Atlas of North American English

According to a 2014 study, about 10% of self-identified White Southerners have >1% African ancestry, compared to 3.5% of White Americans in general.

Sociologist William L. Smith argues that "regional identity and ethnic identity are often intertwined in a variety of interesting ways such that some scholars have viewed white southerners as an ethnic group". In her book Southern Women, Caroline Matheny Dillman also documents a number of authors who posit that Southerners might constitute an ethnic group. She notes that the historian George Brown Tindall analyzed the persistence of the distinctiveness of Southern culture in The Ethnic Southerners (1976), "and referred to the South as a subculture, pointing out its ethnic and regional identity". The 1977 book The Ethnic Imperative, by Howard F. Stein and Robert F. Hill, "viewed Southerners as a special kind of white ethnicity". Dillman notes that these authors, and earlier work by John Shelton Reed, all refer to the earlier work of Lewis Killian, whose White Southerners, first published in 1970, introduced "the idea that Southerners can be viewed as an American ethnic group". Killian does however note, that: "Whatever claims to ethnicity or minority status ardent 'Southernists' may have advanced, white southerners are not counted as such in official enumerations".

Precursors to Killian include sociologist Erdman Beynon, who in 1938 made the observation that "there appears to be an emergent group consciousness among the southern white laborers", and economist Stuart Jamieson, who argued four years later in 1942 that Oklahomans, Arkansans and Texans who were living in the valleys of California were starting to take on the "appearance of a distinct 'ethnic group'". Beynon saw this group consciousness as deriving partly from the tendency of northerners to consider them as a homogeneous group, and Jamieson saw it as a response to the label "Okie". More recently, historian Clyde N. Wilson has argued that "In the North and West, White Southerners were treated as and understood themselves to be a distinct ethnic group, referred to negatively as 'hillbillies' and 'Okies'".

The Harvard Encyclopedia of American Ethnic Groups, published in 1980, includes a chapter on Southerners authored by John Shelton Reed, alongside chapters by other contributors on Appalachians and Yankees. Writing in the journal Ethnic and Racial Studies, social anthropologist M. G. Smith argued that the entries do not satisfactorily indicate how these groups meet the criteria of ethnicity, and so justify inclusion in the encyclopedia. Historian David L. Carlton, argues that Killian, Reed and Tindall's "ethnic approach does provide a way to understand the South as part of a vast, patchwork America, the components of which have been loath to allow their particularities to be eaten away by the corrosions of a liberal-capitalist order", nonetheless notes problems with the approach. He argues that the South is home to two ethnic communities (white and black) as well as smaller, growing ethnic groups, not just one. He argues that: "Most important, though, and most troubling, is the peculiar relationship of white southerners to the nation's history." The view of the average White Southerner, Carlton argues, is that they are quintessential Americans, and their nationalism equates "America" with the South.

== See also ==
- Mountain white – White settlers of the rural Appalachian Mountains in the United States
- Poor White, a sociocultural group
- Redneck
- Hillbilly
- Black Southerners – African Americans living in the Southern United States
- History of the Jews in the Southern United States
- Spanish-Portuguese Jews in the United States
