= African-American jeremiad =

African-American literary form

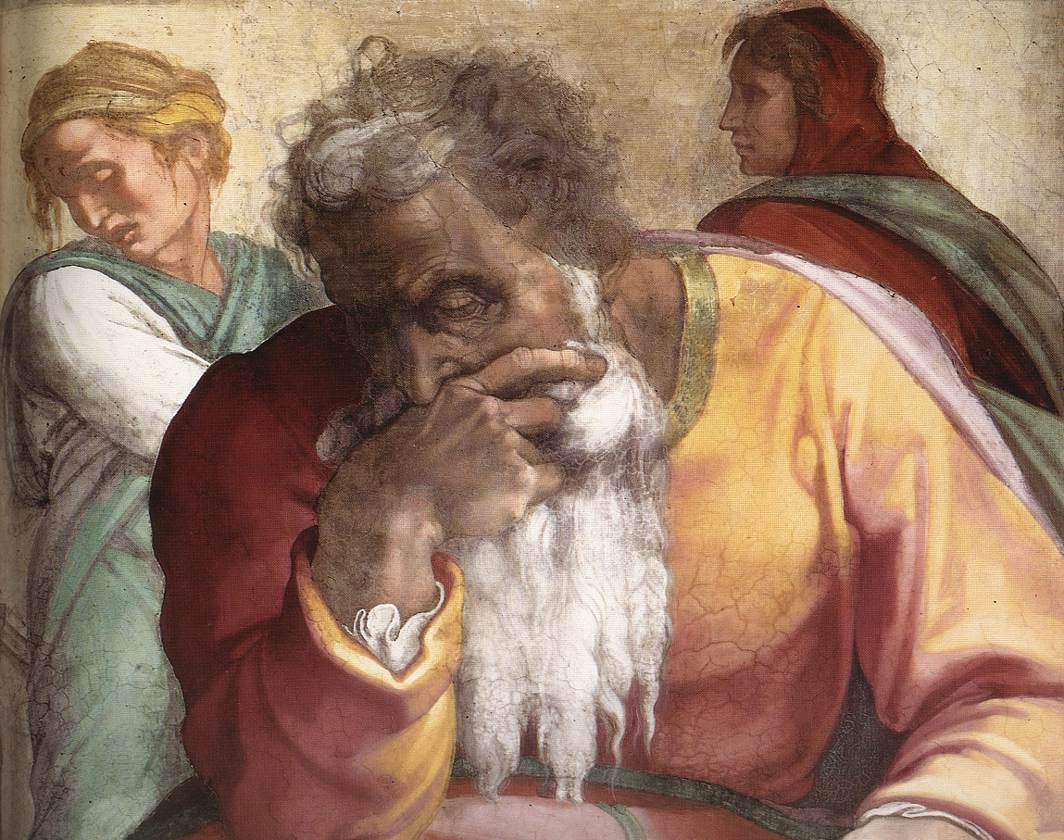
The biblical prophet Jeremiah, as portrayed by Michelangelo

The African-American jeremiad is a variant of the jeremiad literary form consisting of three parts in order: promise, failure, and prophecy. Although the African-American jeremiad has been long familiar within the African-American community, broader recognition of this literary form provides a useful tool for rhetorical criticism/analysis.

The jeremiad has been documented since the time of the biblical prophet Jeremiah; its uses have been both religious and sociopolitical. Scholars first traced an American jeremiad starting with the Puritans advocating for freedom from England’s oppression. Later scholars identified a distinct African-American or Black jeremiad that adapted the form to criticize slavery and discrimination and advocate for sociopolitical change.

== Structure ==
The African-American jeremiad follows a three-part structure:

1. Promise. The jeremiad begins by quoting promises of freedom and equality from famous founding documents such as the Bible, The Declaration of Independence, the Constitution, and/or the Emancipation Proclamation.
2. Failure. The second part of the jeremiad, often the longest, not only enumerates how the United States has failed those promises through slavery, oppression, and discrimination, but it also typically contains strongly worded warnings about what will happen if America does not change and uphold freedom and equality for all.
3. Prophecy. The third part of the jeremiad turns from pessimism toward hope, proclaiming that if America changes to fulfill the promises in the founding documents, then peace and happiness will flourish. Often, biblical passages and/or patriotic songs are recited or sung in this final section.

== Scholarly progression ==
Dr. Sacvan Bercovitch wrote a seminal work on an American jeremiad but did not distinguish an African-American expression. Dr. Wilson Moses then argued for a specific "Black jeremiad" variant but thought it ended at the Civil War. Dr. Howard-Pitney expanded the argument, stating that the African-American jeremiad continued through to the civil rights era, up until the present day, and he provided broad analyses of the rhetoric of civil rights leaders in the context of the jeremiad.

Building on those foundations, various scholars have begun applying the jeremiad structure understanding to rhetorical analyses of specific works. For example, Dr. Willie Harrell argues for inclusion of examples from the earliest days of the United States. Additionally, Dr. Elizabeth Vander Lei and Dr. Keith Miller examine specific works from the civil rights era in more detail, and Dr. Rachel Johnson and Sarah Kornfield examine a recent poetry recitation.

Scholars differ on whether the African-American jeremiad argues for African Americans to become part of the American consensus or in favor of black nationalism. And still other scholars argue that the usage is more complex yet—that the jeremiad structure is used in multiple ways, sometimes in the same work.

== Rhetorical analysis examples ==
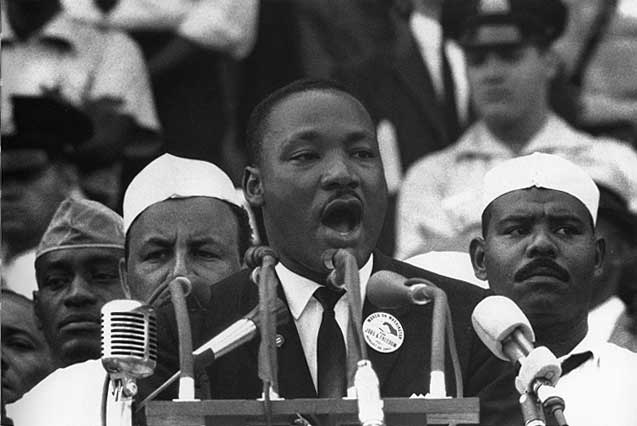
Dr. Martin Luther King, Jr., "I Have a Dream" speech, August 28, 1963

Many African-American leaders are characterized by the African-American jeremiad principles in their work in general, but the following examples of specific works help illustrate the usefulness of the African-American jeremiad form as a tool for rhetorical analysis:

- Caesar Sarter. In 1774, Caesar Sarter published an antislavery essay in the Essex Journal and Merrimack Packet that juxtaposes colonial appeals to liberty with the continued enslavement of Africans, calling on Massachusetts lawmakers to redeem American ideals through abolition.
- Russell Parrott. In 1814, Mr. Parrott wrote “An Oration on the Abolition of the Slave Trade,” following the jeremiad tradition by challenging white supremacy and arguing for civil rights for all people in the United States so it can “become a great nation.”
- David Walker. In 1829, David Walker published a book: Appeal to the Coloured Citizens of the World. Walker’s use of the jeremiad in calling for slave revolt used harsh language but urged action on both sides—for whites to stop slavery and for African-Americans to act. In fact, the Appeal both invoked American values and rejected them. This speech is probably the most well-known example of the African-American jeremiad prior to the Civil War.
- Frederick Douglass. In 1852, Frederick Douglass gave his famous “What to the Slave is the Fourth of July?” speech. This speech, arranged in a jeremiad form, included a long tribute to the founders, “underscore[d] American hypocrisy by piling on excruciating examples of slaveholders’ cruelty,” and then ended with a vision of a “racially integrated American society.” Dr. Andrew Murphy stated that: “If any thinker bridged the African-American and white jeremiads, it was certainly Frederick Douglass.”
- W.E.B Du Bois. In 1903, W.E.B Du Bois published The Souls of Black Folk: Essays and Sketches. Dr. Jonathan Kahn argues that these sketches are also in the tradition of the African-American jeremiad but also see a pluralistic whole rather than a sameness.
- Dr. Martin Luther King, Jr. In 1963, Dr. King gave what was arguably his most famous speech, “I Have a Dream,” which introduced the African-American jeremiad to the American people at large because it was the first televised. On the steps of the Lincoln Memorial, Dr. King used that setting to give shortened forms of both the promise and failure and spent most of the speech describing the vision of what America could be. Scholars state that one can really only appreciate its rhetorical impact by considering as an African-American jeremiad performed at a “ceremonial protest.” In this speech, King “skillfully blends an endorsement of fundamental American ideals with a lament over the realities of American life.”
- Amanda Gorman. At the 2021 inauguration, Ms. Gorman recited her poem “The Hill We Climb.” Scholars argue that this performance was in the Black jeremiad tradition but updated to “envision a unity without sameness."
