= Caesar Sarter =

African-American essayist of 'Essay on Slavery' (1774)

Caesar Sarter (c. 1745 – after 1774) was a formerly enslaved African-born man who lived in Newburyport, Massachusetts, and an early Black abolitionist writer in colonial America. He is known for a single antislavery essay "Essay on Slavery" published in 1774, in which he challenged American colonists to confront the contradiction between their calls for political liberty and their continued practice of slavery.

== Life ==
Little is known about Sarter's life beyond what can be inferred from his 1774 essay. He stated that he was born free in Africa and, while young, was "trapanned" (kidnapped or deceitfully seized) and forcibly transported to North America, where he was enslaved for over twenty years. He later purchased his freedom, writing that "at last, by the blessing of God," he had "shaken it off."

At the time of his essay's publication, Sarter lived in Newburyport, a major shipbuilding and maritime center in the 1770s. He mentioned that eleven of his relatives remained enslaved.

The surname "Sarter" may have been taken from a former enslaver, though no records definitively connect him to a family of that name in the Newburyport area. Some historians have suggested it may have been a pseudonym, or that he had been enslaved elsewhere before settling in Massachusetts as a free man.

=== Antislavery essay (1774) ===
On August 17, 1774, the Essex Journal and Merrimack Packet, sometimes referred to as The Massachusetts and New-Hampshire General Advertiser, published Sarter's essay, often referred to as "Essay on Slavery." The piece appeared on the newspaper's front page, eight months after the Boston Tea Party.

Addressed to the Massachusetts legislature, the essay adopts the form of a jeremiad, a rhetorical mode common in New England religious and political writing. Sarter condemned slavery as morally indefensible and directly challenged white colonists who demanded liberty from British oppression while holding enslaved people in their own households. He wrote:

"I need not point out the absurdity of your exertions for liberty while you have slaves in your houses."

Sarter grounded his argument in Christian theology, particularly the Golden Rule, urging lawmakers to apply the same moral standards to enslaved Africans that they claimed for themselves:

"Why will you not pity and relieve the poor, distressed, enslaved Africans? Let that excellent rule given by our Saviour, to do to others as you would that they should do to you, have its due weight with you."

In addition to religious appeals, Sarter drew on natural rights arguments similar to those advanced by American revolutionaries, repeatedly paralleling colonial resistance to British tyranny with the condition of enslaved Africans.

== Historical significance ==
Sarter is one of several formerly enslaved Black writers who emerged in the years immediately preceding the American Revolution to publicly contest slavery in New England. His essay represents an early and explicit articulation of the charge of revolutionary hypocrisy, a theme that would recur throughout Black abolitionist thought in the late eighteenth and nineteenth centuries.

Because no other writings by or about Sarter are known to survive, his broader life and activities remain largely undocumented.

Sarter's 1774 essay has been cited by historians as an example of early African American political thought and religiously grounded abolitionism. The essay is read by Samuel L. Jackson in Ken Burns's 2025 documentary series The American Revolution.

== See also ==
- African-American Jeremiad
