= The Legacy of Sacco and Vanzetti =

1948 book by G. Louis Joughin and Edmund M. Morgan

- Title page for The Legacy of Sacco and Vanzetti (1948)
- Author: G. Louis Joughin; Edmund M. Morgan
- Publisher: Harcourt, Brace and Company
- Publication date: 1948
- Pages: 598

The Legacy of Sacco and Vanzetti is a 1948 book by G. Louis Joughin and Edmund M. Morgan on the cultural impact of the Sacco and Vanzetti case.
