= First Church in Roxbury =

Church in Massachusetts, US

Coordinates: 42.329884°N 71.089590°W

The First Church in Roxbury
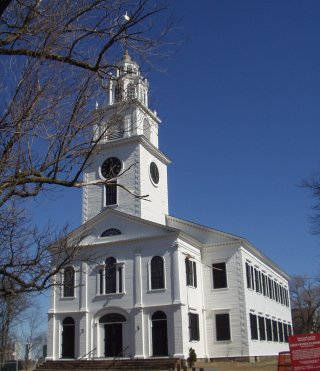
- The First Church in Roxbury, Modern Day

Religion
- Affiliation: Unitarian Universalist (currently); Congregational Church (originally)
- Status: Unitarian Universalist Urban Ministry Headquarters

Location
- Location: Roxbury, Boston, Massachusetts
- Interactive map of The First Church in Roxbury

Architecture
- Completed: 1632

The First Church in Roxbury, also known as the First Church of Roxbury, is the current headquarters of the Unitarian Universalist ("UU") Urban Ministry, located in Roxbury, Boston, Massachusetts, US. A church on this site has been in use since 1632 when early English settlers built the first meetinghouse. Since then, the meetinghouse has been rebuilt four times, and its appearance today reflects how the meetinghouse looked in the late 19th and early 20th centuries.

== History ==
=== The First Meeting House (1632–1674) ===
The First Church of Roxbury was the sixth church to be gathered by the early English settlers. In 1631, settlers living in Roxbury, who belonged to the Church of Dorchester, were finally self-sufficient and able to create their own church—the First Church of Roxbury. The "official" beginning of the church is recognized as when the first meeting house was constructed the next year. The first meetinghouse served as a central part of the community from 1632–1674. The first pastor, Reverend Thomas Weld, was ordained in July 1632 (and it is presumed that that is also when the Church's covenant, a document stated the congregation was officially recognized by the church, was signed). There is no definitive record of what the first meeting house looked like, but based on the construction of the time, it was likely a simple, small building with a thatched roof. The first meeting house served as a central location for the budding community in Roxbury, as the church was a central part of the early settlers lives (many of whom were fleeing to America for freedom from religious persecution). In August, 1645, the congregation decided to create the "Free Schoole in Roxburie" (now Roxbury Latin School). Samuel Danforth, the second pastor of the church, was ordained September 24, 1650.

==== John Eliot ====
John Eliot was ordained as the first teacher on November 5, 1632. Eliot, as a Puritan missionary became known by many as "the apostle to the Indians" for learning the Algonquin language (the Native American language spoken in the area at the time). He used this knowledge to translate the ten commandments, the Lord's prayer, and other scriptures into the Algonquin language, to try converting the natives to Puritan Christianity. Although unintentional, Eliot also introduced the concept of written language as the natives did not previously have a phonetic alphabet; they communicated primarily through spoken language with their written language being mainly pictorial images (such as Egyptian hieroglyphs).

=== The Second Meeting House (1674–1741) ===
Due to a growth in population in Roxbury, as well as the inclusion of residents of Muddy River, who had no place of worship of their own until 1717, in the congregation, a new meeting house was built for the church. The first meeting in this new meeting house took place on November 15, 1674. On October 17, 1688, Nehemiah Walter was ordained as a pastor. Previously, the meeting house was full of just seats, but the first pews are built sometime around 1693. In 1706, residents from "Jamaica End" (the westerly part of Roxbury) asked the general court for permission to be made their own precinct and for help with building their own meeting house, which was denied. However, in 1711 they again made the same request signed by thirty-two people, and the request was granted; eighteen members from The First Church in Roxbury were sent off to form The Second Church in Roxbury. Thomas Walter was ordained as a pastor on October 19, 1718. The population of Roxbury continued to grow and finally, in March, 1736, the congregation once again brought up the subject of building a new meeting house; however they were unsure whether to build it on the same spot or to pick a new location. Finally, it was decided that the new meeting house would be built slightly north, and that the old meeting house was to be demolished once the new one began construction.

=== The Third Meeting House (1741–1744) ===
Again due to growing population, a larger meeting house was necessary and in the summer of 1741, the third meeting house was completed; the first meeting was held in the new building on August 31, 1741. However, a fire broke out in February 1743 (or 1744), and destroyed the meeting house. The congregation worshipped in the brick schoolhouse until a new meeting house was built.

=== The Fourth Meeting House (1744–1803) ===
Following the destruction by fire, the fourth meeting house was built on the same location and of the same design as the former third meeting house and was completed in 1746. It continued to serve the congregation as it always had until the American Revolutionary War broke out.

==== The Siege of Boston ====
From March 29, 1775 (a few weeks before the Siege of Boston, the opening phase of the Revolutionary War, began) until April 8, 1776 (a few weeks after the Siege ended) there were no public meetings held in the meeting house. During the siege, no religious meetings could be held and the meeting house served as a signal station for the army. As such, it was also a target for British bombs, and by the time the British retreated from Boston in 1776, the meeting house had been damaged by bombs in several places. As a result of the war, the members of the parish were scattered, and until 1782 there was no official minister for the church.

==== Following the American Revolutionary War ====
Once the church named a new pastor in 1782, the church and meeting house largely went back to serving the community and congregation as it always had. Various efforts were made to restore the meeting house following the damage, and in 1787, a group of men who lived near the meeting house presented the church with a clock, which was placed on the bell tower. It was also around this time that the church began officially referring to itself as a parish, rather than a precinct. On May 27, 1799, the church voted against building a new meeting house. However, in 1802, another vote was taken and it was decided that measures should be taken to start building a new meeting house for the congregation. Three different plans were submitted, and after one was chosen, it was decided that the old meeting house would be put up at auction. On April 17, 1803, the old meeting house was used by the congregation for the last time.

=== The Fifth Meeting House ===
The current structure, finished in 1804, is the fifth meetinghouse for First Church of Roxbury. It is listed as a major structure in the John Eliot Square National Register District, along with the Dillaway-Thomas House. The church is a two-story wood building with a bell tower, designed in the “Federal Meetinghouse” style. It measures 80 by 70 feet, and has an approximate seating capacity of 800.

The tower, which was reconstructed after a hurricane in 1954, contains a bell purchased in 1819 from the Paul Revere Foundry in Canton, Massachusetts that weighs 1538 pounds. The clock on the tower’s facade dates to 1863.

The church membership became a religious society (the First Religious Society in Roxbury) affiliated with the Universalist church in 1825. The pastor from 1830 to 1878 was George Putnam, a Unitarian minister, Harvard graduate, and Transcendentalist.

== Modern day ==
=== Unitarian Universalist Urban Ministry ===
The Unitarian Universalist Urban Ministry is a Roxbury, Boston, MA-based social justice organization focused on providing nonsectarian programs that focus on providing the community with "academic and enrichment programming for children and youth, emergency shelter for individuals and families fleeing from domestic violence, affordable housing and intentional community for young women, including transitional housing for those leaving shelter, and volunteer-based capacity-building services for Roxbury-serving nonprofits."
