= Errand into the Wilderness =

1956 book by Perry Miller

- Author: Perry Miller
- Subject: United States history
- Published: 1956 (Belknap Press)
- Pages: 256
- ISBN: 9780674261556

Errand into the Wilderness is a 1956 intellectual history book about colonial America written by Perry Miller.

== Publication ==
The book's title is taken from a 1660 sermon by Samuel Danforth.
