= David Howard-Pitney =

American historian

David Howard-Pitney is an American historian, notable for his works on the civil rights movement of the 1950s and 1960s.

== Life ==
He was born and raised in Oregon, United States. He went to Oregon State University, attended History Graduate school in Minnesota, and has lived in California since 1986.

He is an American historian who has taught at the University of Wisconsin-River Falls, San Jose State University, and at De Anza College. He is now retired and living in Cupertino, CA. He has authored several historical books and articles, including "The African-American Jeremiad" and "Martin Luther King Jr., Malcolm X, and the Civil Rights Struggle of the 1950s and 1960s."

== Career ==
He has taught American history and American studies at San Jose State University and the University of Wisconsin-River Falls. He is now professor and history department chair of De Anza College.

== Bibliography ==
His books include:

- Martin Luther King, Jr., Malcolm X, and the Civil Rights Struggle of the 1950s and 1960s: A Brief History with Documents (2004, Bedford/St Martin's: ISBN 978-0312395056)
- The African-American Jeremiad: Appeals for Justice in America
