= American Slavery, American Freedom =

Book by Edmund Morgan

American Slavery, American Freedom: The Ordeal of Colonial Virginia
- First edition
- Author: Edmund Morgan
- Language: English
- Subject: American history, Virginia, slavery
- Genre: Non-fiction
- Publisher: W W Norton & Co Inc
- Publication date: September 1975
- Publication place: United States
- Media type: Print, ebook, audiobook
- Pages: 464 pages
- ISBN: 039305554X

American Slavery, American Freedom: The Ordeal of Colonial Virginia is a 1975 history text by American historian Edmund Morgan. The work was first published in September 1975 through W W Norton & Co Inc and is considered to be one of Morgan's seminal works.

== Synopsis ==
American Slavery, American Freedom is Morgan's answer to the paradox which he himself formulates in the beginning of the book: that of Virginia being both the birthplace of the democratic republican United States and, at the same time, the largest slave-holding colony and, later, state. Among voluminous other sources, Morgan employs the archives of Virginia's House of Burgesses, circa 1620 and beyond to explore this paradox and find an explanation for it.

Much of the book is a description of the problem of poverty in England during the 17th century, one of the solutions to which was to send the English poor (many of them shiftless troublemakers) over to the American colonies as indentured servants.

Morgan then focuses on the conflict in 17th century Virginia between the self-serving governing oligarchy and the much larger populations of land-owning freemen, poor freemen, white indentured servants, and black slaves (the last, originally a very small percentage of the population); he shows how such uprisings as Bacon's Rebellion left the oligarchs worried about retaining power. Morgan also suggests that rebel leader Nathaniel Bacon, in encouraging his followers' vengeful hatred of Indians—whatever their tribe and peaceableness—provided Virginia with its first instance of "racism as a political strategy."

Morgan then describes the economics of the Atlantic slave trade during the 17th century and explains how, over time, enslaved Africans became a cheaper labor source to Virginian planters than indentured servants from England, causing the population of poor whites to stop growing while the population of black enslaved workers grew proportionately larger.

Finally, Morgan asserts that, in the late 1600s and early 1700s, the oligarchs enacted strict slave laws for (he alleges) the deliberate purpose of driving a social wedge between enslaved blacks and poor whites—thus creating, so to speak, American racism.

== Reception ==
Warren M. Billings criticized American Slavery, American Freedom as being too simplistic while also stating that it was "a stimulating book".

The Baltimore Sun commented that the title was "misleading" and that it was more about "the ordeal of living in Seventeenth-Century Virginia" than about slavery.

According to Kathleen Brown, new research has appeared with the passage of several decades, much of which complicates or challenges Morgan's description of the encounter between Native Americans and colonists, the rise of slavery, the availability of white indentured servants in the second half of the seventeenth century, and the implications of Bacon's Rebellion. Nevertheless, she notes, the book continues to be assigned in history courses because of Morgan's "eloquent prose, his ability to link key concepts in American history, and his effort to bring the sensibilities of the post-Vietnam era to one of the central tragedies and ironies of American history."
