= Jeremiad =

Type of literary work

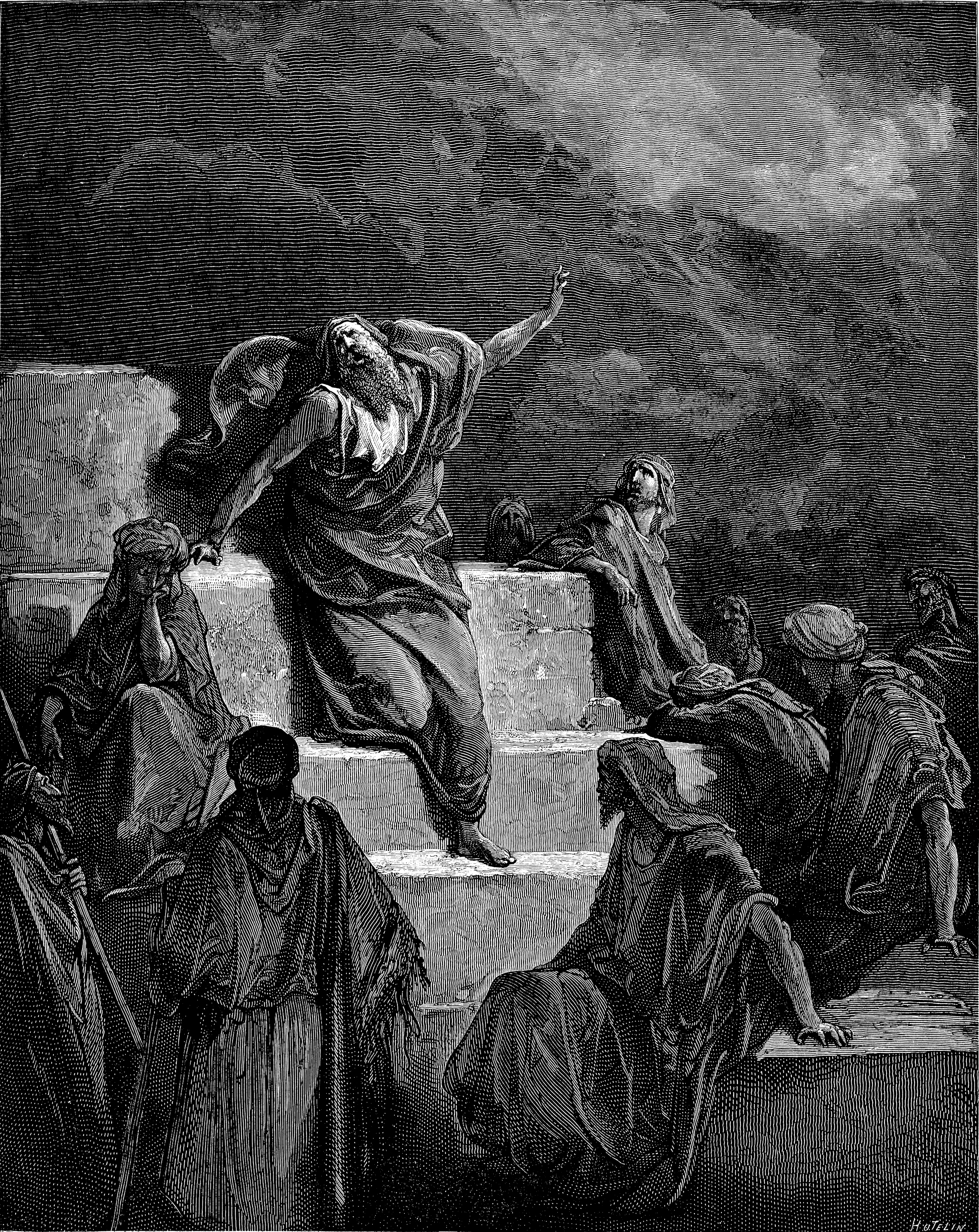
The prophet Jeremiah lamenting the fall of Jerusalem, engraving by Gustave Doré, 1866

A jeremiad is a long literary work, usually in prose, but sometimes in verse, in which the author bitterly laments the state of society and its morals in a serious tone of sustained invective, and always contains a prophecy of society's imminent downfall.

Generally, the term jeremiad is applied to moralistic texts that denounce a society for its wickedness, and prophesies its downfall. Over time, the impact of the term has faded and has become a general expression for lament. It is often perceived with derogatory overtones.

The jeremiad has a unique presence in American culture and in the history of the United States, having roots in Colonial-era settlers in New England. In American culture, jeremiads are closely associated with historical American Puritans and the concept of American exceptionalism.

== Origins and usage ==
The word is named after the biblical prophet Jeremiah, and comes from biblical works attributed to him, the Book of Jeremiah and the Book of Lamentations. The Book of Jeremiah chronicles the downfall of the Kingdom of Judah, and asserts that this is because its rulers have broken the covenant with the Lord.

The Lamentations, similarly, lament the fall of the kingdom of Judah after the conquest prophesied by Jeremiah has occurred:

How lonely sits the city
that once was full of people!
How like a widow she has become,
she that was great among the nations!
She that was a princess among the provinces
has become subject to forced labor.

She weeps bitterly in the night,
with tears on her cheeks;
among all her lovers,
she has no one to comfort her;
all her friends have dealt treacherously with her;
they have become her enemies.

Judah has gone into exile with suffering
and hard servitude;
she lives now among the nations;
she finds no resting place;
her pursuers have all overtaken her
in the midst of her distress.

The roads to Zion mourn,
for no one comes to the festivals;
all her gates are desolate;
her priests groan;
her young girls grieve,
and her lot is bitter.

The American Heritage Dictionary of the English Language defines Jeremiad as: "a literary work or speech expressing a bitter lament or a righteous prophecy of doom", as well as being form of lamentation; an utterance of grief or sorrow; a complaining tirade: used with a spice of ridicule or mockery, implying either that the grief itself is unnecessarily great, or that the utterance of it is tediously drawn out and attended with a certain satisfaction to the utterer. Its third definition is "a tale of sorrow, disappointment, or complaint; a doleful story; a dolorous tirade; – generally used satirically". Merriam-Webster dictionary defines Jeremiad as "a prolonged lamentation or complaint; also: a cautionary or angry harangue".

== Use in American culture ==
The jeremiad was a favorite literary device of the Puritans, and was used in prominent early evangelical sermons like "Sinners in the Hands of an Angry God" by Jonathan Edwards. Besides Jonathan Edwards, such jeremiads can be found in every era of American history, including John Adams, Thomas Jefferson and James Fenimore Cooper.

The term has also found use in American literature. Works by Norman Mailer (The Armies of the Night), Thomas Pynchon (The Crying of Lot 49), Nathanael West (The Day of the Locust) and Hubert Selby (Last Exit to Brooklyn) were interpreted as jeremiads, as were older works of American literature such as Herman Melville's The Confidence-Man or William Faulkner's Southern literature.

The work of Robert Bork has also been described as a jeremiad. Extending that tradition in a reflective vein is the autobiographical work of freed American slave Frederick Douglass, who lamented the moral corruption that slavery wrought on America – from both a Jeffersonian and Christian tradition.

=== Role in American politics ===
According to the Canadian literary scholar Sacvan Bercovitch, in a typical American jeremiad, the biblical promise of a perfect society contradicts the actual mistakes of American society. The jeremiad thus has the function of a social corrective in that it links salvation to the righteous behavior of Americans. Bercovitch found this pattern in many political speeches.

The role of America as a myth and concept of salvation is an important part of the political rhetoric of the United States and is described, among other things, in inaugural speeches. America is described as a world and salvation history experiment with a role model character, as a vision and also cited self-accusatory and apocalyptic tones. It corresponds to a civil religious tradition of rhetorical millennialism.

== See also ==
- Philippic (tirade, orations)
- African-American jeremiad
