= Perry Miller =

American historian (1905–1963)

Perry Gilbert Eddy Miller (February 25, 1905 – December 9, 1963) was an American intellectual historian and a co-founder of the field of American Studies. Miller specialized in the history of early America and took an active role in a revisionist view of the colonial Puritan theocracy that was cultivated at Harvard University beginning in the 1920s. Heavy drinking led to his premature death at the age of 58.

== Early life ==
Miller was born in Chicago in 1905 to Eben Perry Sturges Miller, a physician from Mansfield, Ohio, and Sarah Gertrude Miller (née Eddy) from Bellows Falls, Vermont. His father appeared in the deacon's candidacy lists for Seabury-Western Theological Seminary in 1895 and 1898, but he also received a "notice of discipline" for "abandonment or forfeiture of the Holy Orders" and "deposition" from the 1898 ministry. The late 19th-century Episcopal Church of Illinois commonly issued notices of discipline for cases of "moral delinquency," "doctrinal errors," and "sickness and infirmity." Perry Miller was born seven years later.

Perry Miller left home three months before his eighteenth birthday. Inspired by hearing about the adventures of World War I veterans in Europe, between 1922 and 1926, Miller traveled widely, by his own account working in California lettuce fields, acting on Broadway [Greenwich Village], writing for magazines, and working aboard a freighter ship along the Congo River.

In a 1956 preface to the Errand into the Wilderness collection, Perry Miller disclosed that, along the shores of the Congo River, he had decided to pursue the intellectual history of Puritanism. "At Matadi on the banks of the Congo", Miller recounted, "seeking 'adventure' " that he believed World War I veterans had experienced (noting a lack of prescience that "I too should have my own War"), he came to "realize a determination." Miller acknowledged that "the adventures that Africa afforded were tawdry enough, but it became the setting for a sudden epiphany (if the word be not too strong) of the pressing necessity for expounding my America to the twentieth century." Miller compared his situation to that of Edward Gibbon, who sat "disconsolate amid the ruins of the Capitol at Rome" when a similar epiphany thrust upon Gibbon the " 'laborious work' of The Decline and Fall." Thus "it was given to me, equally disconsolate on the edge of a jungle of central Africa, to have thrust upon me the mission of expounding what I took to be the innermost propulsion of the United States, while supervising, in that barbaric tropic, the unloading of drums of case oil flowing out of the inexhaustible wilderness of America." The epiphany "demanded" that he study "the beginning of a beginning. Once I was back in the security of a graduate school, it seemed obvious that I had to commence with the Puritan migration."

=== Education ===
Perry Miller received his baccalaureate in 1928 and his Ph.D. in 1931, both from the University of Chicago, where he was a member of the Lambda Chi Alpha fraternity.

== Career ==
Miller began teaching at Harvard University in 1931. In 1942, Miller resigned his post at Harvard to join the United States Army and was stationed in Great Britain for the duration of World War II, where he worked for the Office of Strategic Services. Miller may have been instrumental in creating the Office of Strategic Services and certainly he worked for the Psychological Warfare Division for the duration of the war. He was elected to the American Academy of Arts and Sciences in 1943.

After 1945, Miller returned to teaching at Harvard. He also offered courses at the Harvard Extension School.

Miller wrote book reviews and articles in The Nation and The American Scholar. In his biography of Jonathan Edwards, published in 1949, Miller argued that Edwards was actually an artist working in the only medium available to him in the 18th century American frontier, namely that of religion and theology. His posthumously published The Life of the Mind in America, for which he received a Pulitzer Prize, was the first installment of a projected 10-volume series. Miller spent a year at the Institute for Advanced Study in Princeton, New Jersey on a Guggenheim Fellowship and also taught in Japan for a year. He was elected to the American Philosophical Society in 1956.

In 1987, Edmund S. Morgan claimed that Miller, his undergraduate tutor and graduate dissertation advisor, was an atheist, like himself.

=== Influence ===
Miller's attempts to analyze religious attitudes and ideas in Colonial America and later set a new standard for intellectual historiography. Historians report that Miller's work has influenced the work of later historians on topics ranging from Puritan studies to discussions of narrative theory. In his most famous book, The New England Mind: The Seventeenth Century (1939), Miller adopted a cultural approach to illuminate the worldview of the Puritans, unlike previous historians who employed psychological and economic explanations of their beliefs and behavior.

== Death ==
A maid found Perry Miller alone and not breathing at Harvard University, on December 10, 1963. The coroner's report indicated that Miller had been dead for at least twenty-four hours prior to the maid's grim discovery. Miller, according to Abram Van Engen, was a "committed liberal" in recovery for alcoholism. His physician had limited the libations to two drinks per day. After the assassination of John F. Kennedy, Miller " 'got drunk and stayed that way' ", perishing from acute hemorrhagic pancreatitis in his room at Leverett House or, as Van Engen puts it, "...kicked out of his house by his wife, he lived alone in a Harvard dorm room and eventually drank himself to death." Rumors circulated, and continue to persist, that "Miller died in his dorm room surrounded by empty bottles of liquor. Multiple students described it as a suicide." In contrast, The New York Times, within hours of police confirmation that the body was indeed the corpse of Perry Miller, reported that he "had died apparently from a stroke." Especially within the Harvard community, "his death was mourned as a loss to the intellectual landscape in the U.S."

== Congo controversy ==
=== 1974–1979 ===
The Congo River "epiphany" from Perry Miller's early life produced much posthumous scrutiny by scholars and media outlets. In 1974, Elizabeth Miller, Perry Miller's widow, informed Stanford Searl Jr., a Quaker disciple of her late husband's writings, that, " 'as for the Congo episode...yes, there is a kind of truth in Perry’s romantic reference in Errand. But Perry, who was a writer, was in part creating, after the fact, an effective anecdote as well as an explanation of why his own errand had been undertaken.' " Five years later, in his introduction to a collection of Perry Miller's essays, Searl publicly responded to Elizabeth Miller, pointing out that "what is of significance is not how it came about---whether it was indeed vouchsafed or not." In fact, according to Searl, Walter J. Ong had confirmed that Perry Miller frequently claimed such epiphanies because " 'it was the kind of thing he liked to remember.' " Searl then ascribed significance not to the veracity of the narrative itself, but to Perry Miller's intention of binding "the roles of actor and adventurer to the world of ideas."

=== 1979–present ===
Historians have since critiqued Perry Miller's account of the Congo episode. The autobiographical passage, whether substantiated or not, revealed twentieth-century "U.S. investments in empire"; checked "off every box in the colonial rulebook"; foregrounded "the ways in which imperialism has been simultaneously formative and disavowed in the foundational discourse of American studies"; and, intentionally or unintentionally, depicted "an empire in the ascendant; moreover, an empire which would govern the conditions in which he worked and which might well expect a particular self-image to be upheld by its chroniclers...this has led some to reinforce the erroneous belief that Miller was a 'safe' historian, persuaded of the righteousness of America and the justice of its actions."

American Studies specialist Paul Lauter has written and lectured on formulating pedagogical approaches to Perry Miller's "epiphany" in the Congo. According to Lauter, his students "...were suspicious of [Amy] Kaplan's revelations of the implications of Miller's starting point for American Studies...'Isn't she really saying he's a racist?' one student memorably protested. I tried to deflect attention from Miller's psychology and toward the implications of the narrative for the early shape of American Studies...the discussion led us to apply Jameson's rubric---'always historicize'...examining Miller in this way enabled us to understand how what we designated as 'American Studies' was not fixed by history into a particular profile but like other phenomenon was historically rooted in the starting points particular scholars in particular circumstances at particular times might recognize as different."

== Legacy ==
At Harvard, he directed numerous Ph.D. dissertations. His most notable student was fellow Pulitzer winner Edmund Morgan, although Bernard Bailyn cited him as an influence, albeit a fractious one.

Margaret Atwood dedicated The Handmaid's Tale to Perry Miller. Atwood had studied with Miller while attending Radcliffe before women were admitted to Harvard.

== Books ==
- 1933. Orthodoxy in Massachusetts, 1630-1650
- 1939. The New England Mind: The Seventeenth Century
- 1949. Jonathan Edwards
- 1950. The Transcendentalists: An Anthology
- 1953. The New England Mind: From Colony to Province
- 1953. Roger Williams: His Contribution to the American Tradition
- 1954. Religion and Freedom of Thought
- 1954. American Thought: Civil War to World War I
- 1956. Errand into the Wilderness
- 1956. The American Puritans (editor)
- 1957. The American Transcendentalists: Their Prose and Poetry
- 1957. The Raven and the Whale: Poe, Melville and the New York Literary Scene
- 1958. Consciousness in Concord: The Text of Thoreau's Hitherto "Lost Journal"
- 1961. The Legal Mind in America: From Independence to the Civil War
- 1965. Life of the Mind in America: From the Revolution to the Civil War
- 1967. Nature's Nation
