= Sacvan Bercovitch =

Canadian literary and cultural critic

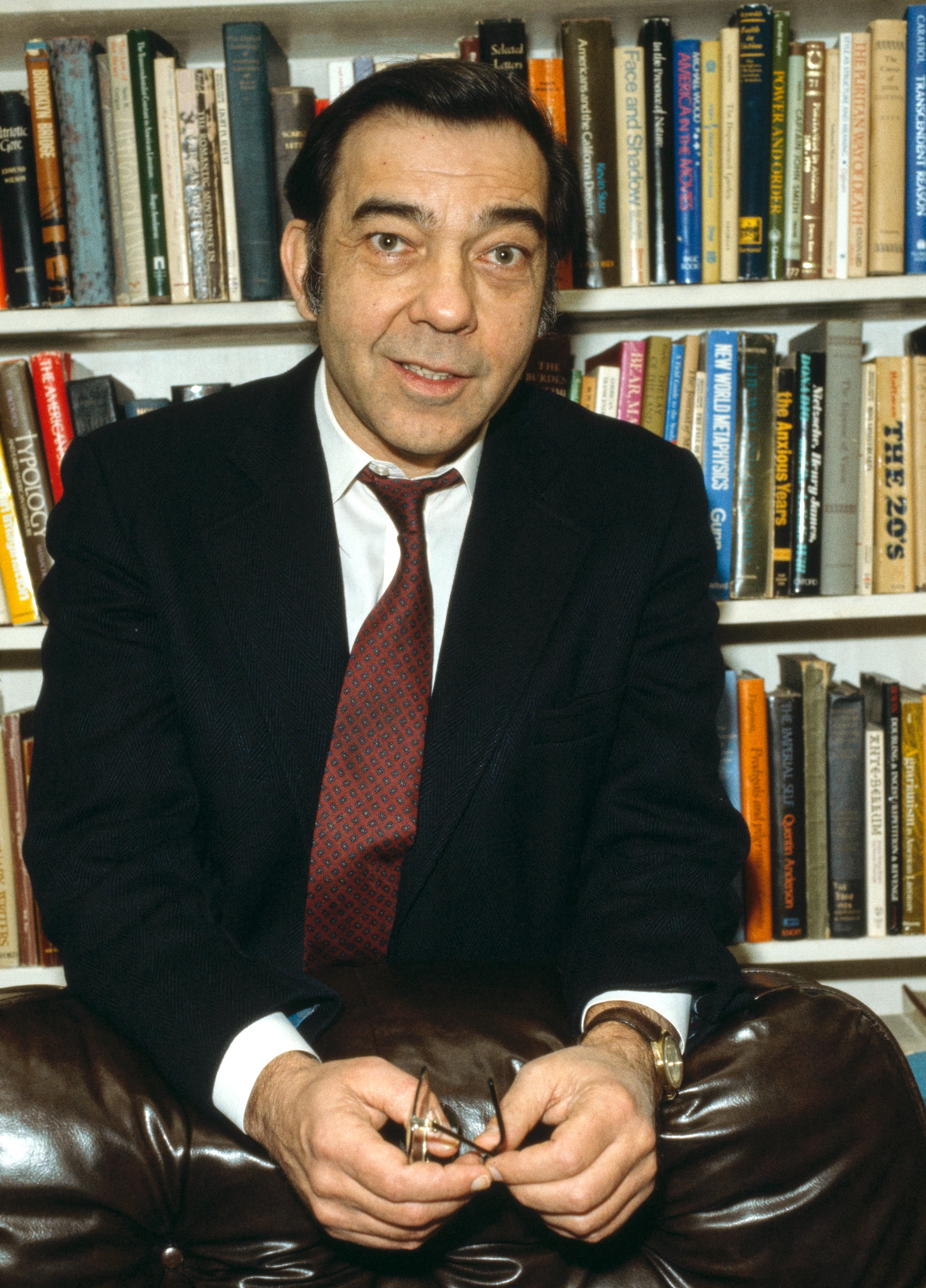
Bercovitch in 1982

Sacvan Bercovitch (October 4, 1933 – December 8, 2014) was a Canadian literary and cultural critic who spent most of his life teaching and writing in the United States. During an academic career spanning five decades, he was considered to be one of the most influential and controversial figures of his generation in the emerging field of American studies.

== Education and academic career ==
Bercovitch was born in Montreal, Quebec, and his given name is a portmanteau of Sacco and Vanzetti, the Anarchists who had been executed six years earlier. Prior to receiving his B.A. at Sir George Williams College, now Concordia University (1958), he studied at The New School and Reed College. He completed his Ph.D. at Claremont Graduate School, now Claremont Graduate University (1965). He later received honorary degrees: an LLD from Concordia in 1993 and an HLD from Claremont in 2005.

Bercovitch taught at Brandeis, the University of California-San Diego, Princeton, and from 1970 to 1984 at Columbia. From 1984 until he retired in 2001 he taught at Harvard, where he held the Powell M. Cabot Professorship in American Literature (the Chair formerly held by Perry Miller and Alan Heimert, a student of Professor Miller). He was elected a Fellow of the American Academy of Arts and Sciences in 1986. Bercovitch also served as a visiting faculty member in many academic programs, including the School of Criticism and Theory at Dartmouth, the Bread Loaf School of English, Tel-Aviv University, the University of Rome, the Ecole des Hautes Etudes in Paris, the Chinese Academy of Social Studies in Beijing, the Kyoto University Seminar in Japan, and the Academy of Sciences in Moscow. He received the Distinguished Scholar Award for Extraordinary Lifetime Achievement in Early American Literature (2002), the Jay B. Hubbell Prize for Lifetime Achievement in American Literary Studies (2004), and the Bode-Pearson Prize for Lifetime Achievement in American Studies (2007).

== Writings ==
=== Early work ===
Bercovitch's early books, The Puritan Origins of the American Self and The American Jeremiad (along with his edited collections on typology and The American Puritan Imagination) presented a new interpretation of the structures of expression and feeling that composed the writing of Puritan New England. They proposed:

- (1) the importance of scriptural typology in Puritan New England thought;
- (2) the centrality of the imagination in the New England Puritans' writings;
- (3) the relation between the imagination, religious belief, and cultural-historical context;
- (4) the centrality of the text in the process of communal self-definition, from colony to province to nationhood, from the Puritan use of scripture through the Declaration of Independence and the Gettysburg Address, as well as through a national literary tradition; and, from all these four perspectives,
- (5) an understanding of the origins in New England Puritanism of a distinctive mode of expression and belief that eventuated in the "American" identity.

Bercovitch’s work during this time has been criticized for overlooking the spiritual and moral values of the Puritans. This points to the central aspect of his approach: the Puritan legacy as a rhetorical model of cultural continuity. He saw the Puritan "errand" as a proto-capitalist venture that offered a singularly compelling rationale for a modern community expanding into a major modern nation. What made it compelling from the start was not just its religious emphasis; it was the rhetoric through which that persistent (because remarkably adaptable, flexible) religious influence shaped Puritans' secular concept of their New World mission. Whereas other colonists—in New France, New Spain, New Amsterdam—understood themselves to be emissaries of European empire, the New England Puritans repudiated the "Old World." Instead, they centered their imperial enterprise on the meaning that they read into their "New World": "America" as the new promised land—which is to say, the promised land of the new modern world. Over the next two centuries their vision opened into a sacred-secular symbology, one that (in changing forms, to accommodate changing times) nourished the rhetoric of a new identity, the United States as "America."

=== Later work ===
Through his exploration of the expressive culture of Puritan New England, Bercovitch moved forward, into the nineteenth and twentieth centuries, toward a description of a distinctive nationalist ideology, involving the distinctive strategies of liberal culture. That ambition yielded his major books of the nineties, The Office of "The Scarlet Letter" and The Rites of Assent (as well as his edited collections on Reconstructing American Literary History and Ideology and Classic American Literature), which in effect "complete the writing of the history of American liberal culture begun in the earlier work--a history that provocatively specifies how, in the United States, acts of withering dissent are put to the service of a vision of consensus." More largely, Bercovitch has argued that the strategy of American pluralism is precisely to elicit dissent—political, intellectual, aesthetic, and academic, both utopian (progressivist) and dystopian (catastrophic) -- in order to redirect it into an affirmation of American ideals. The argument has provoked polemics from both the right and the left. From the right, he was decried as the central figure of an upstart generation of New Americanists: from the left, he was labeled as a consensus historian who endorsed the idea of American exceptionalism. Partly in response to his critics, Bercovitch has qualified analysis in a series of essays (1) acknowledging the modes of basic resistance to ideology within democratic liberalism; (2) detailing the enormous energizing force of American ideals, economically and aesthetically; even while (3) insisting on the continuing power of the rhetoric of America to enlist utopia itself as a mainstay of the culture. In 2004, Bercovitch completed a 20-year project as General Editor of the multi-volume Cambridge History of American Literature, which has been called "without a doubt, and without a serious rival, the scholarly history of our generation."

=== Contribution ===
Bercovitch's work, which has been translated into many languages, helped to redirect the study of Early American Literature and contributed to a new, historicist turn in American literary and cultural criticism. It is characterized by large historical claims; it is focused on close textual reading, understood in the broad sense of cultural textuality; and in this sense it bears theoretically on questions related to interdisciplinarity. His contribution may be summarized as follows: (1) he has helped restructure American literary history by his emphasis on cultural close reading; (2) he has called attention to the crucial religious dimensions of the American Way; (3) he has helped shape the inquiry into the rhetorical and social constructedness of the American identity, including the concepts of consensus history and American exceptionalism; (4) he has formulated connections between ideology (in its anthropological sense) and imaginative expression, emphasizing not only the cultural pressures on aesthetic expression but the explosive aesthetic force of literary texts; and (5) he has been influential in exploring the strategies of liberal dissent. In the assessment of a recent literary historian, Bercovitch's "audacious writings signaled an important shift in the understanding of culture.... compelling revisions of [traditional] categories and assumptions." In one of his citations for lifetime achievement, " Bercovitch has been the foremost interpreter of early American literature for his generation and probably of several generations." The Hubbell Prize Committee commended Bercovitch for his "transformative effect on the practice of American literary scholarship." The citation for the Bode-Pearson Prize of the American Studies Association commended Bercovitch as "the key figure in the ideological turn of American literary study and the galvanizing source of its interdiscilpinary practice."

== Fellowships and honors ==
During his lifetime, Bercovitch held fellowships in residence at the Yale Center for American Studies; the Center for Advanced Study in the Social and Behavioral Sciences at Stanford, the American Antiquarian Society, the Woodrow Wilson International Center for Scholars, and the Huntington Library. He was awarded numerous fellowships and grants over his career, including from the Ford Foundation, the John Carter Brown Library, the Guggenheim Foundation, the American Council of Learned Societies, and the National Endowment for the Humanities. Bercovitch represented the Fulbright Scholar Program in Europe (Prague, Moscow, Warsaw, Coimbra. Portugal, and elsewhere) and had been a distinguished lecturer and keynote speaker at countless universities, colleges, and conferences throughout the world.

Bercovitch served on a wide array of professional advisory boards, editorial boards, fellowship panels and committees; and won awards for both teaching and scholarship, among them the Brandeis Award for Excellency in Teaching (1967), the Cabot Award for Achievement in the Humanities (1991), and the James Russell Lowell Prize of the Modern Languages Association for the best scholarly book (1992). He served as President of the American Studies Association (1982–1984), and in 1986 was elected to the American Academy of Arts and Sciences. He received Lifetime Achievement Awards from both the Modern Languages Association (2002, 2004) and from the American Studies Association (2007). After his official retirement from an academic career, Bercovitch returned to his early interests in Jewish Studies (he has translated Sholom Aleichem and other Yiddish writers) and received an Emeritus Professor Grant from the Mellon Foundation for a project on "The Ashkenazi Renaissance, 1880-1940."

== Teaching ==
Bercovitch was a popular teacher on both the undergraduate and the graduate levels; many of his students now occupy prominent positions at universities and colleges from Yale to UCLA, and from Beijing to Oxford, Tel Aviv, and Rome. One former student, now a professor at the University of Pennsylvania, has written of his "enormous talents as a teacher" and that Bercovitch conveyed the ways in which "the same resources of language that transmit ideology also carry the capacity to 'break free' from preexisting ideas and to open new thresholds of aesthetic experience and understanding" In a more general tribute, another former student, now professor at UCLA, stated:

The example of scholarly rigor, searching curiosity, and untendentious inquiry that Bercovitch has presented has been widely influential, nowhere more clearly than in the work of the many graduate students he has supervised over the years. On the occasion of his retirement, Harvard University hosted a conference in his honor, featuring as speakers a selection of his doctoral students from Columbia and Harvard. "The Next Turn in American Literary and Cultural Studies," as the conference was called, was notable for many reasons, but perhaps most conspicuously for the variety and distinction of the scholarly and critical work Bercovitch has sponsored: while there have been mechanically Bercovitchean essays and books published in the wake of his own, Bercovitch's students have learned precisely not to mimic his work but to reproduce, as well as they can, his independence of mind and unpredictability of argument. It is this outcome that honors him most truly.

== Selected bibliography ==
=== Writer ===
- The Puritan Origins of the American Self, 1975: Yale University Press, New Haven and London; Second Printing, 1976; Paperback edition, 1977. ISBN 0-300-02117-8
- The American Jeremiad, 1978: University of Wisconsin Press, Madison. Paperback edition, 1980; 2nd edition, 1989. ISBN 0-299-07354-8
- The Office of "The Scarlet Letter", 1991: The Johns Hopkins University Press, Baltimore. Paperback edition, 1993. ISBN 0-8018-4584-X
- The Rites of Assent: Transformations in the Symbolic Construction of America, 1993: Routledge, New York and London, Paperback edition, 1993. Chinese translation, 2005. ISBN 0-415-90015-8

=== Editor ===
- Typology and Early American Literature, 1972: University of Massachusetts Press, Amherst. Introduction, pp. 5–10; bibliography, pp. 124–246
- The American Puritan Imagination: Essays in Revaluation, 1974: Cambridge University Press, New York and Cambridge. Introduction and Bibliography, pp. 1–16, 212-216. Reprinted, 2004. ISBN 0-521-09841-6
- Reconstructing American Literary History (Harvard English Studies, vol. 13), 1986: Harvard University Press, Cambridge, Mass. Introduction, pp. ix-xii ISBN 0-7351-0228-7
- Ideology and Classic American Literature (with Myra Jehlen), 1986: Cambridge University Press, New York and Cambridge. Afterword, pp. 418–447.
- Cambridge History of American Literature, 8 vols, 1986-2004: Cambridge University Press, New York and Cambridge; Chinese translation, 2007.
- Nathanael West: Novels and Other Writings, 1997: Library of America, New York. Selection and Chronology, pp. 807–812. ISBN 1-883011-28-0

=== Selected chapters/sections of books ===
- "Romance and Anti Romance in Sir Gawain and the Green Knight," in Critical Studies of "Sir Gawain and the Green Knight", ed. Donald R. Howard and C.K. Zoker, 1968: University of Notre Dame Press, Notre Dame, pp. 257–266.
- "The Ideological Context of the American Renaissance," in Forms and Functions of History in American Literature, ed. Willi Paul Adams, Winfried Fluck, and Jorgen Peper, 1981: Berlin, pp. - 20.
- "The Biblical Basis of the American Myth," in The Bible and American Arts and Letters, ed. Giles Gunn, 1983: Fortress Press, Philadelphia, pp. 219–229
- "A Literary Approach to Cultural Studies," in Field Work: Sites in Literary and Cultural Studies, ed. Marjorie Garber, Paul B. Franklin, and Rebecca L. Walkowitz, 1996: Routledge, pp. 247–256.
- "Games of Chess: A Model of Literary and Cultural Studies," in Centuries Ends, Narrative Means, ed. Robert Newman, 1996: Stanford University Press, pp. 15–58, 319-329.
- "The Function of the Literary in a Time of Cultural Studies," in "Culture" and the Problem of the Disciplines, ed. John Carlos Rowe, 1998: Columbia University Press, pp. 69–87

=== Selected articles ===
- "America as Canon and Context: Literary History in a Time of Dissensus," American Literature, vol. 58 (1986), pp. 99–107.
- "Investigations of an Americanist," Journal of American History, vol. 88 (1991), pp. 972–987.
- "The Question of Literary History," Common Knowledge, vol. 4 (1995), pp. 1–8.
- "The Myth of America," Litteraria Pragensia (Prague), vol. 25 (2003), pp. 1–20; reprinted in After History, ed. Martin Prochazka, 2006, Litteraria Pragensia, pp,345-370

=== Selected translations from Yiddish ===
- Yaacov Zipper, "The True Image," Prism International, XII (1973), pp. 88 96; reprinted in Yiddish, I (1975), pp. 65–74; in Canadian Yiddish Writings, ed. Abraham Boyarsky and Lazar Sarna, 1976: Harvest House, Montreal, pp. 11–20, and in The Far Side of the River, ed. Mervin Butovsky and Ode Garfinkle, 1985: Mosaic Press, New York, 1985, pp. 15–24.
- Itzik Manger, "Eight Ballads" (with commentary), Moment, vol. 3 (1978), pp. 44 52; reprinted in Russian, in Jewish Survey, I (1979), pp. 14–16.
- Sholom Aleichem, "The Pot" and "The Krushniker Delegation," in Stories of Sholom Aleichem, ed. Irving Howe and Ruth Wisse, 1979: New Republic Books, Washington, DC, pp. 71–81, 232-244.
- Bryna Bercovitch, "Becoming Revolutionary," Arguing with the Storm: Canadian Women Writers, ed. Rhea Tregebov (Sumach Press: Toronto, 2007), pp. 59–78 (with Sylvia Ary); second edition, Feminist Press, 2008, pp. 33–49
