= Edmund Morgan (historian) =

American historian (1916–2013)

Edmund Sears Morgan
- Born: January 17, 1916; Minneapolis, Minnesota, U.S.
- Died: July 8, 2013 (aged 97); New Haven, Connecticut, U.S.
- Education: Harvard University (BA, PhD); London School of Economics
- Scientific career
- Workplaces: University of Chicago; Brown University; Yale University
- Doctoral advisor: Perry Miller
- Doctoral students: Joseph Ellis; Christine Leigh Heyrman; Bruce H. Mann

Edmund Sears Morgan (January 17, 1916 – July 8, 2013) was an American historian and an authority on early American history. He was the Sterling Professor of History at Yale University, where he taught from 1955 to 1986. He specialized in American colonial history, with some attention to English history. Thomas S. Kidd says he was noted for his incisive writing style, "simply one of the best academic prose stylists America has ever produced." He covered many topics, including Puritanism, political ideas, the American Revolution, slavery, historiography, family life, and numerous notables such as Benjamin Franklin.

== Early life and education ==
Morgan was born in Minneapolis, Minnesota, the second child of Edmund Morris Morgan and Elsie Smith Morgan. His mother was from a Yankee family that practiced Christian Science, though she distanced herself from that faith. His father, descended from Welsh coal miners, taught law at the University of Minnesota. His sister was Roberta Mary Morgan (later Wohlstetter), also a historian and, like Edmund, a winner of the Bancroft Prize.

In 1925, the family moved from Washington, D.C., to Arlington, Massachusetts, when their father was appointed a professor at Harvard Law School.

Morgan attended Belmont Hill School in Belmont, Massachusetts, and then enrolled at Harvard College, where he initially intended to study English history and literature. But after taking a course in American literature with F. O. Matthiessen, he switched to the new major of American civilization (history and literature), with Perry Miller as his tutor. He received his bachelor's degree from Harvard in 1937. Then, at the urging of the jurist and family friend Felix Frankfurter, Morgan began attending lectures at the London School of Economics.

In 1942, Morgan earned his Ph.D. in the History of American Civilization from Harvard University with Miller as his adviser.

== Military service ==
Although a pacifist, Morgan became convinced after the fall of France in June 1940 that only military force could stop Hitler, and he withdrew his application for conscientious objector status. During World War II, he trained as a machinist at the MIT Radiation Laboratory, where he turned out parts for radar installations.

== Personal life and death ==
In 1939, he married Helen Theresa Mayer, who died in 1982.

Morgan died in New Haven, Connecticut on July 8, 2013, at the age of 97. His cause of death was pneumonia. He was survived by two daughters—Penelope Aubin and Pamela Packard—from his first marriage; his second wife, Marie (née Carpenter) Caskey Morgan, a historian; six grandchildren; and seven great-grandchildren.

== Career ==
In 1946–55, Morgan taught history at Brown University in Providence, Rhode Island before becoming a professor at Yale University, where he directed some 60 PhD dissertations in colonial history before retiring in 1986.

As an undergraduate at Harvard, Morgan was profoundly influenced by historian Perry Miller, who became a lifelong friend. Although both were atheists, they had a deep understanding and respect for Puritan religion. From Miller, Morgan learned to appreciate:

The intellectual rigor and elegance of a system of ideas that made sense of human life in a way no longer palatable to most of us. Certainly not palatable to me... He left me with a habit of taking what people have said at face value unless I find compelling reasons to discount it... What Americans said from the beginning about taxation and just government deserved to be taken as seriously as the Puritans' ideas about God and man.

Morgan's many books and articles covered a range of topics in the history of the colonial and Revolutionary periods, using intellectual, social history, biographical, and political history approaches. Two of his early books, The Birth of the Republic (1956) and The Puritan Dilemma (1958), have for decades been required reading in many undergraduate history courses. His works include American Slavery, American Freedom (1975), which won the Society of American Historians' Francis Parkman Prize, the Southern Historical Association's Charles S. Sydnor Prize and the American Historical Association's Albert J. Beveridge Award, and Inventing the People: The Rise of Popular Sovereignty in England and America (1988), which won Columbia University's Bancroft Prize in American History in 1989. Morgan wrote a biography of Benjamin Franklin in which he made extensive use of The Papers of Benjamin Franklin. He also wrote biographies on Ezra Stiles and Roger Williams.

=== Puritans ===
Morgan's trio The Puritan Family: Religion and Domestic Relations in 17th-Century New England (1944), The Puritan Dilemma (1958), and Visible Saints: The History of a Puritan Idea (1963) restored the intellectual respectability of the Puritans, and revealed their appetite for healthy sex, causing a renaissance in Puritan studies, partly because both Morgan and his mentor Miller were Ivy League atheist professors, which added to their credibility. Visible Saints, dedicated to Miller, was a reinterpretation of the Puritan ideal of the "Church of the Elect." Morgan argued that the criterion for church membership was not fixed in England. Soon after their arrival in the Colonies, the Puritans restricted membership to a gathered church composed exclusively of tested Saints.

Morgan's 1958 book The Puritan Dilemma raised his status in the public consciousness, and the book became the most assigned textbook in U.S. history survey courses, documenting the change in understanding among Puritans of what it means to be a member of a church. Morgan described the Puritan as "doing right in a world that does wrong...Caught between the ideals of God's Law and the practical needs of the people, John Winthrop walked a line few could tread."

=== American Revolution ===
In The Stamp Act Crisis (1953) and The Birth of the Republic (1956) Morgan rejected the Progressive interpretation of the American Revolution and its assumption that the rhetoric of the Patriots was mere rhetorical bluster. Instead Morgan returned to the interpretation first set out by George Bancroft a century before that the patriots were deeply motivated by a commitment to liberty. Historian Mark Egnal argues that:

The leading neo-Whig historians, Edmund Morgan and Bernard Bailyn, underscore this dedication to whiggish principles, although with variant readings. For Morgan, the development of the patriots' beliefs was a rational, clearly defined process.

=== Slavery ===
In his 1975 book American Slavery, American Freedom, Morgan explored "the American paradox, the marriage of slavery and freedom":

Human relations among us still suffer from the former enslavement of a large portion of our predecessors. The freedom of the free, the growth of freedom experienced in the American Revolution depended more than we like to admit on the enslavement of more than 20 percent of us at that time. How republican freedom came to be supported, at least in large part, by its opposite, slavery, is the subject of this book.

Morgan claimed that large Virginia plantation owners exerted an outsized influence on poorer white Virginians and their attitude toward the racial divide (color line) which made it possible for Virginian white men as a group to become more politically equal: ("Aristocrats could more safely preach equality in a slave society than in a free one").

In a controversial passage, Morgan suggests Virginia's poor whites felt no racial superiority to poor blacks. He does this by providing evidence that, in 17th-century Virginia, poor white indentured servants and black slaves frequently cooperated with each other and worked together. Morgan cites the 1676 Bacon's Rebellion as evidence of a surprising racial egalitarianism among the poor, since Bacon incorporated runaway black slaves into his army.

Despite the assertions of such writers as Michelle Alexander, however, Morgan does not state that Bacon's Rebellion was the reason that rich landowners stopped purchasing white indentured servants and started increasing their purchase of black slaves; rather, regional changes in labor economics was the reason black slaves began to replace white servants: during the early 1600s, white servants cost less per unit labor than black slaves did; but by the latter 1600s, the situation reversed itself, and black slaves became the more economical investment. And, as Morgan states, "The planters who bought slaves instead of servants did not do so with any apparent consciousness of the social stability to be gained thereby. Indeed, insofar as Virginians expressed themselves on the subject of slavery, they feared that it would magnify the danger of insurrection in the colony." As events evolved, however, the rising number of black slaves and the virtual end to the importation of indentured servants did stabilize Virginia society. And as time went on, according to Morgan, Virginia politicians learned to further pacify poor whites by fostering a sense of white superiority. "Racism made it possible for white Virginians to develop a devotion to the equality that English republicans had declared to be the soul of liberty." That is, according to Morgan, white men in Virginia were able to become much more politically equal and cohesive than would have been possible without a population of low-status black slaves.

Anthony S. Parent commented: "American historians of our generation admire Edmund Morgan's American Slavery, American Freedom more than any other monograph. Morgan resuscitated American history by placing black slavery and white freedom as its central paradox."

In 2002 Morgan published a surprise New York Times Bestseller, Benjamin Franklin, which dispels the myth of "a comfortable old gentleman staring out at the world over his half-glasses with benevolent comprehension of everything in it", revealing his true mental makeup.

With a wisdom about himself that comes only to the great of heart, Franklin knew how to value himself and what he did without mistaking himself for something more than one man among many. His special brand of self-respect required him to honor his fellow men and women no less than himself.

== Legacy and impact ==
After examining his writings, University of North Florida historian wrote David T. Courtwright wrote that:

They are based on exhaustive research in primary sources; emphasize human agency as against historicist forces; and are written in precise and graceful prose. This combination of rigor, empathy, and lucidity is intended for, and has succeeded in capturing, a broad audience. Morgan is read by secondary school students, undergraduates, and graduate students, as well as by his specialist peers – some sixty of whom were trained in his seminars.

Massachusetts Institute of Technology American history professor Pauline Maier wrote:

As a historian of colonial and revolutionary America, he was one of the giants of his generation, and a writer who could well have commanded a larger nonacademic audience than I suspect he received. He characteristically took on big issues and had a knack for conveying complex, sophisticated truths in a way that made them seem, if not simple, at least easily understandable.

Brooklyn College history professor Benjamin L. Carp describes Morgan as "one of the great historians of early America, with a formidable influence on academic and popular audiences." Jill Lepore called Morgan "one of the most influential American historians of the 20th century." According to Joseph Ellis, Morgan was "revered" by other members of the profession.

Historian and author William Hogeland affirms Morgan's success in enshrining a "consensus approach" to U.S. history, where colonists' ideas, rather than their possible economic interests, were worthy of inspection by 20th century historians. "He was out to define something essential in the American character and thereby create a new master narrative, and to achieve that end, he concocted a false portrayal of the colonists’ petitions," Hogeland wrote.

== Awards and honors ==
Morgan was elected to the American Philosophical Society in 1964 and the American Academy of Arts and Sciences in 1966. In 1971 Morgan was awarded the Yale chapter of Phi Beta Kappa's William Clyde DeVane Medal for outstanding teaching and scholarship, considered one of the most prestigious teaching prizes for Yale faculty. In 1971–1972 Morgan served as president of the Organization of American Historians. In 1972, he became the first recipient of the Douglass Adair Memorial Award for scholarship in early American history, and in 1986 he received the Distinguished Scholar Award of the American Historical Association. He has also won numerous fellowships and garnered a number of honorary degrees and named lectureships. In 1965 he became a Sterling Professor, one of Yale's highest distinctions. Morgan was awarded the 2000 National Humanities Medal by U.S. President Bill Clinton at a ceremony for "extraordinary contributions to American cultural life and thought." In 2006 he received a special Pulitzer Prize "for a creative and deeply influential body of work as an American historian that spans the last half century." In 2008 the American Academy of Arts and Letters honored him with a gold medal for lifetime achievement.

== Books ==
- The Puritan Family: Religion and Domestic Relations in 17th-Century New England (1944) read online
- Virginians at Home: Family Life in the Eighteenth Century (1952)
- The Stamp Act Crisis: Prologue to Revolution (1953), with Helen M. Morgan
- The Birth of the Republic, 1763–89 (1956; 4th ed. 2012) read online
- The Puritan Dilemma: The Story of John Winthrop (1958) read online
- The American Revolution: A Review of Changing Interpretations (1958)
- The Mirror of the Indian (1958)
- Editor, Prologue to the Revolution: Sources and Documents on the Stamp Act Crisis, 1764–1766 (1959)
- The Gentle Puritan: A Life of Ezra Stiles, 1727–1795 (1962) read online
- The National Experience: A History of the United States (1963) coauthor of textbook; several editions
- Visible Saints: The History of a Puritan Idea (1963)
- Editor, The Founding of Massachusetts: Historians and the Sources (1964)
- The American Revolution: Two Centuries of Interpretation (1965)
- Puritan Political Ideas, 1558–1794 (1965) read online
- The Diary of Michael Wigglesworth, 1653–1657: The Conscience of a Puritan (1965)
- The Puritan Family ([1944] 1966)
- Roger Williams: The Church and the State (1967) read online
- So What About History? (1969)
- American Slavery, American Freedom: The Ordeal of Colonial Virginia (1975)
- The Meaning of Independence: John Adams, George Washington, and Thomas Jefferson (1976, reprint with new foreword, 2004)
- The Genius of George Washington (1980)
- Inventing the People: The Rise of Popular Sovereignty in England and America (1988)
- Benjamin Franklin (Yale University Press, 2002) read online
- The Genuine Article: A Historian Looks at Early America (2004), selected review essays from New York Review of Books read online
- American Heroes: Profiles of Men and Women Who Shaped Early America (2009), biographical essays read online

== Selected articles ==
- Morgan, Edmund S. (1937). "The Case against Anne Hutchinson". The New England Quarterly. 10 (4): 635–649. doi:10.2307/359929. JSTOR 359929.
- Morgan, Edmund S. (1942). "The Puritans and Sex". The New England Quarterly. 15 (4): 591–607. doi:10.2307/361501. JSTOR 361501.
- Morgan, Edmund S. (1948). "Colonial Ideas of Parliamentary Power 1764-1766". The William and Mary Quarterly. 5 (3): 311–341. doi:10.2307/1923462. JSTOR 1923462.
- Morgan, Edmund S. (1948). "Thomas Hutchinson and the Stamp Act". The New England Quarterly. 21 (4): 459–492. doi:10.2307/361566. JSTOR 361566.
- Morgan, Edmund S. (1950). "The Postponement of the Stamp Act". The William and Mary Quarterly. 7 (3): 353–392. doi:10.2307/1917228. JSTOR 1917228.
- Morgan, Edmund S. (1954). "Ezra Stiles: The Education of a Yale Man, 1742-1746". Huntington Library Quarterly. 17 (3): 251–268. doi:10.2307/3816428. JSTOR 3816428.
- Morgan, Edmund S. (1957). "The American Revolution: Revisions in Need of Revising". The William and Mary Quarterly. 14 (1): 3–15. doi:10.2307/1917368. JSTOR 1917368.
- Morgan, Edmund S. (1957). "Ezra Stiles and Timothy Dwight". Proceedings of the Massachusetts Historical Society. 72: 101–117. JSTOR 25080517.
- Morgan, Edmund S. (1967). "The Puritan Ethic and the American Revolution". The William and Mary Quarterly. 24 (1): 4–43. doi:10.2307/1920560. JSTOR 1920560.
- Morgan, Edmund S. (1971). "The First American Boom: Virginia 1618 to 1630". The William and Mary Quarterly. 28 (2): 170–198. doi:10.2307/1917308. JSTOR 1917308.
- Morgan, Edmund S. (1971). "The Labor Problem at Jamestown, 1607-18". The American Historical Review. 76 (3): 595–611. doi:10.2307/1851619. JSTOR 1851619.
- Morgan, Edmund S. (1972). "Slavery and Freedom: The American Paradox". The Journal of American History. 59 (1): 5–29. doi:10.2307/1888384. JSTOR 1888384.
- Morgan, Edmund S. (1983). "The World and William Penn". Proceedings of the American Philosophical Society. 127 (5): 291–315. JSTOR 986499.
- Morgan, Edmund S. (1986). "Safety in Numbers: Madison, Hume, and the Tenth 'Federalist'". Huntington Library Quarterly. 49 (2): 95–112. doi:10.2307/3817178. JSTOR 3817178.
- Morgan, Edmund S. (1987). "John Winthrop's 'Modell of Christian Charity' in a Wider Context". Huntington Library Quarterly. 50 (2): 145–151. doi:10.2307/3817255. JSTOR 3817255.
