= Köhler =

Köhler is a German occupational surname literally meaning "charcoal burner". Kohler and Koehler are English transliterations of the surname.

== People ==
- Achim Köhler (born 1964), German politician
- Alan Kohler (born 1952), Australian journalist
- Alban Köhler (1874–1947), German radiologist, described Köhler disease
- Ana Luiza Koehler (born 1977), Brazilian comics artist and architect.
- Anton Kohler (1907–1961), German chess player
- Arthur Koehler (1885–1967), American investigator of the Lindbergh kidnapping
- August Köhler (1866–1948), microscopist and inventor of the Köhler illumination
- Axel Köhler (born 1959), German countertenor and opera director
- Bedřich Köhler (born 1985), Czech ice hockey player
- Benjamin Köhler (born 1980), football player
- Bernhard Koehler (1849–1927), German industrialist and art collector
- Berthold Kohler (born 1961), German journalist
- Carl-Erik Koehler (1895–1958), German general during World War II
- Carla Koehler, American biochemist
- Charles-Amédée Kohler (1790–1874), Swiss chocolate maker
- Christian Köhler (1809–1861), German painter
- Dirk Köhler (1968–1994), German sport shooter in the 1988 Olympics
- Don Koehler (1925–1981), American recognized as tallest man in the world
- Dorothea Köhler (born 1943), German conductor and music educator
- Emmy Köhler (1858–1925), Swedish hymnwriter and writer
- Erich Köhler (1892–1958), German politician, Bundestag president
- Ernest Koehler (1903–1960), American Olympic racewalker
- Ernesto Köhler (1849–1907), flute player and composer
- Ernesto Kohler (1849–1907), flautist and composer
- Erwin Köhler (born 1995), German politician
- Eva Köhler (born 1947), First Lady of Germany 2004–2010
- Florence Koehler (1861–1944), American craftswoman, designer and jeweler
- Florian Köhler (born 1994), German politician
- Franz Köhler (1901–1982), Austrian footballer, managed Iceland team
- Frauke Köhler (born 1983), German State attorney
- Fred Kohler (1888–1938), American actor
- Frederick Koehler (born 1975), American actor
- Garry Koehler (1955–2019), Australian songwriter
- Georg Köhler (1900–1972), German international footballer
- Georges J. F. Köhler (1946–1995), biologist and Nobel laureate
- Gordon Köhler (born 1987), German politician
- Greg Koehler (born 1975), Canadian ice hockey player with Bloomington Prairie
- Gundolf Köhler (1959–1980), right-wing extremist
- Gunther Köhler (1965–2025), German herpetologist
- Heinrich Köhler (1878–1949), German Minister of Finance
- Hermann Köhler (born 1950), German sprinter
- Herman Koehler (1859–1927), American football coach and US Army officer
- Herman Koehler (end) (1873–1931), American college football and ice hockey player
- Hilding Köhler (1888–1982), professor of Meteorology, studied cloud physics
- Hugo W. Koehler (1886–1941), American naval officer during the Russian Civil War
- Horst Köhler (1943–2025), President of Germany (2004–2010)
- Horst Köhler, real name of the singer Guildo Horn (born 1963)
- Ilse Koch (1906–1967), maiden name Ilse Köhler, Nazi war criminal
- Jack Koehler (1930–2012), German-born journalist and White House Communications Director
- Jake Koehler (born 1991), American YouTuber
- James Stark Koehler (1914–2006), American physicist known for stress formula
- Ján Koehler (died 1895), Polish operatic baritone
- Jean Baptiste François René Koehler – French zoologist (1860–1931), French zoologist
- Johann August Ernst Köhler (1829–1903), German teacher and folklorist
- Johann David Köhler (1684–1755), German historian
- Johann Gottfried Koehler (1745–1801), German astronomer
- Johan Harmen Rudolf Köhler (1818–1873), Dutch colonial Major General
- Juliane Köhler (born 1965), German actress
- Josef Kohler (1849–1919), German jurist
- Jörn Köhler (born 1970), German herpetologist
- Judy Koehler (born 1941), Republican, Illinois State Representative
- Jürgen Köhler (born 1946), East German slalom canoeist
- Jürgen Kohler (born 1965), former German football player
- Katarina Köhler (born 1954), Swedish politician
- Kaufmann Kohler (1843–1926), Reform rabbi
- Klaus J. Kohler, German phonetician
- Koos Köhler (1905–1965), Dutch water polo player at the 1928 Olympics
- Kristina Schröder (née Köhler, born 1977), German politician
- Kyle Koehler (born 1961), American politician on Ohio House of Representatives
- Louis Köhler (1820–1886), German composer
- Lukas Köhler (born 1986), German politician
- Lyle Koehler (1944–2015), American historian and author
- Manuel Köhler (born 1969), Austrian slalom canoeist
- Marc Koehler (born 1977), Dutch architect
- Maria João Koehler (born 1992), Portuguese tennis player
- Max J. Kohler (1871–1934), American lawyer
- Megan Koehler (born 1989), Canadian curler
- Michael Köhler (luger) (born 1944), East German luge champion
- Otto Koehler (1889–1974), German zoologist and pioneer ethologist
- Paul Koehler, drummer in Silverstein, a Canadian band
- Pip Koehler (1902–1986), Baseball outfielder for New York Giants
- René Köhler, fictitious conductor in hoax biography
- Richie Kohler, shipwreck diver and historian
- Robert Koehler, German-born painter and art teacher in America
- Robert E. Kohler (born 1937), American chemist and historian of science
- Rolf Köhler (1951–2007), German singer, musician and record producer
- Sheila Kohler (born 1941), South African writer
- Siegfried Köhler (conductor) (1923–2017), German conductor, composer and teacher
- Siegfried Köhler (cyclist) (born 1935), German cyclist
- Sven Köhler (footballer, born 1996), German footballer
- Ted Koehler (1894–1973), American lyricist collaborated with Harold Arlen
- Thomas Köhler (born 1940), East German luge champion
- Tom Koehler (born 1986), American baseball player
- Ulrich Köhler (archaeologist) (1838–1903), German archaeologist
- Walter Köhler (1897–1989), Nazi president of Baden
- Wolfgang Köhler (1887–1967), German psychologist and phenomenologist
- Wolfgang Köhler (pianist) (born 1960), German jazz pianist and professor

=== Kohler family of Wisconsin ===
- David Kohler, businessman, President and CEO of Kohler Co.
- Herbert Kohler Jr., businessman, Chairman of Kohler Co.
- John Michael Kohler, businessman, founder of Kohler Co.
- Terry Kohler, businessman
- Walter J. Kohler Jr., governor of Wisconsin 1951–1957
- Walter J. Kohler Sr., governor of Wisconsin 1929–1931

== See also ==
- Koehler Cultural Center, located on the campus of San Antonio College, Texas, USA
- Köhler's Medicinal Plants, a German medicinal guide published by Franz Eugen Köhler in 1887
- Köhler theory, describes the process in which water vapor condenses and forms liquid cloud drops
- Koehler Township, Michigan, a township in Cheboygan County, Michigan, USA
- Köhler disease, a rare bone disorder of the foot found in children between six and nine years of age. The disease typically affects boys, but it can also affect girls. It was first described in 1908 by Alban Köhler (1874–1947), a German radiologist
- Köhler illumination, a method of specimen illumination used for transmitted and reflected light (trans- and epi-illuminated) optical microscopy
- Köhler & Son, London horn makers
