= 1981 Pulitzer Prize =

Awards for journalism and related fields

The Pulitzer Prizes for 1981 were announced on April 13, 1981.

The winner in each category is listed first, in bold, followed by the other finalists.

== Journalism awards ==
- Public Service:
  - **The Charlotte Observer**, for its week-long series, "Brown Lung: A Case of Deadly Neglect", about byssinosis among North Carolina's textile workers, caused by cotton dust exposure.
  - Independent & Press-Telegram (Long Beach, California), for its report on unnecessary deaths due to inadequate emergency room care in Los Angeles County.
  - The Tennessean, for reporting on the national resurgence of the Ku Klux Klan.
- Local General or Spot News Reporting:
  - **Staff of The Daily News** (Longview, Washington), for its coverage of the eruption of Mount St. Helens, including the photographs by Roger A. Werth.
  - Staff of The Miami Herald, for coverage of the 1980 Miami riots.
  - Staff of the Baltimore News American, for "The Snowball Tragedy", a report about an elderly man accused of killing a teenager for throwing snowballs at his house.
- Local Investigative Specialized Reporting:
  - **Clark Hallas and Robert B. Lowe of The Arizona Daily Star**, for their investigation of misuse of funds by University of Arizona football coach Tony Mason and his staff.
  - Pamela Zekman, Gene Mustain, Gilbert Jimenez, Norma Sosa, Larry Cose, Patricia Smith, and John Whit of the Chicago Sun-Times, for their series, "The Accident Swindlers", an undercover investigation of lawyers and doctors cheating insurance companies out of excessive payouts for minor car accidents.
  - Richard Morin, Carl Hiaasen and Susan Sachs of The Miami Herald, for their series, "Key West: Smugglers' Island", exposing drug trafficking in the island community, aided by corrupt public officials.
- National Reporting:
  - **John M. Crewdson of The New York Times**, for his coverage of illegal aliens and immigration, including over 40 major articles on topics such as migrant smuggling, mistreatment of migrant workers, and corruption among immigration officials.
  - Donald Barlett and James B. Steele of The Philadelphia Inquirer, for their 7-part series, "Energy Anarchy", criticizing the government's handling of the energy crisis and showing how oil companies benefited from it.
  - Jonathan Neumann and Ted Gup of The Washington Post for "Government Out of Control: Contracts", their series on waste and conflicts of interest in federal government contracting.
  - Joseph Volz, Richard Edmonds, Bob Herbert, and Alton Slagle of the New York Daily News, for their 7-part series, "The Crippled Giant", exposing the U.S. military's lack of preparedness for war.
- International Reporting:
  - **Shirley Christian of The Miami Herald**, for reporting of the Salvadoran Civil War and Guatemalan Civil War.
  - Randall Richard of The Providence Journal, for coverage of illegal drug activity in Colombia.
  - Richard Ben Cramer of The Philadelphia Inquirer, for coverage of the Afghanistan rebellion.
- Feature Writing:
  - **Teresa Carpenter of The Village Voice** for "Murder on a Day Pass", "Death of a Playmate", and "From Heroism to Madness: The Odyssey of the Man Who Shot Al Lowenstein".
  - (Prize was originally awarded to Janet Cooke of The Washington Post for "Jimmy's World", a story about an eight-year-old heroin addict. The award was returned after it was discovered that the story was a fabrication.)
  - Douglas J. Swanson of the Dallas Times Herald, for a collection of five stories.
  - Madeleine Blais of The Miami Herald, for a collection of stories including "Who's Going to Love Judith Bucknell?", about the murder of a Coconut Grove resident.
- Commentary:
  - **Dave Anderson of The New York Times**, for his commentary on sports.
  - Howard Rosenberg of the Los Angeles Times, for his television commentary.
  - Richard M. Cohen of The Washington Post
- Criticism:
  - **Jonathan Yardley of Washington Star**, for his book reviews.
  - Allan Temko of the San Francisco Chronicle, for his architecture criticism.
  - Henry Kisor of the Chicago Sun-Times, for his book reviews.
- Editorial Writing:
  - **No award given**
  - Jack Burby of the Los Angeles Times
  - Kirk Scharfenberg of The Boston Globe
  - Morris S. Thompson of The Miami Herald
- Editorial Cartooning:
  - **Mike Peters of the Dayton Daily News** (Ohio)
  - Jules Feiffer of The Village Voice
  - Paul Szep of The Boston Globe

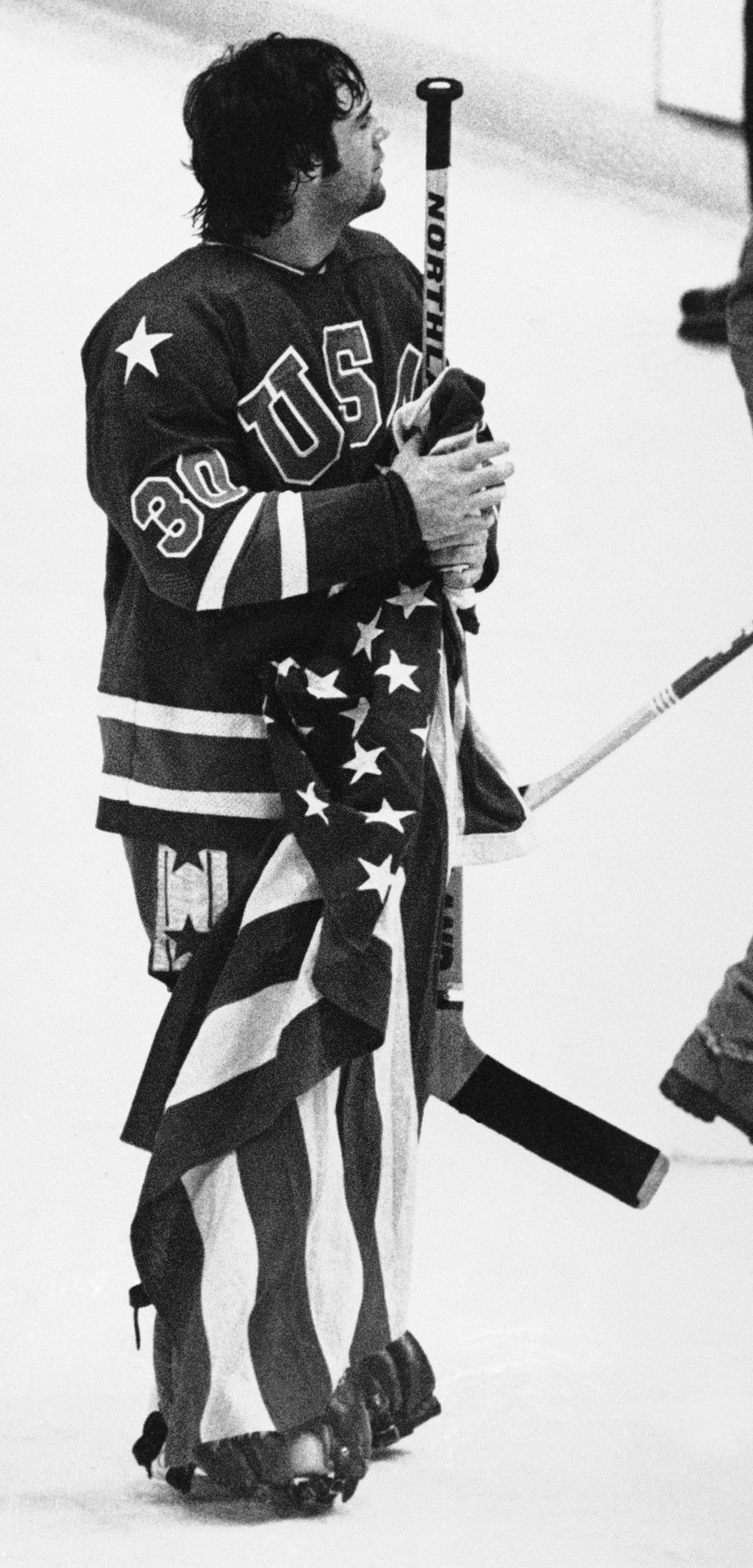
Spot News finalist photo of goalie Jim Craig

- Spot News Photography:
  - **Larry C. Price of the Fort Worth Star-Telegram**, for a collection of 10 photographs of the aftermath of the 1980 Liberian coup d'état, including the firing squad execution of 13 former officials.
  - David Tenenbaum of the Associated Press, for his picture of goalie Jim Craig clutching an American flag after his team won the gold medal in ice hockey at the 1980 Winter Olympics.
  - Roger A. Werth of the Longview Daily News (Washington), for his photographs of the eruption of Mount St. Helens.
- Feature Photography:
  - **Taro M. Yamasaki of the Detroit Free Press**, for his photographs of the Jackson State Prison.
  - Michael C. Hayman of the Flint Journal (Michigan), for his photographs of automobile workers.
  - Paul Beaver of the Jackson Clarion-Ledger (Mississippi), for his photographs for the report "Mississippi Delta: Empty Hands in a Fertile Land".

== Letters, Drama and Music Awards ==
- Fiction:
  - **A Confederacy of Dunces by John Kennedy Toole** (Louisiana State University Press)
  - Godric, by Frederick Buechner (Atheneum)
  - So Long, See You Tomorrow, by William Maxwell (Knopf)
- History:
  - **American Education: The National Experience, 1783-1876 by Lawrence A. Cremin** (Harper & Row)
  - A Search for Power: The 'Weaker Sex' in Seventeenth Century New England, by Lyle Koehler (Illinois)
  - Over Here: The First World War and American Society, by David M. Kennedy (Oxford)
- Biography or Autobiography:
  - **Peter the Great: His Life and World by Robert K. Massie** (Knopf)
  - Walt Whitman: A Life, by Justin Kaplan (Simon & Schuster)
  - Walter Lippmann and the American Century, by Ronald Steel (Little)
- Poetry:
  - **The Morning of the Poem by James Schuyler** (Farrar, Straus)
  - Selected Poems, by Mark Strand (Atheneum)
  - The Right Madness on Skye, by Richard Hugo (Norton)
- General Nonfiction:
  - **Fin-de-Siècle Vienna: Politics and Culture by Carl E. Schorske** (Knopf)
  - China Men, by Maxine Hong Kingston (Knopf)
  - Goodbye, Darkness: A Memoir of the Pacific War, by William Manchester (Little)
  - Southerners: A Journalist's Odyssey, by Marshall Frady (New American Library)
- Drama:
  - **Crimes of the Heart by Beth Henley**
- Music:
  - **No award given**
