= Dorothea Köhler =

German conductor and music educator (born 1943)

- Born: 1943 (age 82–83)
- Education: Martin Luther University of Halle-Wittenberg; University of Music and Theatre Leipzig
- Occupations: conductor music educator
- Honours: Handel Prize (1987)

Dorothea Köhler, née Dorothea Helling (born 1943) is a German woman conductor and music educator.

== Life ==
Born in Bockwitz, Köhler went to school at the EOS Lauchhammer and completed her Abitur there in 1961. She then studied music education / German language and literature at the Martin Luther University of Halle-Wittenberg, became choir inspector of the Stadtsingechor zu Halle in 1964 and was choir director of this third-oldest boys' choir in Germany and oldest boys' choir in central Germany from 1968 to 1990.

From 1972, Köhler completed external music studies at the University of Music and Theatre Leipzig with professors Olaf Koch and Rolf Reuter in the postgraduate course in orchestral conducting, which she completed in 1977 with music by Samuel Scheidt: Dances from Ludi musici, Friedrich Wilhelm Zachow: Triumph, Victoria (cantata), Wilhelm Friedemann Bach: Symphony in D major and Georg Friedrich Handel: Utrecht Jubilate as part of a diploma concert.

Under the direction of Köhler, the Stadtsingechor was successfully rebuilt into an internationally sought-after concert and oratorio choir. She laid the foundation for this in 1972 with the affiliation of the Stadtsingechor to the Hallesche Philharmonie, of which she became conductor. Two years later, she also took over the interim direction of the Halle Singakademie for one and a half years and in 1976 made the acquaintance of the Hungarian musicologist and recording director at Hungaroton András Székely. An already 40-year productive collaboration began.

In 1978, she was appointed Oberlehrer. Seven years later, artistic collaboration with Nicholas McGegan began; she successfully prepared the City Singing Choir for recordings on Hungaroton Budapest (Brockes Passions by Handel and Telemann).

For her outstanding achievements, Köhler was honoured with the Handel Prize in 1987 and promoted to Oberstudienrat in the same year.

In 1988, she founded the concert series "Kunst-Stunde beim Stadtsingechor" in Halle as a monthly concert (16 concert evenings until 1990). In 1989, the recordings for the record "Musik aus dem alten Halle" were made at VEB Deutsche Schallplatten (ETERNA).

In 1990, the year of the political reunification of Germany, Köhler's work as choir director of the Stadtsingechor finally came to an end, and in the same year she founded the choir studio cantamus in Halle/Saale with the men's choir bouquet vocalis Halle and the chamber choir cantamus Halle. It was thanks to her artistic reputation that the two ensembles of this choir studio were called upon to give important concerts and produce their first CD only a short time later.

Köhler worked full-time as a music teacher at the Gymnasium am Markt Hettstedt from 1991 to 1999 and then as a music teacher at the Georg Cantor Gymnasium until her retirement from teaching, in Halle. Here, thanks to her commitment, an agreement was reached with the director of the Halle Opera House to accompany the creation of the opera Cantor - die Vermessung des Unendlichen by Ingomar Grünauer (commissioned by the Halle Opera House) as a project of the music course level of the Georg Cantor Gymnasium.

Köhler premiered the cantata "Ohne Natur vergeht unser Leben" by Siegfried Bimberg and Hanna Helling as early as 1996 and recorded it a year later as part of a CD production. From 1998 onwards, the concert series "Kunst-Stunde" was revived with Köhler's chamber choir cantamus halle in the commode of the Kulturinsel Halle, later continued in the theatrale Halle and in the Konzerthalle St.-Ulrich-Kirche (until 2013 together with the male choir bouquet vocalis Halle). In 2014, the CD production "Halle, alte Musenstadt" followed with her kammerchor cantamus halle, members and graduates of the Stadtsingechor and the girls' choir of the August-Hermann-Francke-Schule, now Latina August Hermann Francke.

On the occasion of the 25th birthday of her chamber choir "cantamus halle", Köhler gave a festive concert in Halle on 17 October 2015. It was the 40th evening of the continuing unique concert series "Kunst-Stunde bei cantamus". The 42nd evening of the Kunst-Stunde at cantamus under the motto: Verleih uns Frieden - Glaube und Politik was a concert for the 900th anniversary of the Stadtsingechor zu Halle with the participation of male voices of the Stadtsingechor and graduates of the Stadtsingechor. The tenor soloist was the newly appointed choir director of the Stadtsingechor zu Halle, Clemens Flämig.

== Services ==
Under the direction of Köhler, the Stadtsingechor zu Halle was successfully rebuilt into an internationally sought-after concert and oratorio choir. Thanks to her commitment, an agreement was reached with the director of the Halle Opera House to accompany the creation of Ingomar Grünauer's opera Cantor - die Vermessung des Unendlichen (commissioned by the Halle Opera House) as a project of the music class of the Georg-Cantor-Gymnasium in Halle.

== Honours ==
In 1987 she was awarded the Handel Prize of the Halle district.

== Work ==
=== Publications in the Francke-Blättern ===
- Der Stadtsingechor (Teil 5), Francke-Blätter 3/1994, pp. 73–77
- Ein lauter Jubelruf erschallt! Dir, Liebe, Dank, doch dir, Musik, sei Preis ..., Francke-Blätter 2/1995, pp. 34–42
- kammerchor cantamus halle und der Stadtsingechor (zu) Halle, Francke-Blätter 2/2014, pp. 30–31
- Halle, alte Musenstadt – eine CD, die hallesche Klangfarben präsentiert, Francke-Blätter 3/2014, pp. 19–20
- Der kammerchor cantamus halle gratuliert dem Stadtsingechor zum 900. Geburtstag, Francke-Blätter 1/2016, pp. 38–52
- Der Parallelchor Der Mädchenchor der August-Hermann-Francke-Schule (1959 - 1982), Francke-Blätter 3/2016 – Special issue 2016/17

=== Recordings ===
- Weihnachten im Dom zu Halle, Kammerchor Cantamus Halle, Männerchor Bouquet Vocalis Halle, Solisten und Instrumentalisten, Dorthea Köhler (conductor). CD Membran International GmbH, 1993
- Musik aus dem alten Halle, Stadtsingechor zu Halle, Camerata musica, Berolina Quartet, Dorothea Köhler (conductor). CD Berlin Classics / Eterna (Label), Edel Classics Hamburg (Vertrieb), 1995
- Überall soll Freude sein, Mária Zádori (soprano), Martin Krumbiegel (tenor), Jörg Hempel (baritone), Peter Burkhardt (organ), Capella Savaria (direction: Pál Németh), kammerchor cantamus halle & Männerchor bouquet vocalis Halle (direction: Dorothea Köhler). BHCD 2 Bridgehead Pittsburg/Budapest, 1995
- Halle, alte Musenstadt, Absolventen des Stadtsingechores Halle, Dorothea Köhler, cantamus & Freunde. CD Klangfarben & Karrieren, 2014
