= Axel Köhler =

German countertenor and opera director (born 1959)

Axel Köhler (born 1960 in Schwarzenberg, Saxony, East Germany) is a German countertenor and opera director. In 1994, he won the Handel Prize. Since 2009, he has been Artistic Director of the Halle Opera House.

== Early life ==
Axel Köhler studied violin pedagogy and singing at the Hochschule für Musik Carl Maria von Weber Dresden. In 1987 he made his singing debut as Eustazio in Peter Konwitschny's production of Rinaldo. A number of demanding countertenor roles followed, especially in Handel's operas, as Köhler guested at international festivals and concerts, and in compact disc, radio and opera productions.

== Singing career ==
Since 1984, Köhler has belonged to the ensemble Halle an der Saale, first as a baritone and later as a countertenor. In 1995, Köhler sang at the Royal Opera House in London at the premiere of Arianna by Alexander Goehr. In 1998 he took over the title role in the world premiere of Farinelli by Siegfried Matthus. In 2001, he played the devil in Detlev Glanert's comic opera Scherz, Satire, Ironie und tiefere Bedeutung at its premiere. He sang the role of Ajib in L'Upupa by Hans Werner Henze in 2003 at the Salzburg Festival premiere. In 2006, Köhler designed the title role in Cantor – Die Vermessung des Unendlichen by Ingomar Grünauer, a world premiere in which he sang as a baritone.

In 2005, Köhler sang at the Semper Opera in Dresden in the role of Poro in Johann Adolf Hasse's opera Cleofide. He sang with the Bavarian State Opera for Poppea and Rinaldo, the Hamburg State Opera for Poppea. He also sang in Monteverdi's L'Orfeo in the part of La Speranza and the Polinesso in Handel's Ariodante. In 2011, he appeared as The Roasted Swan in Carl Orff's Carmina Burana. From 2007 to 2010, he appeared as Artemis in Hans Werner Henze's Phaedra in Berlin, Brussels, Vienna, Frankfurt and London. Subsequently, he played the part of Trasimede in Handel's Alceste at the Leipzig Opera. He also sang on the Dresden Theatre Barge, the Opera Hall and at the Rheingau Music Festival in the cabaret program Greife wacker nach der Sünde.

As a concert singer, Köhler worked with early music ensembles and conductors René Jacobs, Marcus Creed and Howard Arman. Köhler has released four solo CDs on the Capriccio and Berlin Classics labels.

== Directing career ==
Since 2000, Axel Koehler also worked as a director. He made his debut with Monteverdi's L'Incoronazione di Poppea, and in 2001 followed with Handel's Rodrigo. In 2005 he followed with A Midsummer Night's Dream by Benjamin Britten. Koehler's staging of Handel's opera Teseo was performed in 2003 in Germany, Switzerland and England.

In 2006, he staged opera air productions of Amadigi in Dresden and Alceste in Halle. In 2007 he brought Tom Johnson's Riemannoper to the stage of the basement theater of the Leipzig Opera House, and at the Mecklenburg State Theatre Schwerin, he directed Mozart's Don Giovanni. In 2008 he presented at the Dresden State Operetta's production of Mozart's Magic Flute. For the Chamber Opera Schloss Rheinsberg, he produced a White Lady by François Adrien Boieldieu. As a co-production of the Academy of Music and drama in Dresden, he brought Monteverdi's Poppea to the stage.

In 2009, Koehler staged Argenore by Wilhelmine of Bayreuth at the Margravial Opera House, Lehár's The Land of Smiles on the outdoor stage at Augsburg and Mozart's Magic Flute at the Innsbruck State Theatre. In 2010, these were followed by productions of Emmerich Kálmán's Countess Maritza at the Dresden State Operetta, Abraham's The Flower of Hawaii and Verdi's Macbeth at the Halle Opera House. In 2011, he produced Emmerich Kálmán's Countess Maritza and Telemann's The Patience of Socrates at the State Theatre of Gärtnerplatz, Munich. In 2012, Axel Köhler was invited by the Opera director of the Semperoper, Eytan Pessen, to direct numerous productions. In 2012 Köhler produced "Schwanda the Bagpiper” by Jaromír Weinberger and Domenico Sarro Dorina e Nibbio at the Semperoper in Dresden. In the 2013–2014 season he will direct Bizet's Carmen and Martini's L'impresario delle Canarie there.

== Awards ==
Axel Köhler was honored in 1994 for his performances with the Handel Festival Prize. In 1998, he received the 1999 Prize of the Critics' Berliner Zeitung.

== Sources ==
- Official website archived on 2016-03-10
- Axel Köhler at Bühnen Halle
- https://web.archive.org/web/20121209083717/http://www.semperoper.de/oper/premieren/detailansicht/details/57961/besetzung/8311.html#Besetzung
