= The Transformation of the School =

1961 book by Lawrence Cremin

- Author: Lawrence Cremin
- Subject: History of education in the United States, progressive education
- Published: 1961 (Alfred A. Knopf)
- Pages: 387

The Transformation of the School: Progressivism in American Education, 1876–1957 is a history of the American Progressive Education movement written by historian Lawrence Cremin and published by Alfred A. Knopf in 1961.
