= Ore Mountain Club =

Hiking club

Erzgebirgsverein e.V. (Ore Mountain Club)
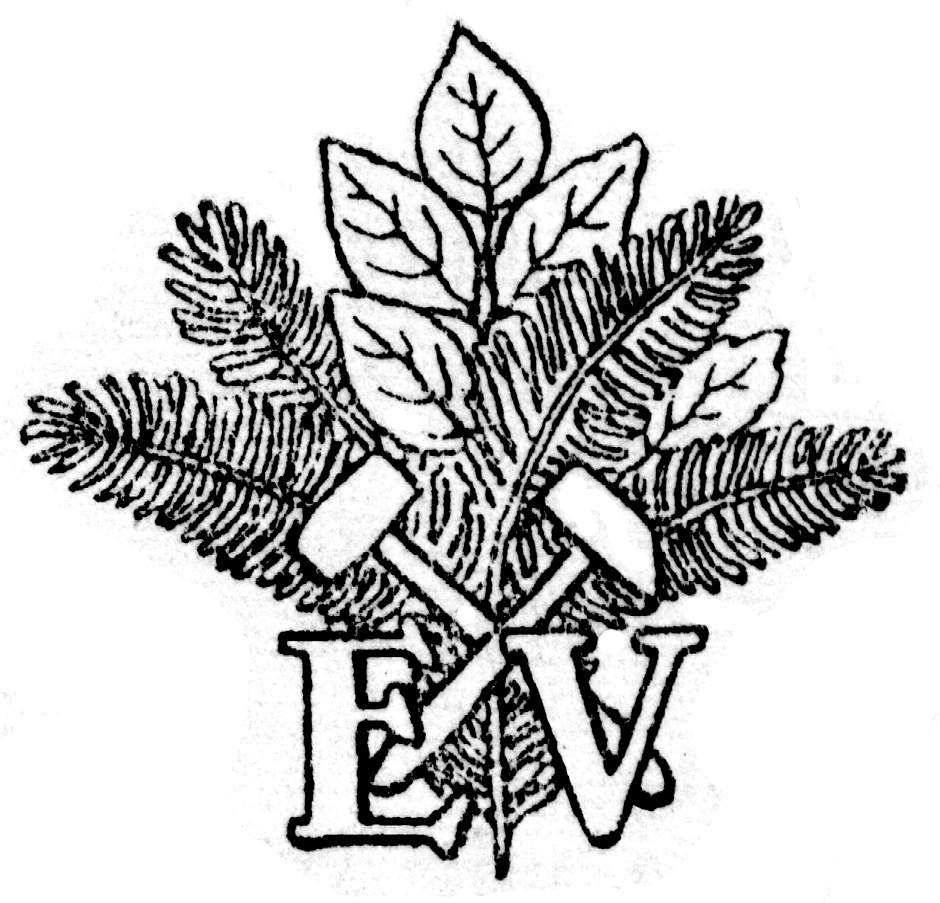
- Founded: 5 May 1878 (Schneeberg); 19 June 1955 (Frankfurt/Main - west); 21 April 1990 (Zschorlau - newly founded in the east); 12 October 1991 (Eibenstock - reunification)
- Based in: Schneeberg
- President: Dr. Gabriele Lorenz (1st federal chairwoman)
- Branches: 62
- Members: 63 (1878); 28,000 (1929); 3,859 (2008)
- Website: http://www.erzgebirgsverein.de

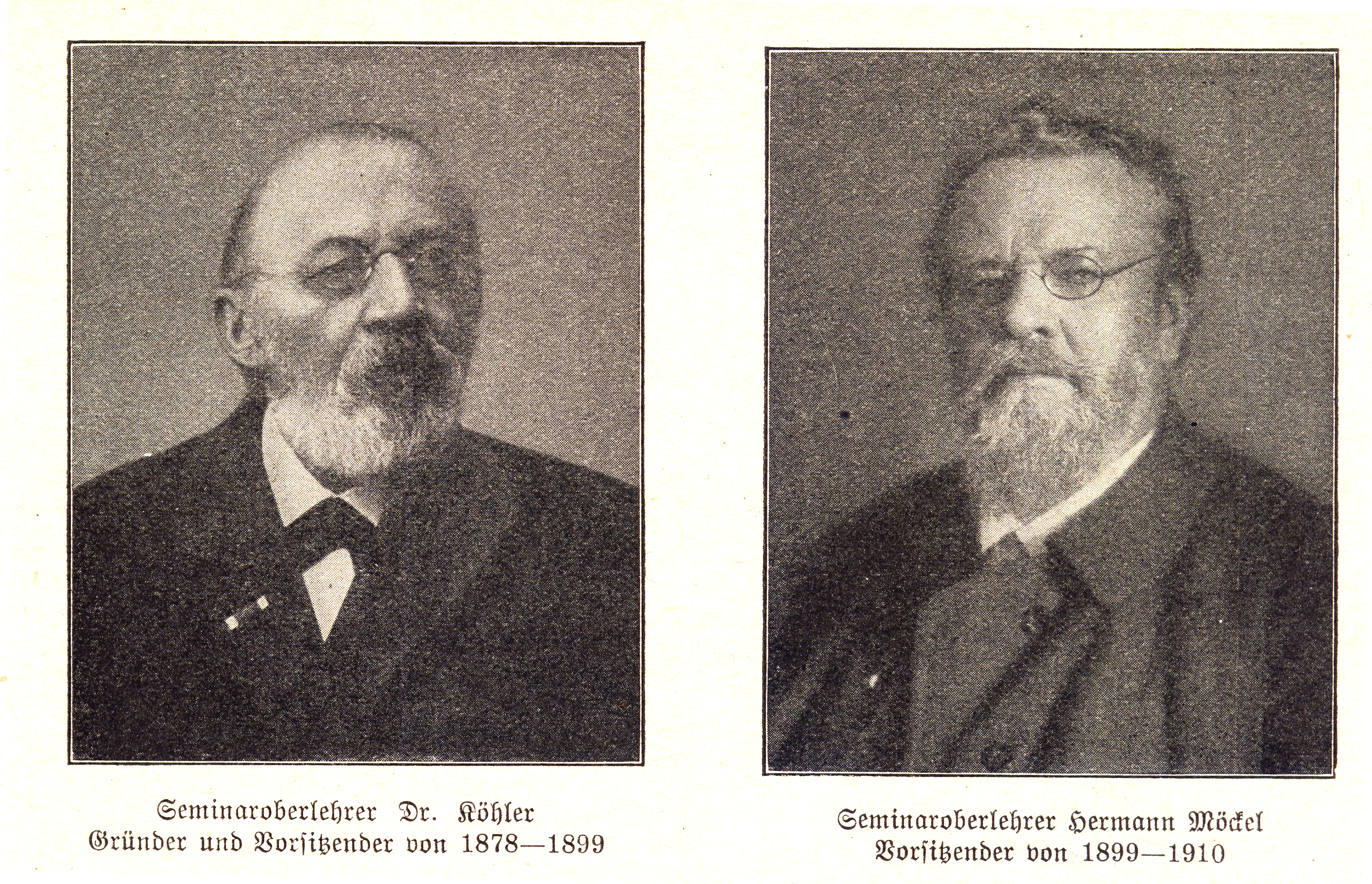
The first chairmen, Köhler and Moeckel

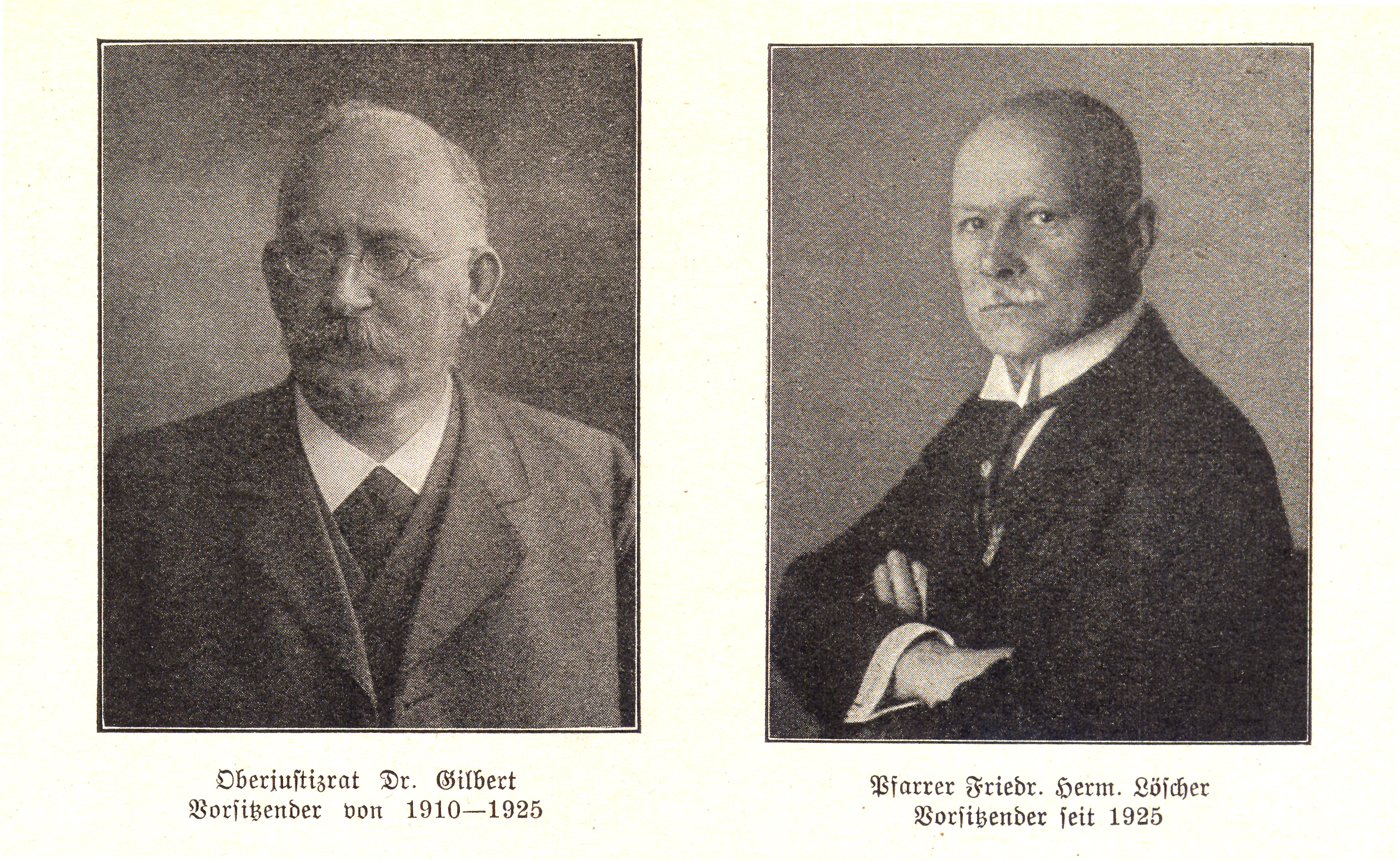
Co-chairs Gilbert and Löscher

The Ore Mountain Club (German: Erzgebirgsverein) is one of the oldest and most tradition-steeped local history, mountain and hiking clubs in Germany. The club was founded in 1878. After the Second World War the club and its many branches were banned by the East German authorities, but it was refounded in West Germany in Frankfurt am Main in 1955. Only after the political events of Die Wende in 1990 was it newly founded in the Ore Mountains. At the end of 2008 the club had over 3,859 members in 61 branches. Before 1945 there were more than 25,000 members. In 1929 the Ore Mountain Club even had over 28,000 members in 156 branches and managed several accommodation houses on the Fichtelberg near Oberwiesenthal and the Schwartenberg between Seiffen and Neuhausen/Erzgeb.

Today the Ore Mountain Club has 12 woodcarving and 30 bobbin lacemaking groups (Schnitzgruppen and Klöppelgruppen). In 2008 its members did 220,000 hours of voluntary work. The club's trail rangers look after 4,042 kilometres of hiking trails in the Ore Mountains with 6,136 signposts, 2,346 benches and 377 refuge huts.

== History ==
=== Foundation and club structure ===
The Ore Mountain Club was founded in the Bahnhofseiche pub in Aue-Zelle by 63 local history friends of the upper middle classes on 5 May 1878 at the instigation of Ernst Köhler, who also acted as its first club chairman. Whilst it was still in its first year, in 1878, the first branches were formed in Schneeberg, Eibenstock, Schlema, Lößnitz, Selva, Schwarzenberg, Hartenstein, Marienberg, Glauchau-Waldenburg and Dippoldiswalde. Then followed the establishment of branches outside the actual catchment area, e.g. in Berlin (1910), Hamburg (1933), Frankfurt (1936) and Hanover (1936). In 1932, the Ore Mountain Club had 25,000 members, the second largest association of its kind in Germany after the Alpine Club.

To achieve its goal of making the Ore Mountains better known to hiking enthusiasts from near and far, the Ore Mountain Club built about 25 observation towers and mountain inns in the first 50 years of its existence. Other early activities were the signing of hiking trails and the publication of maps. As a result, tourism in the Ore Mountains in the late 19th century was heavily promoted. Since 1855, the Ore Mountain Club has belonged to the Association of German Mountain and Hiking Clubs ('Verband der deutschen Gebirgs- und Wandervereine).

=== Between 1920 and 1933 ===
Under President Friedrich Hermann Löscher the Ore Mountain Club also turned to the study of local history and folklore. Löscher said: "The Ore Mountain Club does not just want to be the tourist office or tower building club; rather it also wants to open up its homeland in terms of folklore, ... wants to carry out research work into the people's soul, language, customs and way of life." Many valuable publications in the Glückauf-Verlag followed, including contributions by meritorious local historian Walter Frobe, Johannes Langer and Gerhard Heilfurth.

== Sources ==
- Das schöne Erzgebirge im Sommer und Winter; 138 pages. Schneeberg, 1929; Druck C. M. Gärtner, Schwarzenberg
- Gerhard Schlegel, Erich Reuther, Dieter Schräber: 125 Jahre Erzgebirgsverein - eine Festschrift. Schneeberg, 2003 ISBN 3-931770-41-9
