= Melk =

- Municipality
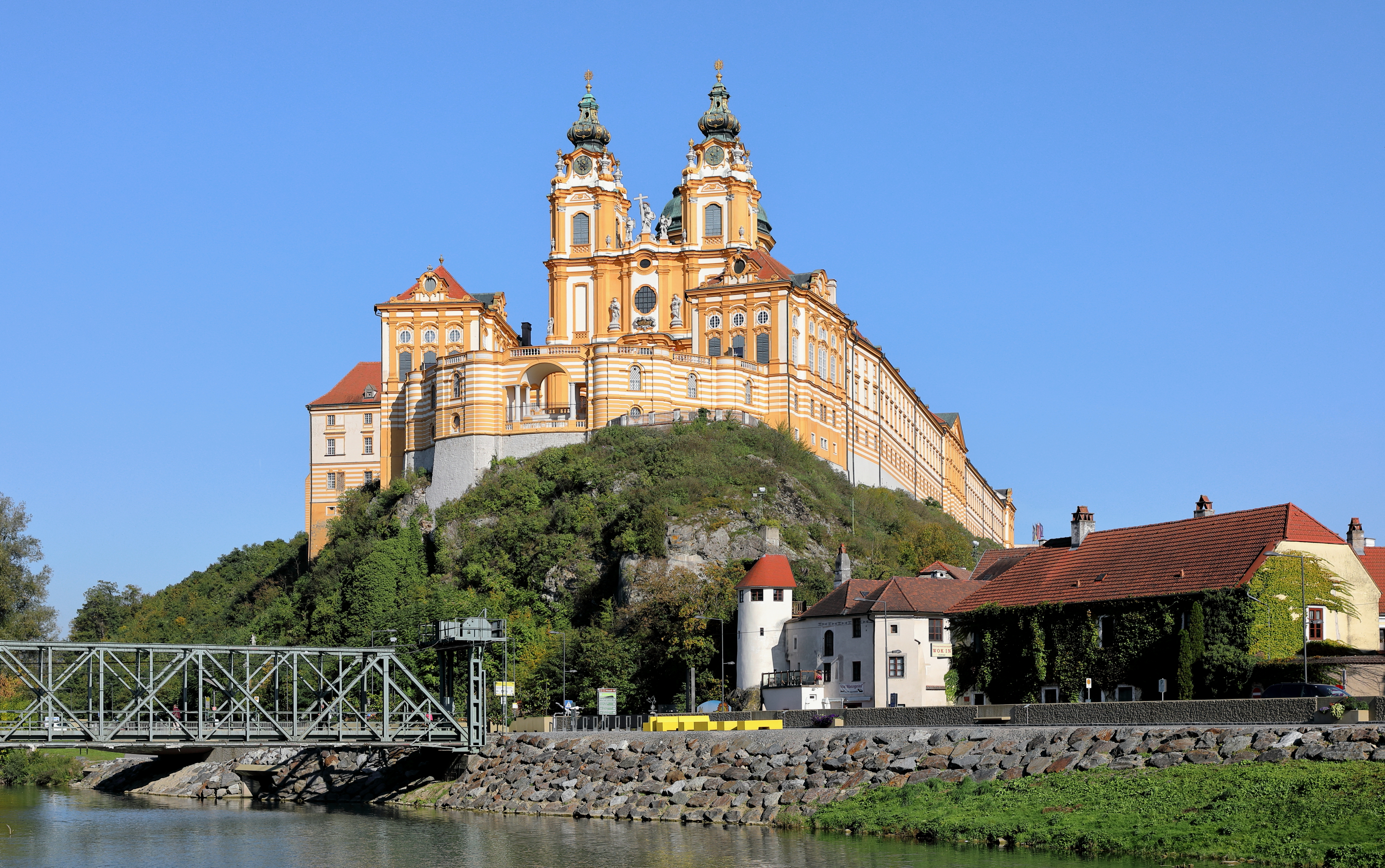
- Melk Abbey

- Coat of arms

- Location within Austria
- Coordinates: 48°14′N 15°21′E
- Country: Austria
- State: Lower Austria
- District: Melk

Government
  - Mayor: Patrick Strobl (ÖVP)

Area
  - Total: 25.7 km^{2} (9.9 sq mi)
- Elevation: 213 m (699 ft)

Population (2018-01-01)
  - Total: 5,529
  - Density: 215/km^{2} (557/sq mi)
- Time zone: UTC+1 (CET)
  - Summer (DST): UTC+2 (CEST)
- Postal code: 3390
- Area code: 0 27 52
- Vehicle registration: ME
- Website: www.melk.gv.at

Melk (German pronunciation: [mɛlk]; older spelling: Mölk) is a city in the Austrian state of Lower Austria, next to the Wachau valley along the Danube. Melk has a population of 5,257 (as of 2012). It is best known as the site of a massive baroque Benedictine monastery named Melk Abbey.

The town is first mentioned as Medilica in 831 in a donation of Louis the German; the name is from a Slavic word for 'border.' The area around Melk was given to Leopold I, Margrave of Austria, in the year 976 to serve as a buffer between the Magyars to east and Bavaria to the west. In 996 mention was first made of an area known as Ostarrîchi, which is the origin of the word Österreich (German for Austria). The bluff which holds the current monastery held a Babenberger castle until the site was given to Benedictine monks from nearby Lambach by Leopold II, in 1089. Melk received market rights in 1227 and became a municipality in 1898. During the Holocaust, there was a Nazi concentration camp at Melk, which functioned as a subcamp of Mauthausen.

In a very small area, Melk contains architectural variety from many centuries.

== Notable sights ==
The Forsthaus accommodates the city archives and the tourist information office. Beside the Forsthaus the Zaglauergasse meets with the Wiener Straße. The Zaglauergasse is restricted on one side by remnants of the ancient city wall. At this junction one could find the Wiener Tor (Vienna Gate) until 1874. It has been, along with the Linzer Tor (Linz Gate) on the other side of the city, one of the two entrances to Melk throughout the centuries.

After several metres, the Wiener Straße opens to the restored Rathausplatz, which got its name from the Rathaus built in 1575. The facade of the town hall was redesigned 150 years ago and the highly elaborate entrance door, made of wood and copper, is the town hall's most outstanding feature.

To its left is the former Lebzelterhaus, which dates back to 1657 and which nowadays is a pharmacy. To the right is a secular building from the Middle Ages. The Kolomanbrunnen market fountain, which is a gift from the abbey to the city, is in the centre of the Rathausplatz. On the top of the fountain the statue of St. Koloman can be seen.

The old bread store with its tiny towers is about 400 years old and is still covered with the original shingle roof. Behind the old bread store extends the oldest lane in Melk, the Sterngasse, which used to be the main street of the town. The interesting wall paintings on the houses indicate what they used to be. Some other houses contain fascinating courtyards.

The hidden Haus am Stein ('house at the rock') is the oldest building of Melk, built during the 15th century. Its facade is covered by a protected ancient vine. At the arm of the Danube river, parts of the former city walls and the Round Tower can be recognised. Following the Nibelungenlände and passing the Salzhof, the visitor reaches the Schiffsmeisterhaus with its high water level marks on the facade. The Danube reached 15.8 metres above the usual water level in 1501.

The Haus auf dem Stein ('house on the rock') was built less than 50 years after this high water disaster. It was used as an atelier by the Austrian painter Walter Prinzl. The counterpart of the Wiener Tor, the Linzer Tor, was located at the end of the Linzer Straße. Neither gate exists anymore, but historical illustrations can be found at the city archives. At the corner of the Stadtgraben (moat), there is the defensive tower, where parts of it are still in original condition.

The Old Post Office is at the end of the moat, which was built in 1792. Its facade is decorated with a beautiful relief created at the end of the Baroque period. The Old Post Office is now used as a convention centre. The church court is dominated by the Gothic Pfarrkirche (parish church). Designed in the late Gothic period and embedded in the northern facade is the Kalvarienberggruppe, a significant sculpture. Before the main road connects to the Rathausplatz, a tablet commemorates the great Austrian composer Anton Bruckner.

About 5 kilometres (3.1 mi) south of the town is the renowned Renaissance castle Schallaburg.

During World War II, a subcamp of Mauthausen concentration camp was located here. Today the former crematorium is a museum while the rest of the camp was part of what is now the Birago barracks of the Austrian Army.

In 1950, the first official women's Austrian Chess Championship was held in Melk, the winner of which was Salome Reischer.

== People ==
- Gertrude of Babenberg, Duchess of Bohemia (c. 1118 – 1150), married to Vladislaus II, Duke and King of Bohemia
- Ingomar Grünauer (born 1938), composer
- Maximilian Stadler (1748–1833), composer

== In fiction ==
The co-protagonist of Umberto Eco's The Name of the Rose is Adso of Melk, a Benedictine novice traveling in 1327.
