= Frauke Köhler =

German lawyer (born 1983)

Frauke Köhler (born 1983) is a German lawyer. She is public prosecutor at the Federal Court of Justice (Bundesgerichtshof, BGH) in Karlsruhe, Germany. She is also head of the PR and a spokesperson of Germany's Public Prosecutor General at the BGH.
