= Marc Koehler =

Dutch architect of Portuguese origin (born 1977)

Marc Koehler (born 1977, Naarden) is a Dutch architect of Portuguese origin.

Koehler studied at the Delft University of Technology and, in 2004, he became a staff member and lecturer at the University's Faculty of Architecture. In 2005, he began his research based design office in Amsterdam, which became known for its criticism and design proposals for private houses in the Netherlands. In 2009 Marc Koehler Architects won several international design competitions, such as the 1st prize in the Oporto waterfront idea competition (Portugal), the 1st prize in the Belgium Open Call competition for the community centre in Loker (Belgium) and won an honorable mention in the idea competition for the new Faculty of Architecture of the Technical University of Delft (Netherlands. Koehler is actively engaged in the contemporary architectural debate and his work is widely published.
