= Lawrence A. Cremin =

American historian

- Born: Lawrence Arthur Cremin; October 31, 1925; Manhattan, New York
- Died: September 4, 1990 (aged 64); New York City)

Education
- Education: Columbia University; City College of New York

Philosophical work
- Institutions: Teachers College, Columbia University
- Main interests: American educational history

Lawrence Arthur Cremin (October 31, 1925 – September 4, 1990) was an American educational historian and administrator.

== Biography ==
Cremin attended Townsend Harris High School in Queens, and then received his B.A. and M.A. from City College of New York. His Ph.D. is from Columbia University in 1949. He began teaching at the Teachers College, Columbia University in New York City. He married Charlotte Raup, the daughter of two other Columbia professors: educational psychologist Robert Bruce Raup of Teachers College, and economist Clara Eliot of Barnard College.

In 1961 he became the Frederick A. P. Barnard Professor of Education and a member of Columbia's history department, directing the Teachers College's Institute of Philosophy and Politics of Education in 1965–1974 before becoming the college's 7th president in 1974–1984, after which he returned to teaching and research.

At the Teachers College, Cremin broadened the study of American educational history beyond the school-centered analysis dominant in the 1940s with a more comprehensive approach that examined other agencies and institutions that educated children, integrating the study of education with other historical subfields, and comparing education across international boundaries.

Cremin was a member of both the American Academy of Arts and Sciences and the American Philosophical Society.

In 1985 while remaining on the Columbia faculties, he assumed the presidency of the Spencer Foundation, a Chicago-based educational research organization.

Cremin won the 1962 Bancroft Prize in American History for his book The Transformation of the School: Progressivism in American Education, 1876–1957 (1961), which described the anti-intellectual emphasis on non-academic subjects and non-authoritarian teaching methods that occurred as a result of mushrooming enrollment. He was awarded the 1981 Pulitzer Prize for History for American Education: The National Experience, 1783-1876 (1980).

In 1990 Cremin published Popular Education and Its Discontents before dying of a sudden heart attack.

== Debates ==
The historiography of education turned bitter in the 1960s, as New Left radical historians denounced the history of American education as a failure when it came to promoting democracy and equality. Cremin avoided the debates, although in 1977 he did make clear his support for the traditional liberal interpretation. While admitting that occasionally educational institutions, being human, “have been guilty of their full share of evil, venality, and failure" he argued:

Contrary to the drift of a good deal of scholarly opinion during the past ten years, I happen to believe that on balance the American education system has contributed significantly to the advancement of liberty, equality, and fraternity, in that complementarity and tension that mark the relations among them in a free society....The aspirations of American education have been more noble than base, and that its performance over the past two centuries has been more liberating of a greater diversity of human energies and potentialities than has been the case in most other eras and in most other places.

== Interviews ==
- Does Going to School ‘Interrupt’ a Child’s Education? - The Open Mind - April 4, 1976
- Teacher in America, Part I - The Open Mind - May 21, 1988
- Teacher in America, Part II - The Open Mind - May 21, 1988
- High Tech and Our 'Education President' - The Open Mind - January 22, 1989
- Popular Education and Its Discontents - The Open Mind - March 17, 1990

== Publications ==
- The American Common School: An Historic Conception. New York: Bureau of Publications, Teachers College, Columbia University, 1951, OCLC 01330861
- The Transformation of the School: Progressivism in American Education, 1876–1957. Knopf. 1961. OCLC 175047.
- The Wonderful World of Ellwood Patterson Cubberley: An Essay On The Historiography of American Education. New York: Bureau of Publications, Teachers College, Columbia University, 1965.
- The Genius of American Education. University of Pittsburgh Press, 1965. LCCN 65–28146
- American Education: The Colonial Experience, 1607–1783. Harper & Row. 1970.
- Public Education. Basic Books. 1976.
- Traditions of American Education. Basic Books. 1977.
- American Education: The National Experience, 1783-1876. Harper & Row. 1980.
- American Education: The Metropolitan Experience, 1876–1980. Harper & Row. 1988.
- Popular Education and its Discontents. Harper & Row. 1990. ISBN 978-0-06-016270-2.

== Bibliography ==
- Cohen, Sol (1998). "Lawrence A. Cremin: Hostage To History". Historical Studies in Education. 10#1-2: 180–204. doi:10.32316/hse/rhe.v10i1.1558. ISSN 0843-5057. (fulltext)
- Finn, Chester E. (June 1, 1977), "Traditions of American Education, by Lawrence A. Cremin", Commentary (book review)
- Howe, Daniel W. "Review: The History of Education as Cultural History" History of Education Quarterly (1982) 22#2 pp. 205–214 review of American Education: The National Experience, 1783-1876
- Kelly, Matthew Gardner. "The mythology of schooling: the historiography of American and European education in comparative perspective." Paedagogica Historica 50.6 (2014): 756–773.
- Rury, John L. (1991). "Transformation in perspective: Lawrence Cremin's Transformation of the school". History of Education Quarterly. 31 (1): 67–76. doi:10.2307/368783. JSTOR 368783. (book review)
- Parker, Franklin (1993), Lawrence Arthur Cremin (1925-90), US Educational Historian and President, Teachers College, Columbia University (1974-84): Contributions to Higher Education (PDF) – via ERIC (fulltext)

=== Primary sources ===
- Houts, Paul L. (1975), "A Conversation with Lawrence A. Cremin", National Elementary Principal, vol. 54, pp. 23–35, ISSN 0027-920X
- "History: 'A Lamp To Light the Present'", Education Week, vol. 7, no. 25, March 16, 1988 (interview with Cremin)
