= Georg Cantor Gymnasium =

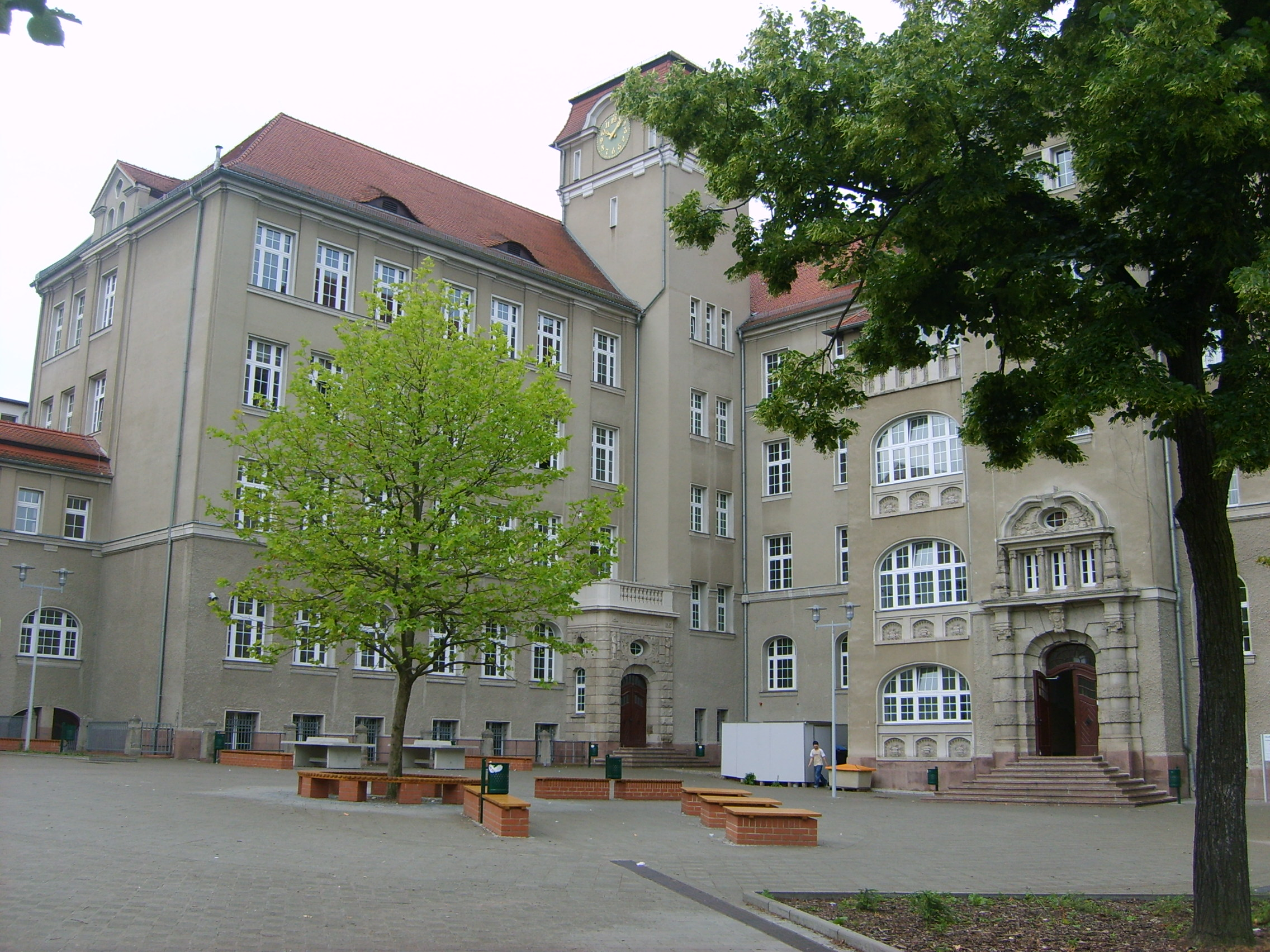

Location
- Torstraße 13; Halle, 06110; Germany
- Coordinates: 51°28′24″N 11°57′57″E

Information
- Type: Gymnasium
- Opened: 1988
- Head teacher: Dr. B. Gorsler
- Staff: 58
- Enrollment: 542
- Classes: 5-12
- Average class size: 22
- Language: German

The Georg Cantor Gymnasium is a German gymnasium in Halle (Saale) with a special focus on mathematics and the sciences (specialist school). The all-day school was founded in 1989. It is attended by just over 500 students and has a staff of about 60 teachers.

== Location ==
Since 2007 the school has been located in the center of the city of Halle (Saale). The school building, built in 1905, was used until 2005 by the Torgymnasium. The now unused halls of residence are placed about 30 minutes (by tram) away from the school – next to the former school building, which was in use from 1989 to 2007. As its structural condition worsened, the school moved to its current location. After the renovation between the years 2005–2007 the school got new room setups, technical equipment and a new schoolyard, which is small, but nevertheless offers the students many seats and sports activities like basketball or table tennis.

== Special Profile ==
The school’s main emphasis is on mathematics, the sciences, and technical education. There are more lessons in these subjects compared with other grammar schools in Germany, and the students also regularly take part in competitions in these fields. Georg-Cantor-Gymnasium has a modified timetable which includes more lessons in the profile subjects (Mathematics, Physics, Chemistry, Biology, Computer Science and Astronomy). That way the students get the opportunity to learn more about additional topics which are not part of the normal curriculum. Students can also join special clubs or work on science projects after school. Furthermore, the students take part in practical science training and have the chance to write a scientific paper on an extra-curricular topic of their choice in year 10.

== Foreign Languages ==
In year 5 the students continue English as their first foreign language, which they normally start in Primary School. In year 7 they take up a second one, which they can choose between Latin and French for. Additionally, students can take Spanish as their third foreign language in year 9. Also students can choose any language for their A-levels. The school has many language clubs where interested students can take languages like Spanish, Russian, Chinese or Latin as an extra-curricular activity, even though they are only partially active.

== Admission ==
According to Saxony-Anhalt’s school regulations an entrance exam for schools with special profiles is obligatory. The exam includes a general aptitude test and a mathematical test paper. Places are offered depending on these test results as well as the student’s last school report. Students do the exam in the second term of year 4.

== A typical school day ==
The school day starts at 7.30 am. Typically, years 5 and 6 have 6 lessons a day, with each lesson lasting 45 minutes. Their school day ends at 1.05 pm. At 1.30 pm the afternoon lessons start – mostly the older students take part in these and they finish at about 4 pm at the latest. There is a break after each lesson. In the breaks after the second and fourth lesson students are expected to go to the schoolyard. Breaks at 11.00 am and 1.05 pm are for eating lunch in the school canteen. After school students can take part in different clubs where they can follow their special interests. Furthermore, they get the chance to do their homework in a common room at school.

== Achievements ==
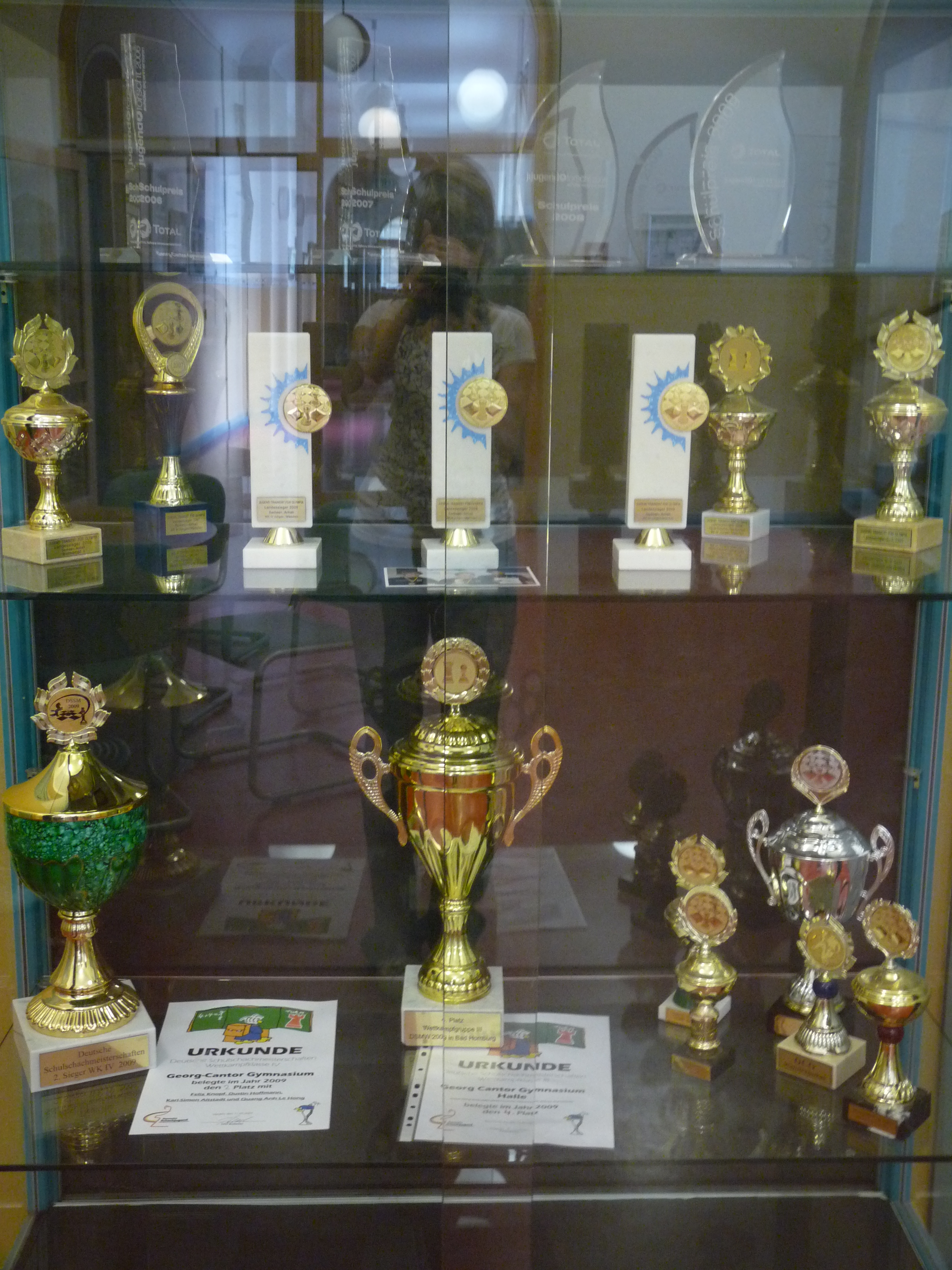
Recent awards and trophies won by GCG students

Year after year, students of the Georg-Cantor-Gymnasium are successful in national and international competitions. They often win prizes in science and mathematics contests, e.g. the regional and national Mathematics Olympiad or the International Junior Science Olympiad (IJSO). However, students do not only excel in scientific competitions, but are also successful in foreign language contests.
