= American Education =

1980 nonfiction book by Lawrence A. Cremin

American Education: The National Experience, 1783–1876
- Author: Lawrence A. Cremin
- Genre: History
- Publisher: Harper & Row
- Publication date: 1980
- Publication place: United States
- Pages: 607
- Awards: Pulitzer Prize for History
- ISBN: 978-0-06-010912-7

American Education: The National Experience, 1783–1876 is a 1980 nonfiction book by American historian Lawrence A. Cremin, published by Harper & Row. The book is the second volume in Cremin's trilogy on US schools throughout the nation's history. In 1981, the book won the Pulitzer Prize for History.

The book is treated as a failure by Sol Cohen and most reviewers. They argued it covers too much ground– all of cultural history– too thinly.
