= Köhler disease =

Bone disorder of the foot

- Other names: Aseptic necrosis of the tarsal bone, Kohler's Disease of the Tarsal Navicular, Osteochondritis of tarsal/metatarsal bone
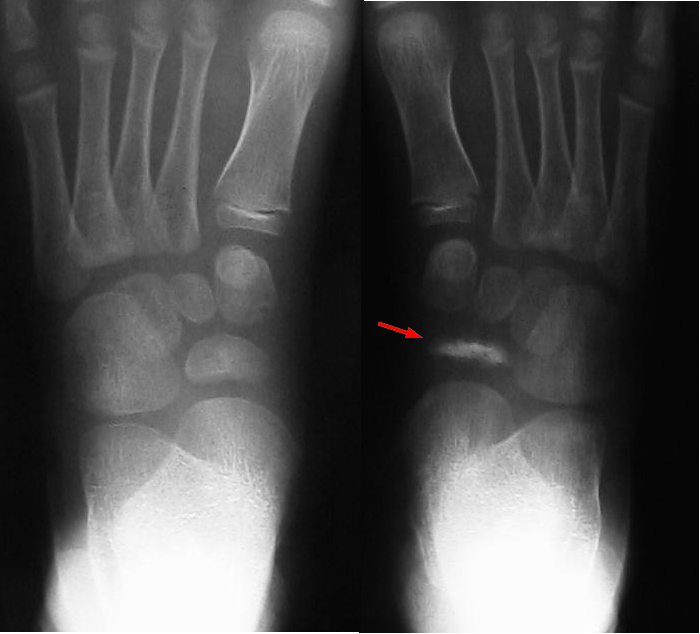
- Unilateral Köhler disease in an 8 year old girl.
- Specialty: Orthopedics
- Usual onset: 6-9 years old
- Treatment: Below knee cast, rest, NSAIDs, analgesics
- Prognosis: Good, with very few complications if treated

Köhler disease (also spelled "Kohler" and referred to in some texts as Kohler disease I) is a rare bone disorder of the foot found in children between six and nine years of age. The disease typically affects boys, but it can also affect girls. It was first described in 1908 by Alban Köhler (1874–1947), a German radiologist.

Dr. A. Köhler noted that children with foot pain displayed characteristics, within their x-rays, of irregularity in growth and development of the tarsal navicular bone in the foot. Furthermore, Köhler disease is known to affect five times more boys than girls and typically, only one foot is affected. The disease was then found to belong to a group of conditions called osteochondroses, which disturb bone growth at ossification centres which occurs during bone development.

It is caused when the navicular bone temporarily loses its blood supply. As a result, tissue in the bone dies and the bone collapses. When treated, it causes no long-term problems in most cases although rarely can return in adults. As the navicular bone gets back to normal, symptoms typically abate.

== Symptoms ==
Affected individuals experience pain and swelling in the middle part of the foot and usually limp as a result. Patients who walk with a limp tend to walk with increased weight on the lateral side of the foot. Also, there can be tenderness over the navicular. Patients often complain of pain over the apex. An X-ray of both feet is used to diagnose disease. The affected foot tends to have a sclerotic and flattened navicular bone. Symptoms may last for a few weeks or may continue to be present for up to 2 years. An indication of the symptoms residing is the resolution of the acute inflammation and obvious healing of the foot. This means that the affected bone and the Tarsal Navicular begin to regain their normal size, density and structure.

== Cause ==
The cause of Köhler's disease, has thus far, been declared unknown by scientists. However, it is suspected that possible causes may be caused by strain on the foot and the blood vessels associated with it, before the bone is fully able to grow into its adult form (ossification). This bone ossification usually begins within the first 18 to 24 months of a female's life and the first 24 to 30 months of a male's life. Ossification will occur more slowly on the tarsal navicular bone than on other bones of the foot. This causes an overall loss of blood supply in the areas surrounding, as a result of the compression. Furthermore, some scientists have suggested that genetic factors could play a significant role in the development of the disease, however no direct causation has been identified, nor a disease-causing gene.

== Diagnosis ==
Diagnosis is made on the basis of history and a high index of suspicion. On examination there is tenderness to palpation on navicular head. Plain X-ray would show a navicular bone that is wafer-thin, with bony collapse. There will be a loss of trabecular pattern in the bone, and increased radiodensity. It is sometimes possible to see soft tissue swelling around the affected navicular bone in plain X-ray.

== Treatment ==
Treatment usually involves resting the affected foot, taking pain relievers and trying to avoid putting pressure on the foot. In acute cases, the patient is often fitted with a cast that stops below the knee. The cast is usually worn for 6 to 8 weeks. After the cast is taken off, some patients are prescribed arch support for about 6 months. Also, moderate exercise is often beneficial, and physical therapy may help as well.

Prognosis for children with this disease is very good. It may persist for some time, but most cases are resolved within two years of the initial diagnosis. Although in most cases no permanent damage is done, some will have lasting damage to the foot.
