= Ana Luiza Koehler =

Brazilian comics artist and architect

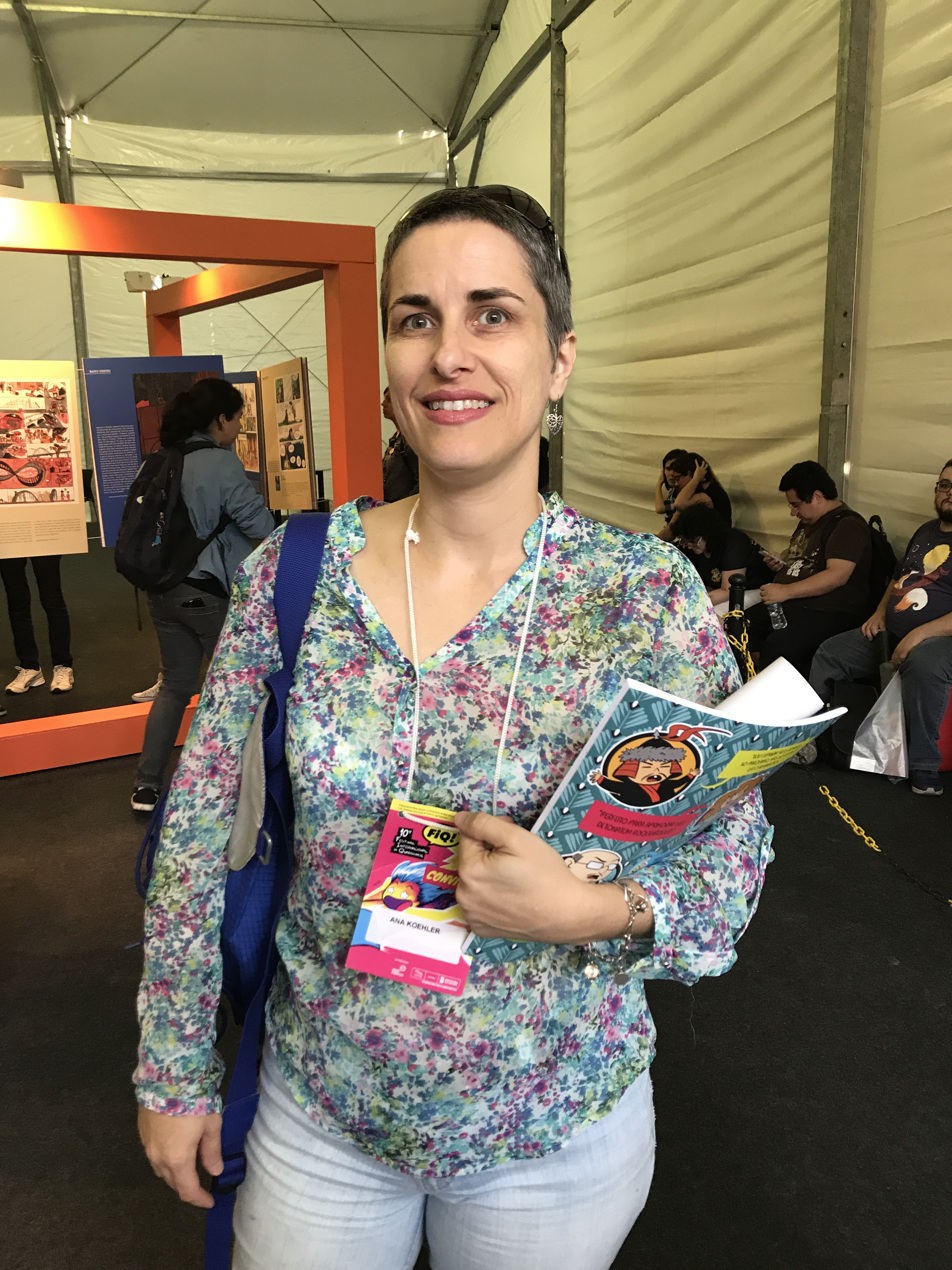
- Ana Luiza Koehler in 2018 Festival Internacional de Quadrinhos
- Born: 12 May 1977; Porto Alegre
- Occupation: Comics artist
- Notable work: Beco do Rosário
- Awards: Troféu HQ Mix for best independent publication (Beco do Rosário, 2016); Prêmio DB Artes for Best Online Comics (2004)
- Website: www.analuizakoehler.com

Ana Luiza Koehler (Porto Alegre, May 12, 1977), is a Brazilian comics artist and architect. She has a master's degree in architecture from the Federal University of Rio Grande do Sul and has worked with illustration since 1993, mainly with publishers of the Franco-Belgian comics market.

Her first work was for European publisher Éditions Daniel Maghen in 2009, being responsible for the art of the two volumes of the graphic novel Awrah, written by Fuat Erkol and Christian Simon. Koehler has also worked for publishers such as Soleil Productions, Fauvard and DC Comics, among others, as well as creating scientific illustrations of Archeology and History.

In 2015, Koehler became curator of Festival Internacional de Quadrinhos, the most traditional comics festival in Brazil. In the same year, she published in Brazil the independent graphic novel Beco do Rosário, which talks about the modernization of Porto Alegre in the 1920s and tells the fictional story of Vitória, a young girl who lives in the area of Beco do Rosário and who dreams to become a journalist. The drawings were made with dip pen and watercolor. The work was developed in parallel to Koehler's Master dissertation, whose theme was the urban changes of the region of Beco do Rosário.

In 2016, Koehler won the Troféu HQ Mix, the most important Brazilian comic book award, in the category "best independent author publication" by her graphic novel Beco do Rosario. An art exhibition about this book, held in Galeria Hipotética, in Porto Alegre, with original pages, photos from 1920s and character and scenery studies, also won the award in the same year in the category "best exhibition".

== Bibliography ==
- Awrah volume 1: La Rose des sables (written by Fuat Erkol and Christian Simon, Éditions Daniel Maghen, 2009, ISBN 978-2-356-74012-0)
- Awrah volume 2: Le Maudit (written by Fuat Erkol and Christian Simon, Éditions Daniel Maghen, 2010, ISBN 978-2-356-74020-5)
- Carthage volume 2: La flamme de Vénus (written by Gregory Lassablière and Fabrice David, Soleil Productions, 2011, ISBN 978-2-302-01815-0)
- MSP Novos 50 – Mauricio de Sousa por Novos 50 Artistas (many artists, Panini Brasil, 2011, soft cover ISBN 978-85-7351-815-3, hard cover ISBN 978-85-7351-814-6)
- La Centurie des Convertis (written by Bruno Césard, co-penciller Manual Morgado, Fauvard Éditeur, 2011, ISBN 978-2-9538133-2-6)
- Vertigo Quarterly CMYK volume 1: Cyan (many artists, DC Comics, 2014)
- Beco do Rosário (independent, 2015; Veneta, 2020)
- Une génération française volume 3: Ayez confiance! (written by Thierry Gloris, Soleil Productions, 2017, ISBN 978-2-302-06401-0)
- Une génération française volume 6: Radio-Paris ment (written by Thierry Gloris, Soleil Productions, 2018, ISBN 978-2-302-06993-0)
- Viaduto (Veneta, 2023)
