= Florian Köhler =

German politician (born 1994)

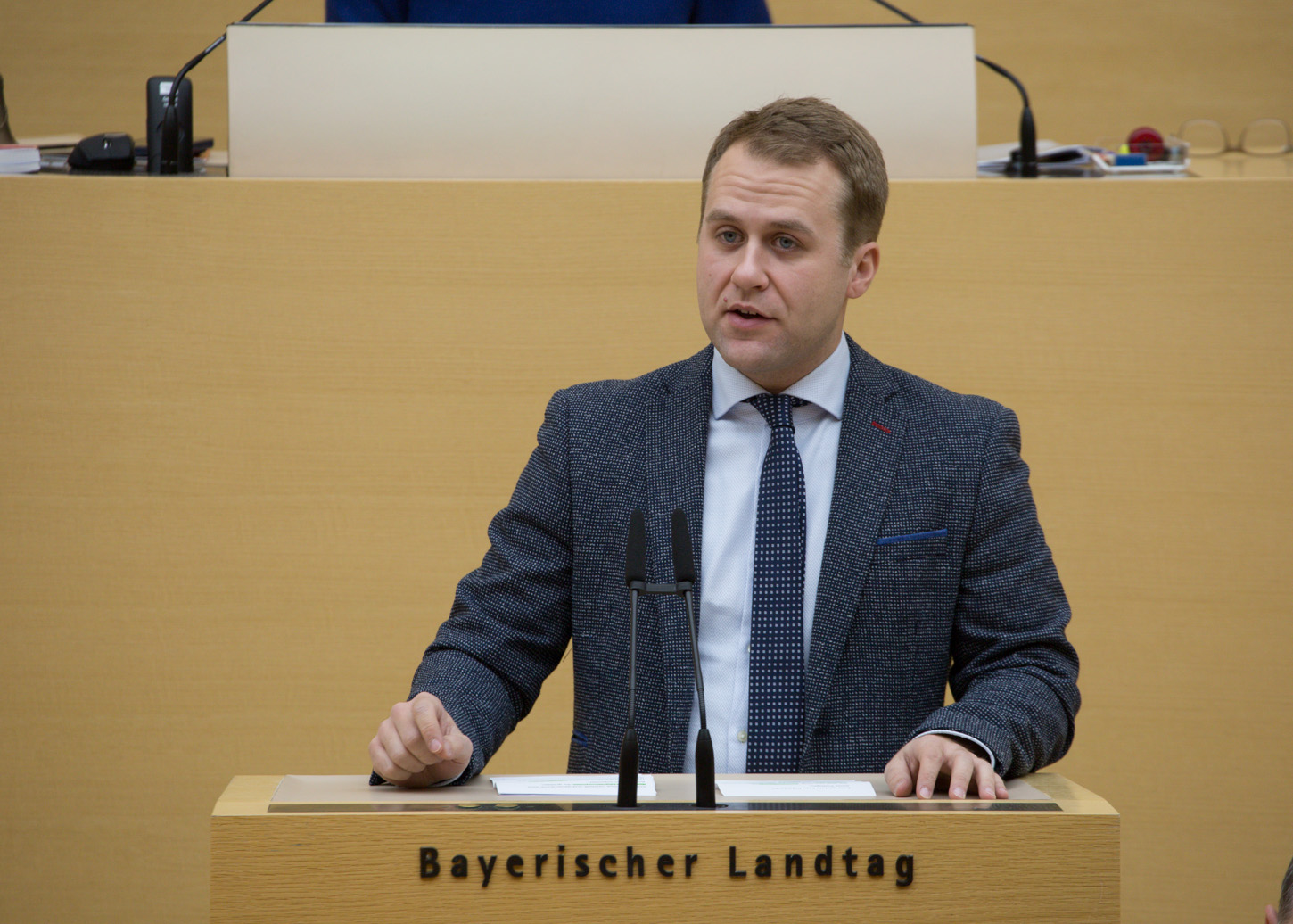
- Köhler in 2023

Member of the Landtag of Bavaria
- Incumbent
- Assumed office 30 October 2023

Personal details
- Born: 16 February 1994 (age 32) Bamberg
- Party: Alternative for Germany (since 2014)

Florian Köhler (born 16 February 1994 in Bamberg) is a German politician serving as a member of the Landtag of Bavaria since 2023. From 2015 to 2016, he served as chairman of the Young Alternative for Germany in Bavaria.
