= Klaus J. Kohler =

German phonetician

Klaus J. Kohler (German pronunciation: [ˈklaʊs ˈkoːlɐ]; born 1935 in Karlsruhe) is a German phonetician.

In 1964, he received a PhD from the University of Edinburgh for his thesis on “Aspects of the history of English pronunciation in Scotland”.

== Selected publications ==
- Kommunikative Aspekte satzphonetischer Prozesse im Deutschen. In: H. Vater (ed.), Phonologische Probleme des Deutschen. Studien zur deutschen Grammatik 10, 13-39. Tübingen: Gunter Narr (1979).
- Dimensions in the perception of fortis and lenis plosives. Phonetica 36, 332-343 (1979).
- F0 in the production of lenis and fortis plosives. Phonetica 39, 199-218 (1982).
- F0 in the perception of lenis and fortis plosives. JASA 78, 21-32 (1985).
- Invariance and variability in speech timing: from utterance to segment in German. In: J. S. Perkell, D. H. Klatt (eds), Invariance and Variability in Speech Processes, 268-289. Hillsdale, New Jersey: Lawrence Erlbaum (1986).
- Parameters of speech rate perception in German words and sentences: duration, F0 movement, and F0 level. Language and Speech 29, 115-139 (1986).
- Computer synthesis of intonation. Proc. 12th Intern. Congr. Acoustics, Toronto, A6-6 (1986).
- Categorical pitch perception. Proc. 11th ICPhS, Tallinn, vol. 5, 331-333 (1987).
- The linguistic functions of F0 peaks. Proc. 11th ICPhS, Tallinn, vol. 3, 149-152 (1987).
- An intonation model for a German Text-to-speech system. Proc. Speech '88, 7th FASE Symposium, Edinburgh., 1241-1249 (1988).
- Macro and micro F0 in the synthesis of intonation. In: J. Kingston and M. E. Beckman (eds), Papers in Laboratory Phonology I, 115-138. Cambridge: CUP (1990).
- Segmental reduction in connected speech in German: phonological facts and phonetic explanations. In: W. J. Hardcastle, A. Marchal (eds), Speech Production and Speech Modelling, 69-92. Dordrecht: Kluwer Academic Publishers (1990).
- Form and function of intonation peaks in German; a research project. In: K. J. Kohler, (ed.) Studies in German Intonation. AIPUK 25, 11-27. (1991).
- Terminal intonation patterns in single-accent utterances of German: phonetics, phonology and semantics. In: K. J. Kohler, (ed.) Studies in German Intonation. AIPUK 25, 115-185. (1991).
- A model of German intonation. In: K. J. Kohler, (ed.) Studies in German Intonation. AIPUK 25, 295-360. (1991).
- Glottal stops and glottalization in German. Data and theory of connected speech processes. Phonetica 51, 38-51 (1994).
- Einführung in die Phonetik des Deutschen. Berlin: Erich Schmidt Verlag (2. Aufl. 1995).
- Modelling prosody in spontaneous speech. In: Y. Sagisaka, N. Campbell, N. Higuchi (eds), Computing Prosody. Computational models for processing spontaneous speech. 187-210. New York: Springer (1997).
- Parametric control of prosodic variables by symbolic input in TTS synthesis. In: J. P. H. van Santen, R. W. Sproat, J. P. Olive, J. Hirschberg (eds), Progress in Speech Synthesis 459-475. New York: Springer (1997).
- Investigating unscripted speech: implications for phonetics and phonology. In: Festschrift for Björn Lindblom. Phonetica 57, 85-94 (2000).
- Überlänge im Niederdeutschen? In: R. Peters, H. P. Pütz, U. Weber (eds.), Vulpis Adolatio. Festschrift für Hubertus Menke zum 60. Geburtstag, 385-402. Heidelberg: C. Winter (2001).
- Articulatory dynamics of vowels and consonants in speech communication. Journal of the International Phonetic Association 31, 1-16 (2001).
- Plosive-related glottalization phenomena in read and spontaneous speech. A stød in German? In: N. Grønnum and J. Rischel (eds), To Honour Eli Fischer-Jørgensen. Travaux du Cercle Linguistique de Copenhague, vol. 31, 174-211. Copenhagen: Reitzel (2001). (Lautmuster deutscher Spontansprache 2.(a))
- (ed.) Progress in Experimental Phonology. From Communicative Function to Phonetic Substance and Vice Versa. Phonetica 62 (2005).
