= Ernst Köhler =

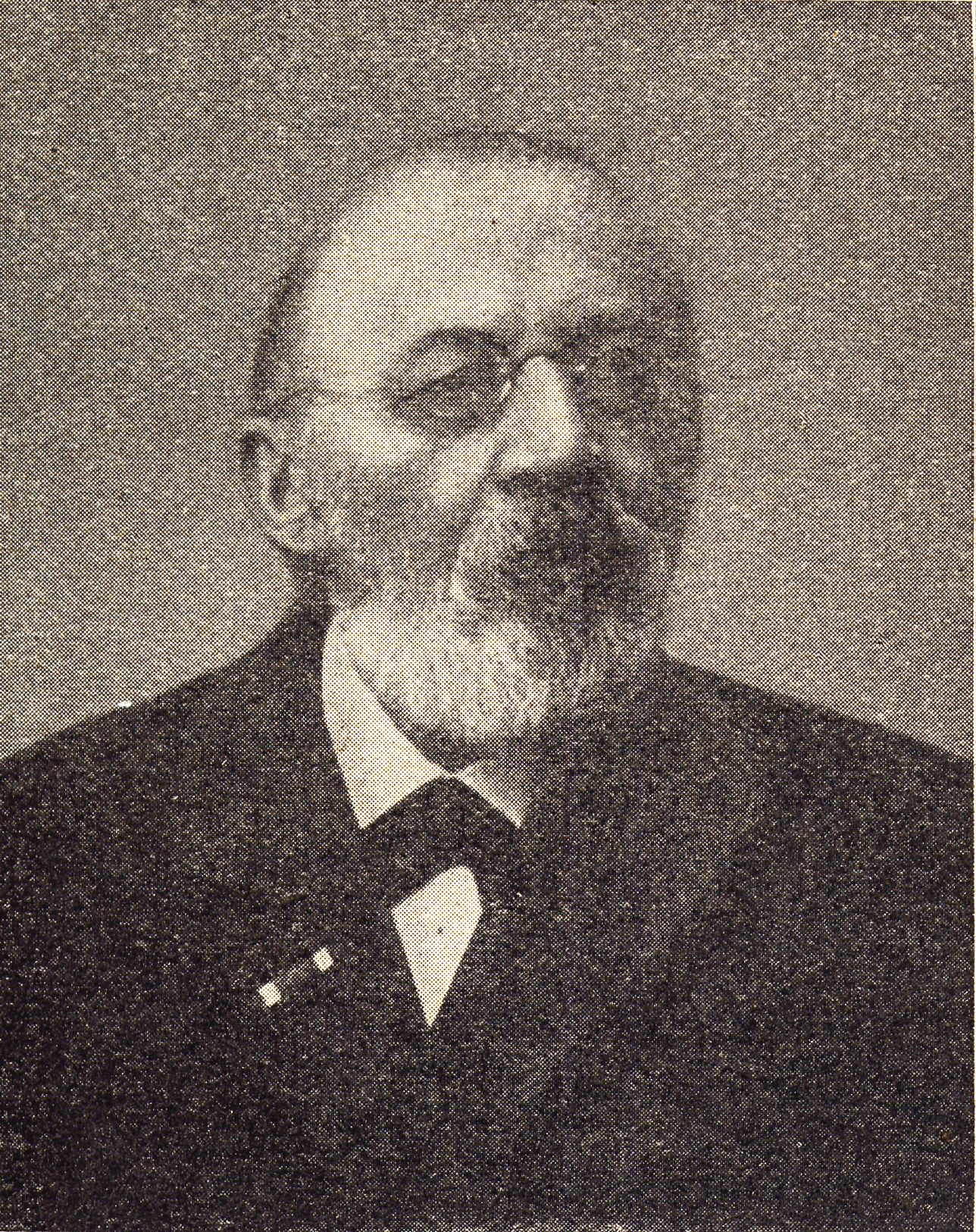

Johann August Ernst Köhler (5 August 1829 – 19 December 1903) was a German teacher, writer and naturalist. He conducted ethnological, folkloristic, and geological studies. He was a founding member of the Erzgebirgsverein.

Köhler was born in Bautzen, the son of a house servant and his mother was a Sorb. He attended local schools after which he trained at the teaching school. He had an interest in the natural sciences and taught botany, mineralogy, local history and mathematics as a private tutor in Bellwitz near Löbau (1852) and at a school in Großschönau and at Bautzen. He took an interest in the local folklore. In 1860 he received a doctorate from the University of Leipzig and in 1873 he became a senior teacher at the royal teaching seminary in Schneeberg. He was a founding member of the Erzgebirgsverein in 1878 and served as its chairperson until 1899. He retired in 1897 and lived with his daughters in Aue due to failing eyesight.

Köhler published a history of Upper Lusatia, wrote about local customs, legends, beliefs and sayings.
