= Alban Köhler =

German radiologist

Alban Köhler (1 March 1874 – 26 February 1947) was a German radiologist best known for his discovery of a rare foot disorder found in children that was named Köhler disease in his honor.

== Early life and education ==
Köhler was born on 1 March 1874 in Petsa, Thuringia. He studied medicine in Freiburg, Erlangen, and Berlin, graduating in 1899. He then went on to three years of surgical practice at St. Joseph's Hospital in Wiesbaden.

== Career in radiology ==
In 1902, Köhler established himself as a radiologist. He also is the namesake of the Köhler line in radiology, which stems from the superior pelvic aperture (medial border of the iliac crest) to the medial border of the ischium.

== Death ==
Köhler died on 26 February 1947 in Wiesbaden.
