= Clemens Flämig =

German music conductor

Clemens Flämig (born in 1976) is a German conductor and Stadtsingechores zu Halle. In 2016, in the course of a selection procedure, he was shortlisted alongside Markus Teutschbein for the 17th Thomanerchor after Johann Sebastian Bach.

== Life ==
Flämig was born in Dresden in 1976 and was a member of the Dresdner Kreuzchor. For his further musical education he received a Rudolf Mauersberger scholarship in 1995.

From 1996 to 2003 Flämig studied church music, choir conducting and singing at the music academies in Hochschule für Musik Freiburg, Hochschule für Musik und Darstellende Kunst Mannheim and Staatliche Hochschule für Musik Trossingen. Numerous master classes round off his musical education. In 2014 he took part in a further education master choir conducting course with Jörg-Peter Weigle in Berlin.

In addition to soloist tasks, Flämig sang in various professional vocal ensembles in Germany and Switzerland after his studies.

Flämig has worked as cantor and organist at the Georgskirche Denzlingen, the Auferstehungskirche Freiburg-Littenweiler and the Protestant district cantorate of Breisgau-Hochschwarzwald. He was also assistant in the Freiburger Bachchor for several years. From May 2011 to October 2014 Flämig was vice-conductor of the Knabenkantorei Basel. In 2013 he also took over several rehearsals with the Camerata Vocale Freiburg. Since 2014 he has regularly supervised performances of the J.S. Bach Foundation St. Gallen as choral assistant.

Since November 2014 Flämig has been the conductor of the Stadtsingechor zu Halle.

Flämig was nominated for the position of cantor of the Thomanerchor Leipzig in summer 2015. After rehearsing and performing sacred works for the motets and a Bach cantata with the boys' choir in rehearsal weeks, he was even a finalist in 2016 alongside Markus Teutschbein. Gotthold Schwarz, who had already conducted the St. Thomas Boys Choir on several occasions and had not applied for the Thomaskantorat, was, however, proposed to the Leipzig City Council on 23 May 2016 as the 17th Thomaskantor after Bach by the selection committee after the end of the selection process and was appointed to the post on 20 August 2016.
