= Kulturinsel Halle =

Cultural complex in Halle (Saale)

Coordinates: 51°29′8.05941″N 11°58′7.44764″E

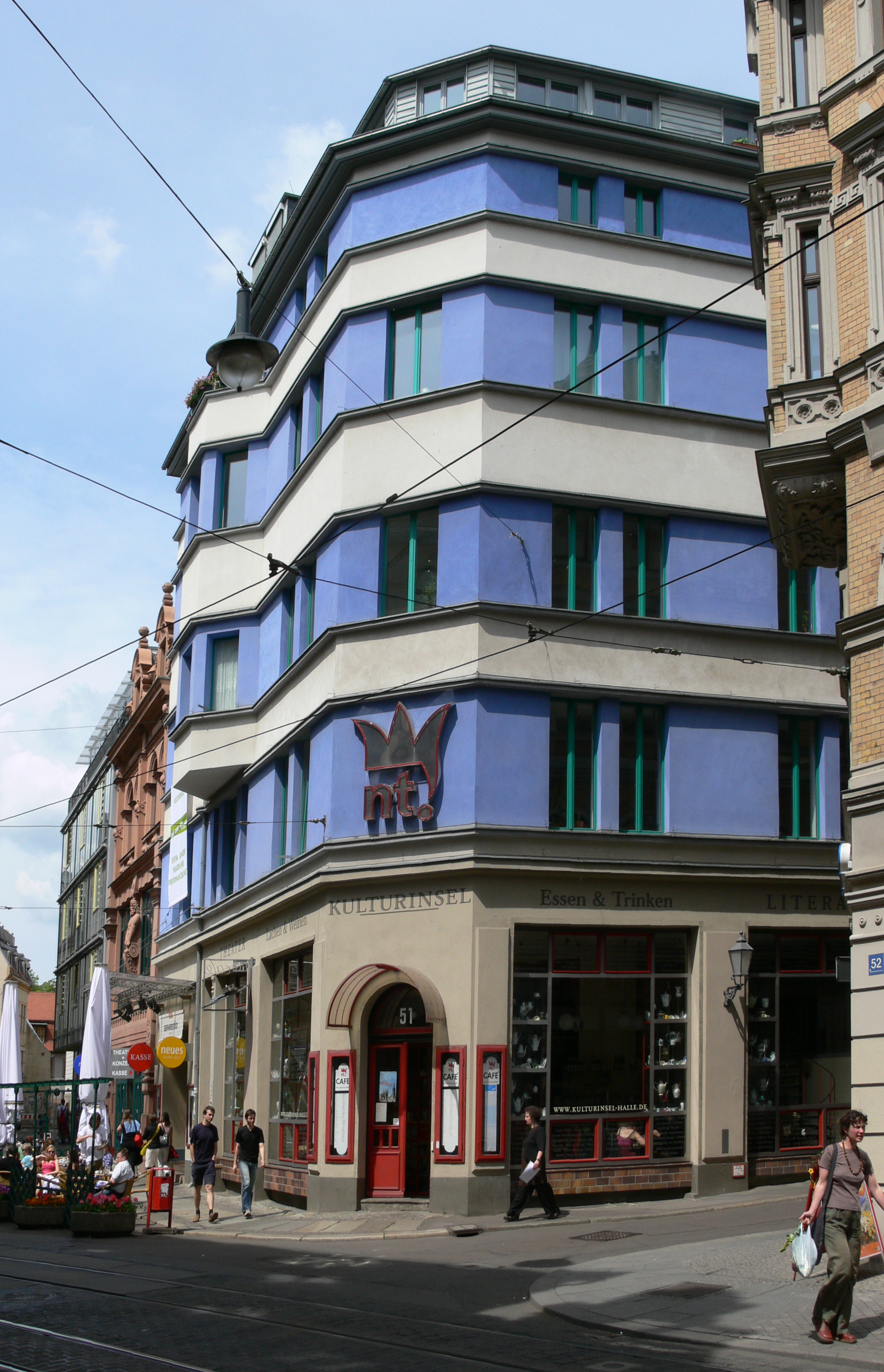
The Neue Theater Halle as part of the Kulturinsel

The Kulturinsel Halle is a building and cultural complex in Halle (Saale). In addition to the Neues Theater Halle, it houses the Puppentheater Halle, the studio, the "Schaufenster" and a library. Furthermore, it includes the gastronomic establishments Café nt and Strieses Biertunnel.

== History ==
The Kulturinsel Halle was built between 1980 and 2002, starting from the old Kino der Deutsch-Sowjetischen Freundschaft (Cinema of German-Soviet Friendship), a whole block of eight buildings was converted and expanded into a cultural venue. It was shaped by the long-time artistic director Peter Sodann, who found a venue here in the cinema for his ensemble at the time. In 1999, Peter Sodann received the prize of the Association of German Critics for the project "Kulturinsel".

There was already a Neues Theater in Halle before that, founded in 1870. After a fire in 1902, it was run by Eugen Moritz Mauthner until 1912, after which it was a warehouse.

== Current situation ==
Since the closure of the Thalia Theatre in 2012, its continuing ensemble is also based on the Kulturinsel. The artistic directors within the Theater, Oper und Orchester GmbH Halle are Matthias Brenner (schauspiel halle and Thalia Theater) and Christoph Werner (Puppet Theatre Halle).
