= Lyle Koehler =

American historian and author

- Born: March 6, 1944; Sparta, Wisconsin, US
- Died: July 30, 2015 (aged 71)
- Spouse: Kathy Hofmeister
- Awards: 1981 Pulitzer Prize for History finalist

Academic background
- Education: BA, 1966, University of Wisconsin–La Crosse; MA, 1968, University of Cincinnati

Academic work
- Institutions: University of Cincinnati; New Mexico State University
- Notable works: A Search for Power: The 'Weaker Sex' in Seventeenth Century New England

Lyle P. Koehler (March 6, 1944 – July 30, 2015) was an American historian and author.

== Early life and education ==
Koehler was born in Sparta, Wisconsin on March 6, 1944, to parents Irene and Lyle Koehler Sr. He attended Black River Falls High School for two years and finished at Sparta High School before enrolling at the University of Wisconsin–La Crosse. Koehler earned his Bachelor of Arts degree in 1966 and his Master's degree in 1968 from the University of Cincinnati. He worked towards a PhD in philosophy for three years before saying "I began generating history and never got the PhD."

== Career ==
Upon completing his master's degree, Koehler began working as the director of tutorial and referral services at the University of Cincinnati. During the summer of 1973, Koehler began his research in various New England courthouses reading arrest records of 17th-century Colonial women. His work accumulated into his first book, A Search for Power: The 'Weaker Sex' in Seventeenth Century New England, which was a finalist for the 1981 Pulitzer Prize for History. Following this, Koehler left Cincinnati and became an editor and technical writer at New Mexico State University. While there, he wrote his second work, Black Peoples: A Chronology and Bibliography, 1787-1982, for the 1988 Cincinnati Arts Consortium. It "provided valuable details, dates and names for this series on black leaders."

Koehler died on July 30, 2015, at Lakeview Health Center in West Salem.
