= Ingomar Grünauer =

Austrian classical composer

Ingomar Grünauer (born 11 August 1938 in Melk) is a contemporary Austrian composer. The focus of his work is on pieces in smaller forms for music theatre. His opera Cantor - Die Vermessung des Unendlichen, which deals with the existential conflicts in the life of the revolutionary mathematician Georg Cantor (1845-1918), was premiered on 10 November 2006 at the Halle Opera House under the direction of Roger Epple.

== Main works ==
- Chamber opera Lipmanns Leib (Wiesbaden 1961)
- Chamber opera Die Schöpfungsgeschichte des Adolf Wölfli (Basel 1981)
- Opera Amleth und Fengo (Heidelberg 1982)
- musikalisches Kammerspiel Die Mutter (after Maxim Gorki, Basel 1988)
- Chamber operetta in 17 sensitive pictures Die Rache einer russischen Waise (after Henri Rousseau, Saarbrücken 1993)
- Opera in 11 scenes Winterreise (text Fr. Micieli, Lucerne 1994).

== Education and career ==
- 1950–1961: Studies at the Universität für Musik und darstellende Kunst Wien: Conducting (Hans Swarowsky), piano (Richard Hauser) and composition (Karl Schiske)
- 1959: artistic Maturity Examination in Conducting and music composition
- 1957, 1959 and 1961: Participation in the Darmstädter Ferienkurse.
- 1961–1968: Kapellmeister and Korrepetitor at the Theater & Orchester Heidelberg.
- 1968–1982: Teacher in primary, secondary and comprehensive schools in Schwandorf (Upper Palatinate) and in Wiesbaden.
- 1974: Assistant lecturer in scenic music at the University of Salvador da Bahia.
- Since 1982: Professor for aesthetics and communication (Schwerpunkt Theaterarbeit und kulturelle Animation) an der Fachhochschule Frankfurt.

== Prizes and awards ==
- 1960: First Prize at the International Composition Competition of the University of Music and Performing Arts Vienna
- 1966: Cultural Week Prize of the City of Innsbruck
- 1969: Promotion Prize of the Province of Lower Austria
- 1982: Culture Prize of the City of Wiesbaden

== Composition commissions ==
- Musiktheater Gelsenkirchen
- Städtische Bühne Heidelberg
- Staatstheater Stuttgart
- Staatstheater Wiesbaden
- Kultusministerium Baden-Württemberg
- Stadttheater Luzern
- Theater Basel
- ORF
- Staatstheater Saarbrücken
- Bundesministerium für Bildung, Wissenschaft und Kultur des Staates Österreich

== Work ==
- Besichtigung, Versteigerung und Beseitigung von 5 Künstlern for soprano, stummen Schauspieler und Instrumente (1971) 20’
- Auktion, Besichtigung, Versteigerung und Beseitigung von 5 Künstlern Concertante version of the stage work of the same name for soprano, silent actor and instruments (1975) 20’
- Peer Gynt ballet music after Henrik Ibsen and Edvard Grieg, libretto by Robert Trinchero (1978) 95’
- Die Schöpfungsgeschichte des Adolf Wölfli Music theatre for six singers, string quintet and percussion, libretto by Ingomar Grünauer (1981–82) 80’
- Amleth und Fengo Opera in two acts, libretto after Historia Danica of the Saxo Grammaticus by Ingomar Grünauer (1882) 75’
- Sinfonietta for mezzo-soprano, tenor, solo clarinette and orchestra, text by Franz Kafka (1986) 19’
- Die Mutter Musical chamber play based on the novel of the same name by Maxim Gorky for eleven singers, violin and percussion (1988) 80’
- König für einen Tag Opera in three acts after Calderón, text by Ingomar Grünauer after Calderón and Hugo von Hofmannsthal (1990) 85’
- Die Rache einer russischen Waise Chamber operetta in 17 sensitive pictures after the play of the same name by Henri Rousseau, arrangement of the text by Matthias Kaiser and Ingomar Grünauer (1993) 80’
- Winterreise Opera in 11 scenes, text by Francesco Micieli (1994/96) 85’.
- Trilogy der Sommerfrische Opera in three acts by Carlo Goldoni, libretto by Francesco Micieli (1998) 90’
- Palermo-Musik for accordion and Orchestra (2001) 20’
- Cantor – Die Vermessung des Unendlichen one-act opera (2004) 90’.
