= Solomon Northup =

Free-born African American kidnapped by slave-traders

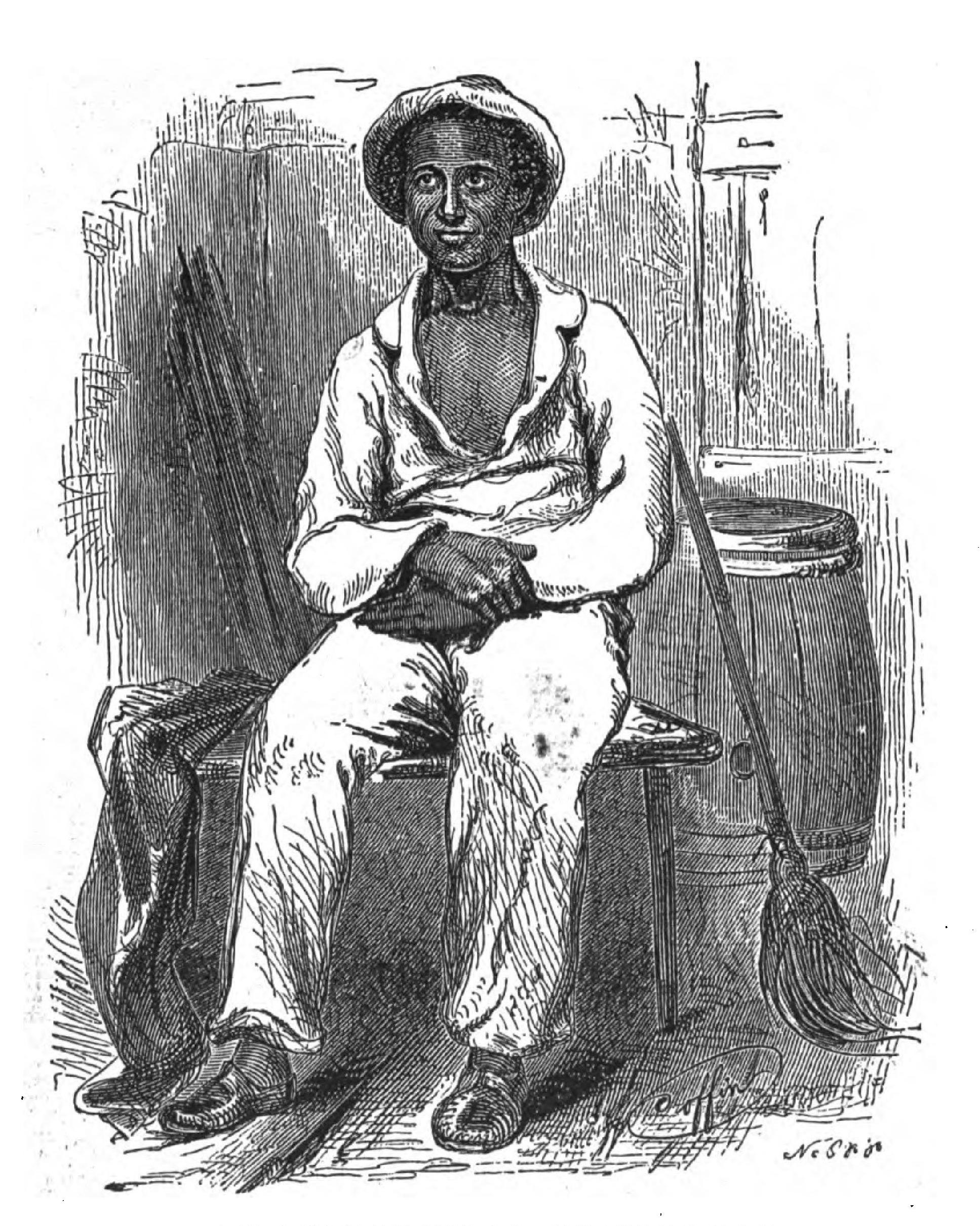
- Engraving from his autobiography
- Born: Solomon Northup (Note: In early newspaper articles, the name is spelled both "Northrop" and "Northrup", sometimes both spellings occur in the same article.); July 10, c. 1807–1808; Minerva, New York, U.S.
- Died: Unknown; after 1857
- Occupations: Author; abolitionist; raftsman; fiddler; laborer; carpenter
- Known for: Writing Twelve Years a Slave

Solomon Northup (July 10, c. 1807/1808 — unknown; after 1857) was an American abolitionist and the primary author of the memoir Twelve Years a Slave. A free-born American of mixed race from New York, he was the son of a freed slave and a free woman of color. Northup was a professional violinist, farmer, and landowner in Washington County, New York. In 1841, he was offered a traveling musician's job and went to Washington, D.C. (where slavery was legal); there, he was drugged and kidnapped into slavery. He was shipped to New Orleans on April 24, 1841 by James H. Birch aboard the Brig Orleans from Richmond, VA. Northup was purchased by a planter and held as a slave for nearly twelve years in the Red River region of Louisiana; mostly in Avoyelles Parish. He remained enslaved until he met Samuel Bass, a Canadian working on his plantation who helped get word to New York, where state law provided aid to free New York citizens who had been kidnapped and sold into slavery. His family and friends enlisted the aid of the governor of New York, Washington Hunt, and Northup regained his freedom on January 3, 1853.

The slave trader in Washington, D.C., James H. Birch, was arrested and tried, but acquitted because District of Columbia law at the time prohibited Northup as a black man from testifying against white people. Later, in New York State, his northern kidnappers were located and charged, but the case was tied up in court for two years because of jurisdictional challenges and finally dropped when Washington, D.C. was found to have jurisdiction. The D.C. government did not pursue the case. Those who had kidnapped and enslaved Northup received no punishment.

In his first year of freedom, Northup wrote and published a memoir, Twelve Years a Slave (1853). He lectured on behalf of the abolitionist movement, giving more than two dozen speeches throughout the Northeast about his experiences, to build momentum against slavery. He largely disappeared from the historical record after 1857, although a letter later reported him alive in early 1863. Some commentators thought he had been kidnapped again, but historians believe it unlikely, as he would have been considered too old to bring a good price. The details of his death have never been documented.

Northup's memoir was adapted and produced as the 1984 television film Solomon Northup's Odyssey and the 2013 feature film 12 Years a Slave. The latter won three Academy Awards, including Best Picture, at the 86th Academy Awards.

== Early life ==
Solomon Northup was born in the town of Minerva in Essex County, New York, on July 10, 1807 or July 10, 1808. (Note: Although Northup gives his year of birth as 1808 in his book, in sworn testimony in 1854, he said he had reached the age of 47 on July 10 that year, making his year of birth 1807, which is consistent with a statement by his wife in 1852 that he was "about 45".) His mother was a free woman of color, which meant that her sons, Solomon and his older brother Joseph, were born free according to the principle of partus sequitur ventrem. (Note: His brother settled in Oswego and was still living there in 1853.) Solomon described his mother as a quadroon, meaning that she was one-quarter African, and three-quarters European.

His father, Mintus, was a freedman who had been enslaved in his early life by the Northup family. Born in Rhode Island, he was taken with the Northups when they moved to Hoosick, New York, in Rensselaer County. His master, Henry Northrop, manumitted Mintus in his will, after which Mintus adopted the surname Northup. His surname was sometimes spelled Northrup in records. Upon attaining his freedom, Mintus married and moved to Minerva with his wife.

Northup said his father was "a man respected for his industry and integrity". A farmer, Mintus was successful enough to own land and thus meet the state's property requirements for the right to vote. (Note: From 1821 on, when it revised its constitution, the state retained the property requirement for black people, but dropped it for white men, thus expanding their franchise. It is notable that Mintus Northup saved enough money as a freedman to buy land that satisfied this requirement, and registered to vote.) His sons received what was considered to be a good education for free black people at that time. Northup and his brother worked on the family farm as boys. He spent his leisure time playing the violin and reading books.

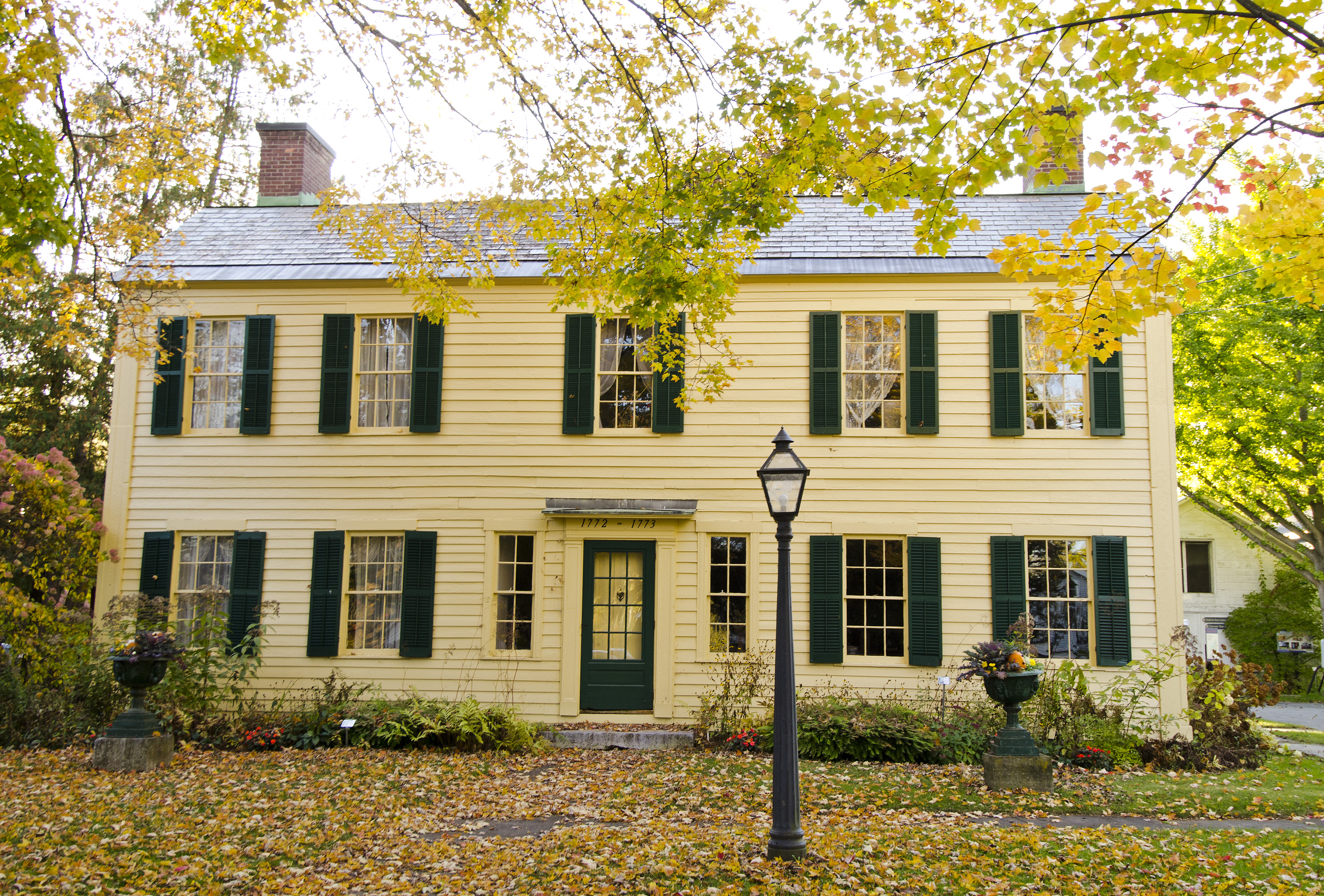
Old Fort House is a historic house located in the town of Fort Edward, New York. The house, the oldest house in Washington County, New York, is operated as a local history museum. Solomon Northup lived in Fort Edward as a child, he was married there, and he started his family in the town.

Mintus moved his family to Washington County, New York, and worked on several farms owned by the Northups. From Minerva, they moved to the farm of Clark Northup near Slyborough (Slyboro) in Granville, Washington County, for several years. (Note: Clarke Northup's house still stands in the Slyborough (Slyboro) section of Granville on the north side of County Route 23. Nearby, Mintus lived on the south side of Aldous Road near a small pond. The house no longer exists.) The family of four then lived at Alden Farm, a short distance north of Sandy Hill (now called Hudson Falls). They later moved to an area east of Fort Edward on the road from Fort Edward to Argyle, where Mintus lived until his death. Mintus died at Fort Edward on November 22, 1829, and was interred at the Hudson Falls Baker Cemetery. His mother died during Northup's enslavement (1841 to 1852). According to her daughter-in-law Anne and Nicholas C. Northup, she died around 1846 or 1847 in Oswego County, New York. (Note: Five or six years before 1852.)

== Marriage and family ==
Solomon Northup married Anne Hampton on December 25, 1829, one month after the death of his father, or on November 22, 1829, according to sworn depositions by Anne Northup, Josiah Hand, and Timothy Eddy, the last of whom was the justice of the peace who performed the wedding. They were married in Fort Edward. Anne, the daughter of William Hampton, was born March 14, 1808. (Note: Buell states that she was born in or shortly after 1800.) She grew up in Sandy Hill. A "woman of color", she was of African, European, and Native American descent. They had three children: Elizabeth (born c. 1831), Margaret (born c. 1833), and Alonzo (born c. 1835).

At the start of their marriage, the couple lived at Fort House, "the old yellow house", at the southern end of Fort Edward. In 1830, they moved to Kingsbury, both of which were small communities in Washington County. After selling their farm in 1834, the Northups moved 20 miles (32 km) to Saratoga Springs, New York, for its employment opportunities.

Anne was known for her culinary expertise. She worked for local taverns that served food and drink, at the United States Hotel and elite hotels such as the Pavilion Hotel. When court was in session at the county seat of Fort Edward, she worked at Sherrill's Coffee House in Sandy Hill.

After Northup was kidnapped, Anne and her oldest daughter, Elizabeth, went to work as domestic servants in New York City at Madame Jumel's Mansion on the East River in the summer of 1841. Alonzo was with them. Margaret, their youngest daughter, went to Hoboken, New Jersey, to live with a friend of Madame Jumel, who also had a young daughter. After about two years, Anne brought the family back together in Saratoga, where she worked as a hotel cook, including at Carpenter's Hotel in Glens Falls.

In 1852, she learned of her husband's fate and asked for the help of Henry B. Northup, the son of Solomon's father's former master, to free him. A letter was prepared to the Governor of New York, Washington Hunt, based upon a deposition given by Anne Northup to Justice of the Peace Charles Hughes on November 19, 1852. He gathered the information to prove that Northup was free and went to Louisiana to bring him back to New York.

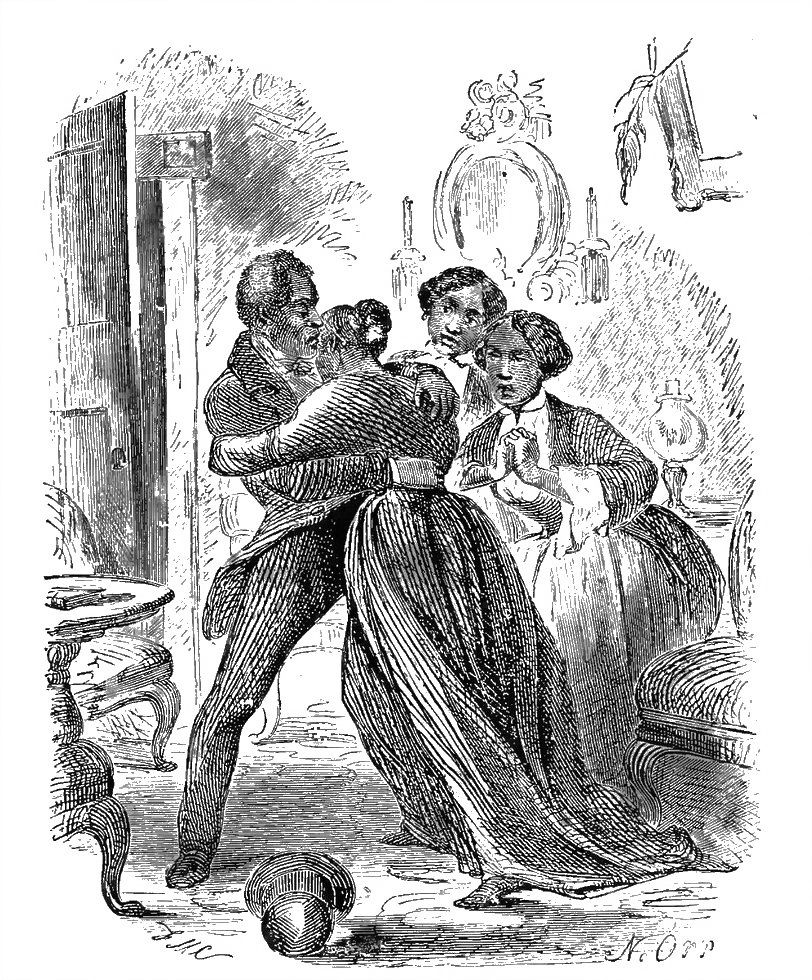
Solomon Northup returning home to his family, Twelve Years a Slave (1853), engraved by Nathaniel Orr, published by Frederick M. Coffin

Northup returned to Sandy Hill on January 21, 1853, and reunited with his wife and children. By 1855, he was living with his daughter Margaret Stanton and her family in Queensbury, Warren County, New York. He purchased land in Glens Falls near his daughter. In his memoir, Northup described his love for his wife as "sincere and unabated" since the time of their marriage, and his children as "beloved".

While Northup gave talks about his book around the country, Anne worked in Bolton Landing on Lake George at the Mohican House hotel. Author David Fiske states that Northup seems to have had a difficult time overcoming the years in which he was enslaved. He was said to have drunk a lot and did not seem to spend a lot of time with his wife. By the late 1850s, it was unknown what had become of Northup, and he was not listed with his family in the 1860 census.

After selling their land in Glens Falls, Anne Northup moved to the household of her daughter and son-in-law, Margaret and Philip Stanton, in Moreau, Saratoga County, where she again was recorded as married. However, Solomon was not with the family. Anne did laundry, cooking and chores for a Moreau man. In 1870, she worked as a cook in the household of Burton C. Dennis, who kept the Middleworth House hotel in Sandy Hill. (Note: In 1870, Solomon Northup did not live 1) at the Middleworth House hotel in Sandy Hill, 2) with his daughter, Margaret Stanton, and his son-in-law in Moreau, New York, or 3) with his son, Alonzo in Fort Edward, New York.) Anne Northup lived in Kingsbury in Washington County, New York, in 1875. By that time, she was identified as a widow. She died in 1876 while performing her chores in Moreau. One obituary, while praising Anne, says of Solomon Northup that "after exhibiting himself through the country [he] became a worthless vagabond".

== Life ==
=== Canal worker, farmer, and violin player ===
In the winter of the year that he married, Northup worked as a laborer repairing the Champlain Canal. He then bought two horses and contracted to tow lumber on rafts to Troy from Lake Champlain beginning the following spring. He employed two workers. He worked on other waterways in upstate New York and he traveled to northern New York and Montreal, Canada. When the canal was closed down, he cut lumber during the winter of 1831–1832. He worked as a farm laborer in the Sandy Hill area.

He arranged to farm corn and oats on part of the Alden farm where his father lived in Kingsbury. He built a fine reputation as a fiddler and was in high demand to play for dances in surrounding villages. The couple had become prosperous due to the income Anne received as a cook and that Northup made farming and playing the violin.

The couple moved to Saratoga Springs in March 1834, where he drove a horse-drawn taxi for a businessman. During the tourist season, he worked for the United States Hotel, where he was employed by Judge James M. Marvin, a part-owner of the hotel. He played his violin at several well-known hotels in Saratoga Springs. He also worked on the construction of the Troy and Saratoga Railroad. He had become a regular customer and friend of William Perry and Cephus Parker, who owned several shops in town. Over the seven years that the Northups lived in Saratoga Springs, they had made ends meet and dressed their children in fine clothes, but they had been unable to prosper as hoped.

In March 1841, Anne went 20 miles to Sandy Hill, where she ran the kitchen at Sherrill's Coffee House during the court session. She may have taken their oldest daughter, Elizabeth, with her. Their two youngest children went to stay with their aunt. Northup stayed in Saratoga Springs to look for employment until the tourist season.

=== Kidnapped and sold into slavery ===
In 1841, at age 32, Northup met two men who introduced themselves as Merrill Brown and Abram Hamilton. Saying they were entertainers, members of a circus company, they offered him a job as a fiddler for several performances in New York City. Expecting the trip to be brief, Northup did not notify Anne, who was working in Sandy Hill. When they reached New York City, the men persuaded Northup to continue with them for a gig with their circus in Washington, D.C., offering him a generous wage and the cost of his return trip home. They stopped so that he could get a copy of his "free papers", which documented his status as a free man.

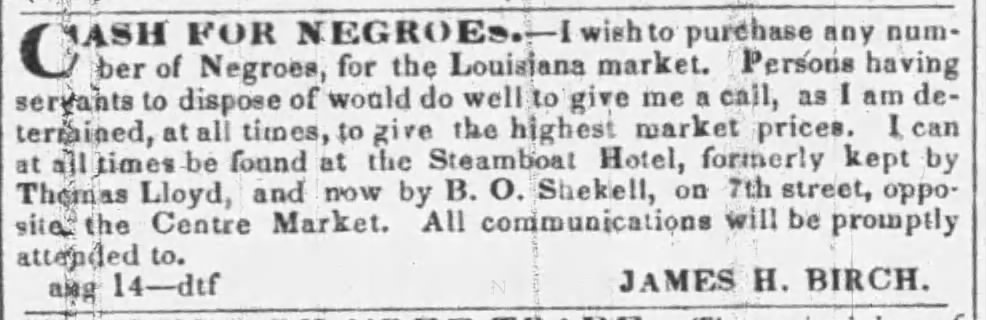
Slave trader James H. Birch offers "cash for negroes" to resell to the Louisiana market (Daily National Intelligencer, Washington, D. C., December 19, 1840)

The city had one of the nation's largest slave markets, and slave catchers were not above kidnapping free black people. At this time, 20 years before the Civil War, the expansion of cotton cultivation in the Deep South had led to a continuing high demand for healthy slaves. Kidnappers used a variety of means, from forced abduction to deceit, and frequently abducted children, who were easier to control.

It is possible that "Brown" and "Hamilton" incapacitated Northup. His symptoms suggest that he was drugged with belladonna or laudanum, or with a mixture of both. After which he was taken to Gadsby's Hotel and later sold to Washington slave trader James H. Birch (Note: Birch is spelled as Burch in Northup's book) for $650, who lied that he was a fugitive slave. However, Northup stated in his account of the ordeal in Twelve Years a Slave in Chapter II, "[w]hether they were accessory to my misfortunes – subtle and inhuman monsters in the shape of men – designedly luring me away from home and family, and liberty, for the sake of gold – those who read these pages will have the same means of determining as myself." Northup told Birch that he was a free man from the state of New York, but Birch and Ebenezer Radburn, his jailer, severely and cruelly tortured and beat up Northup to prevent him from saying he was a free man. Birch then lied and falsely presented Northup as an enslaved man from the state of Georgia. Northup was held in the Yellow House, the slave pen of trader William Williams, close to the United States Capitol. Birch shipped Northup and other slaves by sea to New Orleans, in what was called the coastwise slave trade, where Birch's partner Theophilus Freeman would sell them. During the voyage, Northup and the other slaves caught smallpox.

Northup persuaded John Manning, an English sailor, to send to Henry B. Northup, upon reaching New Orleans, a letter that told of his kidnapping and illegal enslavement. (Note: While on the brig Orleans he met John Manning, an English sailor who took an interest in him and agreed to get him a sheet of paper, ink, and a pen. At night, while Manning was on watch, he hid in a place where he could secretly write a note to Henry B. Northup. Manning posted the letter.) Henry was a lawyer, a relative of Henry Northrop who had held and freed Solomon's father, and a childhood friend of Solomon's. The letter was delivered to Governor Seward by Henry, but it was not actionable because Northup's location was unknown.

The New York State Legislature had passed a law in 1840 that made it illegal to entice or kidnap an African-American out of North and sell them into slavery. It provided legal and financial assistance to aid the recovery of any who were kidnapped, taken out of state, and illegally enslaved.

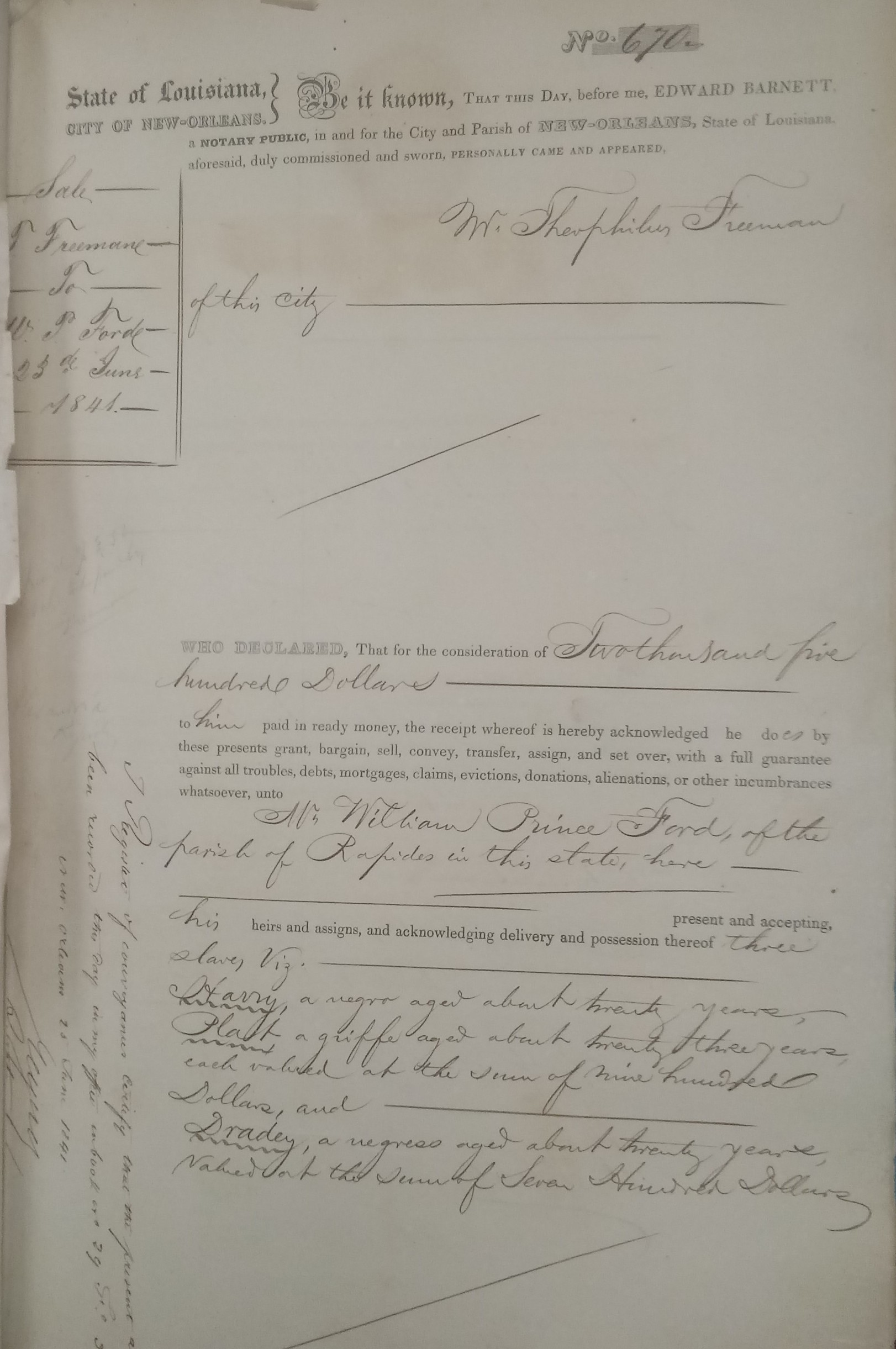
Record of sale from Theophilus Freeman to William Prince Ford of enslaved Harry, Platt (Solomon Northup) and Dradey (Eliza), June 23, 1841.

At the New Orleans slave market, Birch's partner Theophilus Freeman sold Northup (who had been renamed Platt) along with two other individuals, Harry and Eliza (renamed Dradey) to William Prince Ford, a preacher who engaged in small farming on Bayou Boeuf of the Red River in northern Louisiana. Ford was then a Baptist preacher. (In 1843, he led his congregation in converting to the closely related Churches of Christ after they were influenced by the writings of Alexander Campbell.) In his memoir, Northup characterized Ford as a good man who was considerate of the people he enslaved. Despite his situation, Northup wrote:

In my opinion, there never was a more kind, noble, candid, Christian man than William Ford. The influences and associations that had always surrounded him, blinded him to the inherent wrong at the bottom of the system of Slavery.

At Ford's place in Pine Woods, Northup assessed the problem of getting timber off Ford's farm to market. He proposed and then made a log raft to move lumber down the narrow Indian Creek, in order to transport the logs more easily. Northup built weaving looms so that fabric could be woven for clothing.

Ford came into financial difficulties and had to sell 18 enslaved people to settle his debts. In the winter of 1842, Ford sold Northup to John M. Tibaut, (Note: The name is spelled as "Tibeats" in Northup's book, which is likely the way it was pronounced locally.) a carpenter who had been working for Ford on the mills. Tibaut also had helped construct a weaving house and corn mill on Ford's Bayou Boeuf plantation. Ford owed Tibaut money for the work. Since Ford owed Tibaut less than the purchase price agreed upon for Northup, Ford held a chattel mortgage on Northup for $400, the difference between the two amounts.

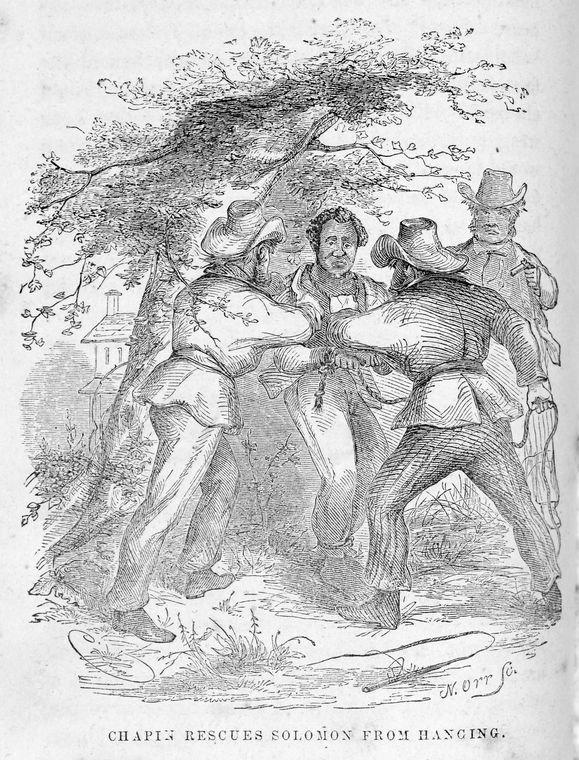
"Chapin rescues Solomon from hanging", illustration from Twelve Years A Slave (1853)

Under Tibaut, Northup suffered cruel and capricious treatment. Tibaut used him to help complete construction at Ford's plantation. At one point, Tibaut whipped Northup because he did not like the nails Northup was using. But Northup fought back, beating Tibaut severely. Enraged, Tibaut recruited two friends to lynch and hang Northup. Ford's overseer Chapin interrupted and prevented the men from killing Northup, reminding Tibaut of his debt to Ford, and chasing them off at gunpoint. Northup was left bound and noosed for hours until Ford returned home to cut him down. Northup believed that Tibaut's debt to Ford saved his life. Historian Walter Johnson suggests that Northup may well have been the first person Tibaut ever enslaved, marking his transition from itinerant employee to property-owning enslaver.

Tibaut hired Northup out to a planter named Eldret, who lived about 38 miles south on the Red River. At what he called "The Big Cane Brake", Eldret had Northup and other enslaved people clear cane, trees, and undergrowth in the bottomlands in order to develop cotton fields for cultivation. With the work unfinished, after about five weeks, Tibaut sold Northup to Edwin Epps.

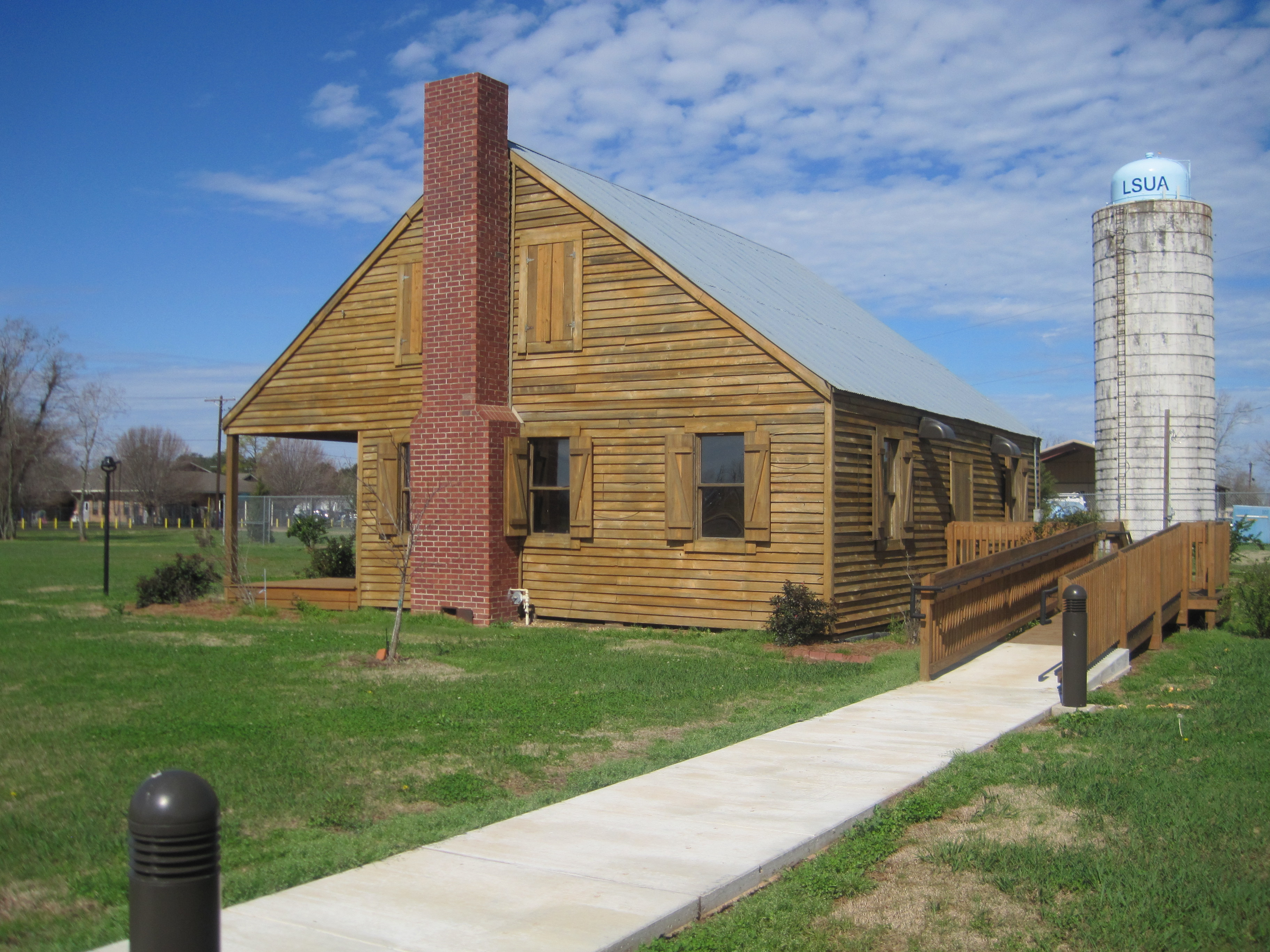
Restored Edwin Epps House, a plantation house. Now located on the Louisiana State University of Alexandria campus

Epps held Northup for almost 10 years, until 1853, in Avoyelles Parish. He was a cruel enslaver who frequently and indiscriminately punished enslaved people and drove them hard. His policy was to whip slaves if they did not meet daily work quotas he set for pounds of cotton to be picked, among other goals.

In 1852, itinerant Canadian carpenter Samuel Bass came to do some work for Epps. Hearing Bass express abolitionist views, Northup eventually decided to confide his secret to him. Bass was the first person he told of his true name and origins as a free man since he was first kidnapped and enslaved. Along with mailing a letter written by Northup, Bass wrote several letters at his request to Northup's friends, providing general details of his location at Bayou Boeuf, in hopes of gaining his rescue.

Bass did this at great personal risk, as the local people would not take kindly to a person helping an enslaved person to the detriment of an enslaver. In addition, Bass's help came after the passage of the Fugitive Slave Act of 1850, which increased federal penalties against people assisting enslaved people to escape.

=== Restoration of freedom ===
Bass wrote several letters to people Northup knew in Saratoga Springs: one went to his former employer Judge James M. Marvin and another reached Cephas Parker and William Perry, storekeepers in Saratoga. Parker and Perry forwarded the letter to Northup's wife, Anne, who contacted attorney Henry B. Northup. Henry B. Northup contacted New York Governor Washington Hunt, who took up the case, appointing the attorney general as his legal agent. In 1840, the New York State Legislature had passed a law committing the state to help any African American residents kidnapped into slavery, as well as guaranteeing a jury trial to alleged fugitive slaves. Once Northup's family was notified, his rescuers still had to do detective work to find the enslaved man, as he had partially tried to hide his location for protection in case the letters fell into the wrong hands, and Bass had not used his real name. They had to find documentation of his free status as a citizen and New York resident; Henry B. Northup also collected sworn affidavits from people who knew Solomon Northup. Northup did not know if Bass had reached anyone with the letters during this time. There was no means of communicating because of the secrecy they needed to maintain and the necessity of preventing Northup's owner from knowing their plans. Bass did not reveal his own name in the letter. (Note: Unbeknownst to his friends in Louisiana, Bass had left a wife and children in Canada. He also lived with a free woman of color in Louisiana.)

Henry gathered documentation and depositions and stopped off in Washington, D.C. to meet with Pierre Soule, a legislator from Louisiana, and the Secretary of War in preparation for his rescue effort in Louisiana. Although he did not have Bass's name, Henry still managed to find him in Marksville (the postmark on the letters), and Bass revealed that Edwin Epps held Solomon Northup on his plantation. Henry prepared legal paperwork based on the documentation proving Northup was free. The sheriff went with Henry to give the news to Epps and take Northup off the farm.

Northup later wrote, "He [Epps] thought of nothing but his loss, and cursed me for having been born free." Attorney Henry B. Northup convinced Epps that it would be futile to contest the free papers in a court of law, so the planter conceded the case. He signed papers giving up all claims to Northup. Finally, on January 4, 1853, four months after meeting Bass, Northup regained his freedom.

=== Twelve Years a Slave ===
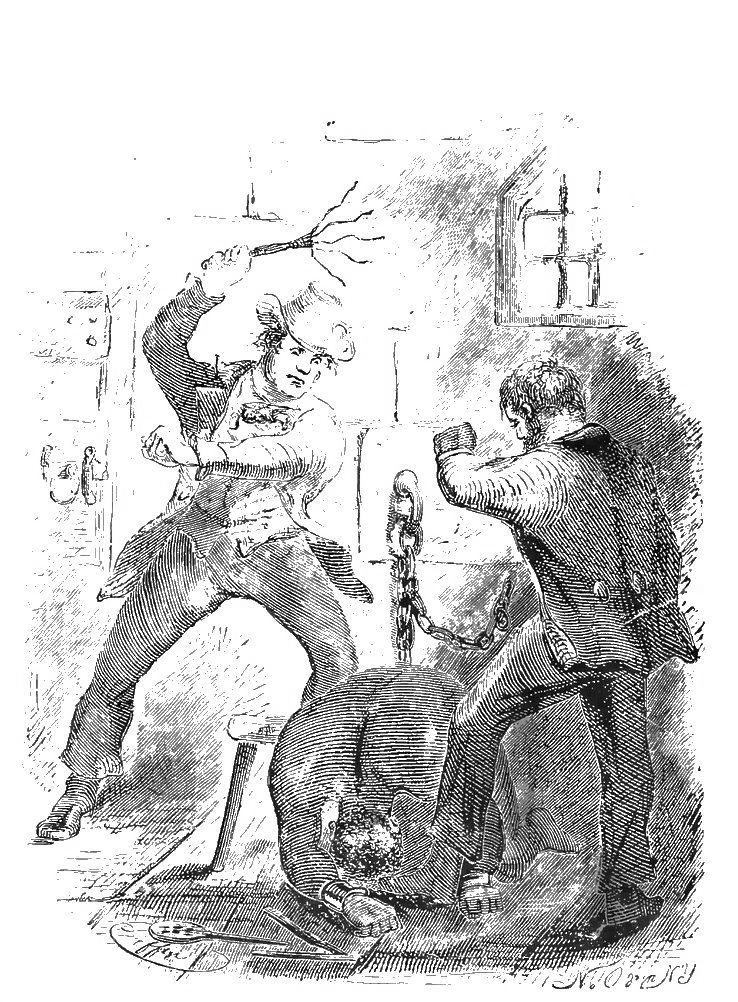
"Scene of the Slave Pen in Washington" after imploring that he was a free man, an illustration from Twelve Years A Slave (1853)

After he made it back to New York, Solomon Northup wrote and published his memoir, Twelve Years a Slave (1853). The book was written in three months with the help of David Wilson, a local lawyer and writer.

Northup told the story of his kidnapping and enslavement with many verifiable details. Northup told the cruelty, treatment as chattel, and the appreciated acts of kindness he received. "Its tone is much milder than we expected to see exhibited," according to the Rome Citizen of New York. The detail that he provided helped illuminate the depth of his experiences, and allowed for verification of what life was like on a plantation. Sue Eakin and Joseph Logsdon researched the facts from Northup's book and were able to verify many of the events and people and published their annotated version of the book in 1968. Edwin Epps, his slaveholder, stated that a greater part of the book was the truth to soldiers from the 114th New York Infantry Regiment that Epps met during the Civil War. Northup was literate and provided the facts without hyperbole in "plain and candid language", while Wilson corrected style, grammar, and inconsistencies.

It was published by Derby & Miller of Auburn, New York. In the period when questions of slavery generated debate and the novel Uncle Tom's Cabin (1852) by Harriet Beecher Stowe was a bestseller, Northup's book sold 30,000 copies within three years, also becoming a bestseller. Northup traveled and went on a lecture tour in Northeastern states to tell his story and sell books. The book became the backbone of other books about him, such as Solomon Northup: The Complete Story of the Author of Twelve Years a Slave.

=== Court cases ===
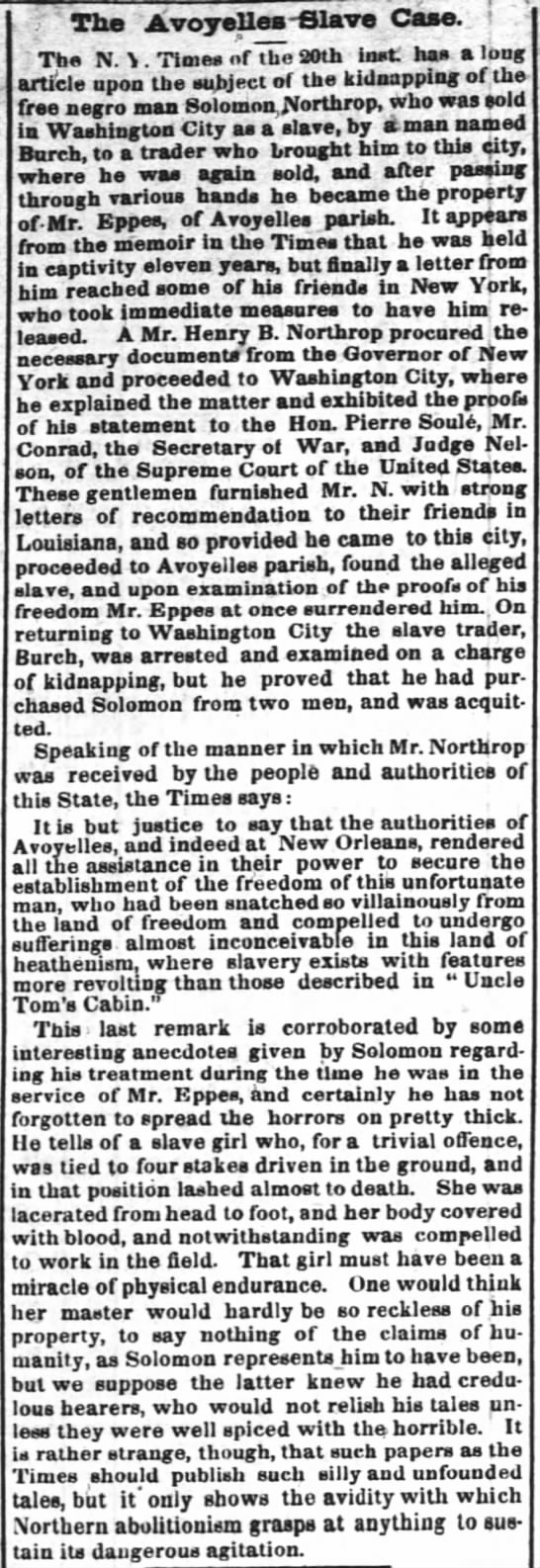
"The Avoyelles Slave Case", The Times-Picayune, February 6, 1853

Northup was one of the few kidnapped free black people to regain freedom after being sold into slavery. Represented by attorneys Senator Salmon P. Chase of Ohio, General Orville Clark, and Henry B. Northup, Solomon Northup sued Birch and other men involved in selling him into slavery in Washington, DC. The historian Carol Wilson documented 300 kidnapping cases in her 1994 book, and believes that it is likely that thousands more were kidnapped who were never documented.

As Solomon Northup and Henry Northup made their way back to New York, they first stopped in Washington, D.C., to file a legal complaint with the police magistrate against James H. Birch, the man who had first enslaved him. Birch was immediately arrested and tried on criminal charges. However, Northup could not testify at the trial due to laws in Washington, D.C., against black men testifying in court. Birch and several others who were also in the slave trade testified that Northup had approached them, saying he was an enslaved person from Georgia and was for sale. However, Birch's accounting ledger made no note of his purchase. The prosecution consisted of Henry B. Northup and another white man asserting that they had known Northup for many years, and he was born and lived a free man in New York until his abduction. With no one legally able to testify against Birch's tale, Birch was found not guilty. However, the sensational case immediately attracted national attention, and The New York Times published an article about the trial on January 20, 1853, just days after its conclusion and only two weeks after Northup's rescue.

The New York trial opened on October 4, 1854. Both Northup and St. John testified against the two men. The case brought widespread illegal practices in the domestic slave trade to light. Testimony during the court case confirmed various details of Northup's account of his experience. The respective counsels argued over whether the crime had been committed in New York (where Northup could testify), or in Washington, DC, outside the jurisdiction of New York courts. After more than two years of appeals, a new district attorney in New York failed to continue with the case and dropped it in May 1857.

=== Last years ===
Northup worked again as a carpenter after he moved back to New York. He became active in the abolitionist movement and lectured on slavery in the years before the American Civil War. In the summer of 1857, he traveled to Canada to deliver a series of lectures; however, in Streetsville, Ontario, a hostile crowd prevented him from speaking.

After 1857, he was not living with family and there was speculation by family, friends, and others that he was reenslaved. The 21st-century historians Clifford Brown and Carol Wilson believe it is likely that he died of natural causes, because he was too old to be of interest to slave catchers.

According to John R. Smith, in letters written in the 1930s, his father Rev. John L. Smith, a Methodist minister in Vermont, had worked with Northup and former slave Tabbs Gross in the early 1860s, during the Civil War, aiding fugitive slaves on the Underground Railroad. Northup was said to have visited Rev. Smith after Lincoln's Emancipation Proclamation, which was made in January 1863.

There is no contemporaneous documentation of his death. Historians believe that he died in 1863 or 1864.

== Historiography ==
Although the memoir is often classified among the genre of slave narratives, the scholar Sam Worley says that it does not fit the genre's standard format. Northup was assisted in the writing by David Wilson, a white man, and, according to Worley, some believed he would have biased the material. Worley discounted concerns that Wilson was pursuing his own interests in the book. He writes of the memoir:

Twelve Years is convincingly Northup's tale and no one else's because of its amazing attention to empirical detail and unwillingness to reduce the complexity of Northup's experience to a stark moral allegory.

Northup's biographer, David Fiske, has investigated Northup's role in the book's writing and asserts the authenticity of authorship. Northup's complete and descriptive account has been used by numerous historians researching slavery. His description of the "Yellow House" (also known as "The Williams Slave Pen"), in view of the Capitol, has helped researchers document the history of slavery in the District of Columbia. (Note: Northup described the slave pen owned by William Williams in Washington: "It was like a farmer's barnyard in most respects, save it was so constructed that the outside world could never see the human cattle that were herded there. The building to which the yard was attached, was two stories high, fronting on one of the public streets of Washington. Its outside presented only the appearance of a quiet private residence. A stranger looking at it, would never have dreamed of its execrable uses. Strange as it may seem, within plain sight of this same house, looking down from its commanding height upon it, was the Capitol. The voices of patriotic representatives boasting of freedom and equality, and the rattling of the poor slave's chains, almost commingled. A slave pen within the very shadow of the Capitol! Such is a correct description as it was in 1841, of Williams' slave pen in Washington, in one of the cellars of which I found myself so unaccountably confined." "Free blacks kidnapped, sold into slavery in the shadow of the U.S. Capitol", Washington Times October 20, 2013)

== Influence among scholars ==
- Ulrich B. Phillips, in his Life and Labor in the Old South (Boston, 1929) and American Negro Slavery (New York, 1918), doubted the "authenticity" of most narratives of ex-slaves but termed Northup's memoir "a vivid account of plantation life from the under side".
- The scholar Kenneth M. Stampp often referred to Northup's memoir in his book on slavery, The Peculiar Institution (New York, 1956). Stanley Elkins in his book, Slavery (Chicago, 1959), like Phillips and Stampp, found Northup's memoir to be of credible historical merit.
- Since the mid-20th century, the civil rights movement, and an increase in works of social history and in African American studies, have brought renewed interest in Northup's memoir.
- The first scholarly edition of the memoir was published in 1968. Co-edited by professors Sue Eakin and Joseph Logsdon, this well-annotated LSU Press publication has been used in classrooms and by scholars since that time and is still in print.
- In 1998, a team of students at Union College in Schenectady, New York, with their political science professor Clifford Brown, documented Northup's historic narrative. "They gathered photographs, family trees, bills of sale, maps and hospital records on a trail through New York, Washington [DC] and Louisiana." Their exhibit of this material was held at the college's Nott Memorial building.
- In his book Black Men Built the Capitol (2007), Jesse Holland notes his use of Northup's account. (Note: Another slave market was located at Robey's Tavern; these sites were located on what is now the Mall between the present-day Department of Education and the Smithsonian National Air and Space Museum, within view of the Capitol.)

== Legacy and honors ==
- In 1999, Saratoga Springs erected a historical marker at the corner of Congress and Broadway to commemorate Northup's life. The city later established the third Saturday in July as Solomon Northup Day, to honor him, bring regional African American history to light, and educate the public about freedom and justice issues.
- In 2000, the Library of Congress accepted the program of Solomon Northup Day into the permanent archives of the American Folklife Center. The Anacostia Community Museum and the National Park Service-Network to Freedom Project have also recognized the merits of this multi-venue, multi-cultural event program. "Solomon Northup Day – a Celebration of Freedom" continues annually in the City of Saratoga Springs, as well as in Plattsburgh, New York, with the support of the North Country Underground Railroad Historical Association.
- Annual observances have been made to honor Solomon Northup. A 2015 conference at Skidmore College had a gathering of Northup's descendants, and the speakers included Congressman Paul D. Tonko.
- On January 4, 2026 (the 173rd anniversary of his release from slavery), Hope Out of Darkness, a bronze statue of Northup created by American sculptor Wesley Wofford, will be unveiled in Marksville, Louisiana. Commissioned by the Solomon Northup Committee for Commemorative Works, the sculpture depicts Northup breaking free from chains with papers (his narrative) as a torch, symbolizing freedom and resilience.

=== Representation in media ===
- Former U.S. poet laureate and Pulitzer Prize winner Rita Dove wrote the poem "The Abduction" about Northup, published in her first collection, The Yellow House on the Corner (1980).
- In 1984, Twelve Years a Slave was adapted as a PBS television movie titled Solomon Northup's Odyssey, directed by Gordon Parks. Northup was portrayed by Avery Brooks.
- In 2008, composer and saxophonist T. K. Blue, commissioned by the New York State Council on the Arts (NYSCA), recorded Follow the North Star, a musical composition inspired by Northup's life.
- The episode "Division" of the 2010 television miniseries America: The Story of Us depicts Northup's slave auction. Significant emphasis is placed on Eliza being separated from her children, and the actor portraying Northup does voiceover of direct passages from Twelve Years a Slave.
- The 2013 feature film 12 Years a Slave, adapted from his memoir, was written by John Ridley and directed by Steve McQueen. British actor Chiwetel Ejiofor portrays Northup, for which he earned an Oscar nomination for Best Actor in a Leading Role. The film was nominated for nine Academy Awards, winning 3 – for Best Picture, Best Adapted Screenplay, for John Ridley, and Best Supporting Actress for Lupita Nyong'o, who played the slave Patsey in her debut film role.

== See also ==
- History of slavery in Louisiana
- List of people who disappeared
- List of slaves
- List of unsolved deaths
- Slavery in the United States
- Reverse Underground Railroad

== Sources ==
- Fiske, David; Brown, Clifford W. Jr.; Seligman, Rachel (2013). Solomon Northup: The Complete Story of the Author of Twelve Years A Slave: The Complete Story of the Author of Twelve Years a Slave. ABC-CLIO. ISBN 978-1-4408-2975-8.
- Fradin, Judith Bloom; Fradin, Dennis Brindell (2012). Stolen into Slavery: The True Story of Solomon Northup, Free Black Man. National Geographic Books. ISBN 978-1-4263-0987-8.
- Nelson, Emmanuel Sampath (2002). "Solomon Northup (1808–1863?)". In Marsden, Elizabeth (ed.). African American Autobiographers: A Sourcebook. Greenwood Publishing Group. p. 290. ISBN 978-0-313-31409-4.
- Northup, Solomon; Wilson, David (1853). Twelve Years a Slave. Auburn: Derby and Miller; Buffalo: Derby, Orton and Mulligan; London: Sampson Low, Son & Company.
