= Ulrich B. Phillips =

American historian of slavery and the South (1877-1934)

Ulrich Bonnell Phillips
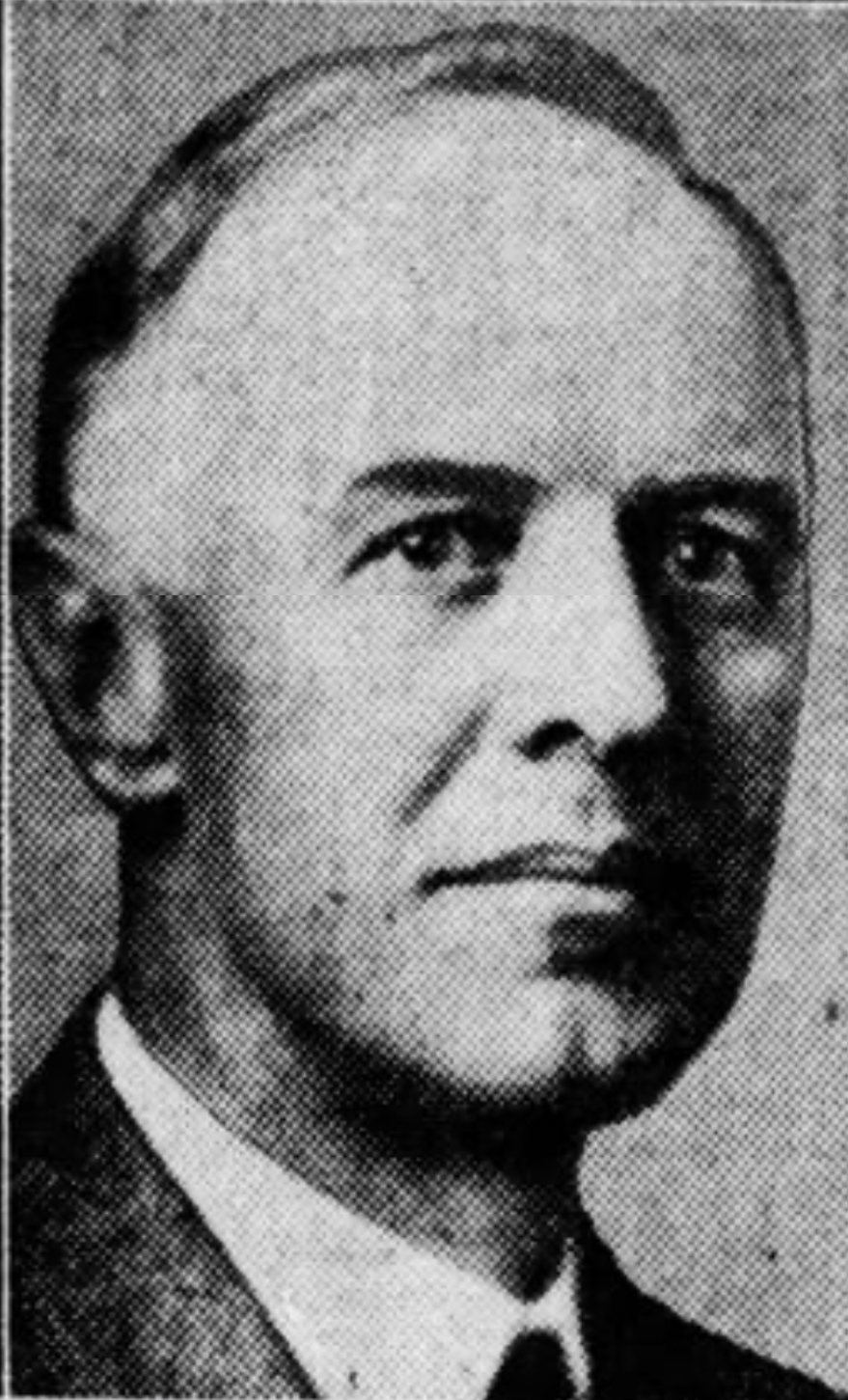
- Phillips in 1928
- Born: November 4, 1877; La Grange, Georgia
- Died: January 21, 1934 (aged 56)

Academic background
- Education: University of Georgia; Columbia University
- Academic advisor: Frederick Jackson Turner William Archibald Dunning

Academic work
- Institutions: University of Wisconsin–Madison; Tulane University; University of Michigan; Yale University
- Main interests: Slavery; Old South

Ulrich Bonnell Phillips (November 4, 1877 – January 21, 1934) was an American historian who largely defined the field of the social and economic studies of the history of the Antebellum South and slavery in the U.S. Phillips, a Southerner from a slave-owning family, concentrated on the large plantations that dominated the Southern economy, and he did not investigate the numerous small farmers who held few slaves. He concluded that plantation slavery produced great wealth, but was a dead end, economically, that left the South bypassed by the industrial revolution underway in the North.

Phillips concluded that plantation slavery was not very profitable, had about reached its geographical limits in 1860, and would probably have faded away without the American Civil War, which he considered a needless conflict. He praised the entrepreneurship of plantation owners and denied they were brutal. Phillips argued that they provided adequate food, clothing, housing, medical care and training in modern technology—that they formed a "school" which helped "civilize" the slaves. He admitted the failure was that no one graduated from this school.

Phillips systematically hunted down and revealed plantation records such as masters' diaries and unused manuscript sources; he paid much less attention to the personal accounts of the enslaved. An example of pioneering comparative work was "A Jamaica Slave Plantation" (1914). His methods and use of sources shaped the research agenda of most succeeding scholars, even those who disagreed with his favorable treatment of the masters. After the civil rights movement of the 1960s historians turned their focus away from his emphasis on the material well-being of the slaves to the slaves' own cultural constructs and efforts to achieve freedom.

By turning away from the political debates about slavery that divided North and South, Phillips made the economics and social structure of slavery the main theme in 20th century scholarship. Together with his highly eloquent writing style, his new approach made him the most influential historian of the antebellum south.

== Life and career ==
Phillip was born on November 4, 1877, in LaGrange, Georgia; his parents were Alonzo R. and Jessie Young Phillips. He graduated with a Bachelor of Arts degree from the University of Georgia in 1897. He obtained his Master of Arts degree from UGA as well in 1899 and his Ph.D. in 1902 from Columbia University where he studied under William Dunning, making his work part of the Dunning School. His dissertation, Georgia and State Rights won the Justin Winsor Prize in 1901 and was published by the American Historical Association.

Phillips was especially influenced by Frederick Jackson Turner who invited Phillips to the University of Wisconsin where Phillips taught from 1902 to 1908. He taught for three years at Tulane University. In 1911, Phillips moved to the University of Michigan where he taught until 1929 when he left to teach at Yale as Professor of American History until his death in 1934. In the 1920s he spent a year in Africa traveling and doing research. He received an honorary D. Litt. from Columbia University in 1929.

Phillips married Lucil Mayo-Smith on February 22, 1911, and had three children: Ulrich, Mabel, and Worthington.

== Historiography ==
=== Influence ===
Phillips was seen as the first historian to seriously tackle the practice of slavery and was very influential into the 1950s.

Frederic Bancroft's 1931 Slave-Trading in the Old South was a direct attack on Phillips and his school of thought; as historian Michael Tadman explained, "Where Phillips had emphasized slaveholder benevolence, Bancroft saw self‐interest. With Bancroft, the emphasis switched from proslavery to abolitionist traditions—and switched to the cruelty and immorality of slavery, to family separations and slave breeding, and to the everyday presence of the trader in every corner of the South." Bancroft's scholarly attack on the "benevolent paternalism" theory of slavery was so comprehensive that, per the Journal of Negro History book review in April 1931, "It will be necessary [for slavery apologists] to work out another program to cover up the truth for another fifty years."

Some of Phillips' views were rejected by a generation of historians in the 1950s with the publication of Kenneth Stampp's The Peculiar Institution seen as a particular landmark in that refutation.

The ideas were revived again from the mid 1960s onwards, particularly by Eugene Genovese, a Marxist historian. As Harvard Sitkoff wrote in 1986, "[I]n the mid-1960s Eugene D. Genovese launched a rehabilitation of Phillips that still continues. Today, as in Phillips' lifetime, scholars again commonly acknowledge the value of many of his insights into the nature of the southern class structure and master-slave relationships." In his own right, Genovese recognized in Phillips' work, as many of his colleagues chose to ignore, that master-slave relationships were complex, multi-faceted, more often negative, exploitive, and dehumanizing, yet provided very limited opportunities for some bondsmen to earn cash, travel outside the plantation situation, and enhance their personal values.

=== Race ===
Phillips has been described as a white supremacist historian and building many of his views on an ideology of white supremacism. John David Smith of North Carolina State University argues:

[Phillips was] a conservative, proslavery interpreter of slavery and the slaves ... In Life and Labor in the Old South Phillips failed to revise his interpretation of slavery significantly. His basic arguments—the duality of slavery as an economic cancer but a vital mode of racial control—can be traced back to his earliest writings. Less detailed but more elegantly written than American Negro Slavery, Phillips's Life and Labor was a general synthesis rather than a monograph. His racism appeared less pronounced in Life and Labor because of its broad scope. Fewer racial slurs appeared in 1929 than in 1918, but Phillips's prejudice remained. The success of Life and Labor earned Phillips the year-long Albert Kahn Foundation Fellowship in 1929-30 to observe blacks and other laborers worldwide. In 1929 Yale University in New Haven, Connecticut, appointed Phillips professor of history.

Phillips contended that masters treated slaves relatively well. His views were rejected most sharply by Kenneth M. Stampp in the 1950s. However, to a large degree Phillips' interpretive model of the dynamic between master and slave was revived by Eugene Genovese, who wrote that Phillips's "work, taken as a whole, remains the best and most subtle introduction to antebellum Southern history and especially to the problems posed by race and class." In 1963, C. Vann Woodward wrote: "Much of what Phillips wrote has not been superseded or seriously challenged and remains indispensable."

Peter Kolchin described the state of historiography in the early 20th century as follows:

During the first half of the twentieth century, a major component of this approach was often simply racism, manifest in the belief that blacks were, at best, imitative of whites. Thus Ulrich B. Phillips, the era's most celebrated and influential expert on slavery, combined a sophisticated portrait of the white planters' life and behavior with crude passing generalizations about the life and behavior of their black slaves.

Historians James Oliver Horton and Lois E. Horton described Phillips's mindset, methodology and influence:

His portrayal of blacks as passive, inferior people, whose African origins made them uncivilized, seemed to provide historical evidence for the theories of racial inferiority that supported racial segregation. Drawing evidence exclusively from plantation records, letters, southern newspapers, and other sources reflecting the slaveholder's point of view, Phillips depicted slave masters who provided for the welfare of their slaves and contended that true affection existed between master and slave.

=== Pro-slavery bias ===
Phillips denied he was proslavery. He was an intellectual leader of the Progressive Movement and slavery, in his interpretation, was inefficient and antithetical to the principles of progressivism. Phillips (1910) explained in detail why slavery was a failed system. It is Smith's opinion that:

Phillips's contributions to the study of slavery clearly outweigh his deficiencies. Neither saint nor sinner, he was subject to the same forces-- bias, selectivity of evidence, inaccuracy--that plague us all. Descended from slave owners and reared in the rural South, he dominated slave historiography in an era when Progressivism was literally for whites only. Of all scholars, historians can ill afford to be anachronistic. Phillips was no more a believer in white supremacy than other leading contemporary white scholars.

W. E. B. Du Bois criticized Phillips's 1918 book American Negro Slavery, writing that it was a "defense of American slavery" and that Phillips engaged in the special pleading fallacy.

== Views ==
=== Inefficiency of plantation slavery ===
Phillips argued that large-scale plantation slavery was inefficient and not progressive. It had reached its geographical limits by 1860 or so, and eventually had to fade away (as happened in Brazil). In 1910, he argued in "The Decadence of the Plantation System" that slavery was an unprofitable relic that persisted because it produced social status, honor, and political power, that is, Slave Power.

Phillips' economic conclusions about the inefficiency of slavery were challenged by Alfred H. Conrad and John R. Meyer, and Robert Fogel in the 1950s and 1960s, who argued that slavery was both efficient and profitable as long as the price of cotton was high enough. In turn Fogel came under sharp attack by other scholars.

An essay by the historians George M. Fredrickson and Christopher Lasch (1967) analyzed limitations of both Phillips and his critics. They argued that far too much attention was given to slave "treatment" in examining the social and psychological effects of slavery on Afro-Americans. They said Phillips had defined the treatment issue and his most severe critics had failed to redefine it:

By compiling instances of the kindness and benevolence of masters, Phillips proved to his satisfaction that slavery was a mild and permissive institution, the primary function of which was not so much to produce a marketable surplus as to ease the accommodation of the lower race into the culture of the higher. The critics of Phillips have tried to meet him on his own ground. Where he compiled lists of indulgences and benefactions, they have assembled lists of atrocities. Both methods suffer from the same defect: they attempt to solve a conceptual problem—what did slavery do to the slave?—by accumulating quantitative evidence.... The only conclusion that one can legitimately draw from this debate is that great variations in treatment existed from plantation to plantation.

=== Race as "central theme" of Southern history ===
In "The Central Theme of Southern History" (1928), Phillips maintained that the desire to keep their region "a white man's country" united the white southerners for centuries. Phillips' emphasis on race was overshadowed in the late 1920s and 1930s by the Beardian interpretation of Charles A. Beard and Mary Ritter Beard, who in their enormously successful The Rise of American Civilization (1927) emphasized class conflict and downplayed slavery and race relations as a cause of the American Civil War. By the 1950s, however, the Beardian economic determinism was out of fashion, and the emphasis on race (rather than region or class) became a major topic in historiography.

By 2000, Jane Dailey, Glenda Gilmore, and Bryant Simon argue by citing Phillips:

The ways in which white southerners "met" the race "problem" have intrigued historians writing about post-Civil War southern politics since at least 1928, when Ulrich B. Phillips pronounced race relations the "central theme" of southern history. What contemporaries referred to as "the race question" may be phrased more bluntly today as the struggle for white domination. Establishing and maintaining this domination--creating the system of racial segregation and African American disfranchisement known as Jim Crow--has remained a preoccupation of southern historians.

In his review of Complicity: How the North Promoted, Prolonged, and Profited From Slavery by Anne Farrow, Joel Lang and Jenifer Frank, the historian Ira Berlin wrote, "Slavery in the North, like its counterpart in the South, was a brutal, violent relationship that fostered white supremacy. Complicity's authors shred the notion, famously advanced by the Yale historian U.B. Phillips, that the central theme of Southern history was the region's desire to remain a white man's country. Phillips was not so much wrong about the centrality of white supremacy to the South as blind to its presence in the North."

== Works ==
For a comprehensive annotated guide see Fred Landon and Everett E. Edwards, "A Bibliography of the Writings of Professor Ulrich Bonnell Phillips," (1934).

- Georgia and State Rights: A Study of the Political History of Georgia from the Revolution to the Civil War, with Particular Regard to Federal Relations. American Historical Association Report for the Year 1901, Vol. 2. Washington: Government Printing Office, 1902, his dissertation, earned him the Justin Winsor Prize awarded by the American Historical Association (reprint 1983) online edition
- A History of Transportation in the Eastern Cotton Belt to 1860. (1908). online edition
- The Life of Robert Toombs. (1913). online edition
- American Negro Slavery: A Survey of the Supply, Employment, and Control of Negro Labor, as Determined by the Plantation Regime. (1918; reprint 1966)online at Project Gutenberg; online at Internet Archive
- Life and Labor in the Old South. (1929). excerpts and text search
- The Course of the South to Secession: An Interpretation. (1939). online edition

Edited

- Plantation and Frontier Documents, 1649–1863; Illustrative of Industrial History in the Colonial and Antebellum South: Collected from MSS. and Other Rare Sources. 2 Volumes. (1909). vol 1&2 online edition
- The Correspondence of Robert Toombs, Alexander H. Stephens, and Howell Cobb. Annual Report of the American Historical Association for the Year 1911, Vol. 2. Washington: 1913.
- Florida Plantation Records from the Papers of George Noble Jones. (coedited with James D. Glunt). (1927).

Articles

- Phillips, Ulrich B. (1905). "Transportation in the Antebellum South: An Economic Analysis". Quarterly Journal of Economics. 19 (3): 434–451. doi:10.2307/1882660. hdl:2027/hvd.32044072050750. JSTOR 1882660.
- Phillips, Ulrich B. (1905). "The Economic Cost of Slaveholding in the Cotton Belt". Political Science Quarterly. 20 (2): 257–275. doi:10.2307/2140400. hdl:2027/hvd.32044082042185. JSTOR 2140400.
- Phillips, Ulrich B. (1906). "The Origin and Growth of the Southern Black Belts". American Historical Review. 11 (4): 798–816. doi:10.2307/1832229. JSTOR 1832229.
- Phillips, Ulrich Bonnell (1907). "The Slave Labor Problem in the Charleston District". Political Science Quarterly. 22 (3): 416–439. doi:10.2307/2141056. hdl:2027/mdp.39015016878723. JSTOR 2141056.
- Phillips, Ulrich B. (1909). "The South Carolina Federalists, I". American Historical Review. 14 (3): 529–543. doi:10.2307/1836445. JSTOR 1836445.
- Phillips, Ulrich B. (1909). "The South Carolina Federalists, II". American Historical Review. 14 (4): 731–743. doi:10.2307/1837058. JSTOR 1837058.
- Phillips, Ulrich Bonnell (1910). "The Southern Whigs, 1834-1854". Essays in American History Dedicated to Frederick Jackson Turner. H. Holt. pp. 203–229.
- Phillips, Ulrich B (1910). "The Decadence of the Plantation System". Annals of the American Academy of Political and Social Science. 35 (1): 37–41. doi:10.1177/000271621003500105. JSTOR 1011487. S2CID 144813314.
- Phillips, Ulrich B. (1914). "A Jamaica Slave Plantation". American Historical Review. 19 (3): 543–548. doi:10.2307/1835078. hdl:2027/loc.ark:/13960/t77s8hf3b. JSTOR 1835078.
- Phillips, Ulrich B. (1915). "Slave Crime in Virginia". American Historical Review. 20 (2): 336–340. doi:10.2307/1835473. JSTOR 1835473.
- Phillips, Ulrich Bonnell (1922). "Michigan" . In Chisholm, Hugh (ed.). Encyclopædia Britannica (12th ed.). London & New York: The Encyclopædia Britannica Company.
- Phillips, Ulrich B. (1925). "Plantations with Slave Labor and Free". American Historical Review. 30 (4): 738–753. doi:10.2307/1835667. hdl:2027/mdp.39015010479486. JSTOR 1835667.
- Phillips, Ulrich B. (1928). "The Central Theme of Southern History". American Historical Review. 34 (1): 30–43. doi:10.2307/1836477. JSTOR 1836477.
- "Calhoun, John Caldwell, 1782 - 1850" Dictionary of American Biography (1929) 3:411-419; 7400 words
- Phillips, Ulrich Bonnell (1945). "The Traits and Contributions of Frederick Jackson Turner". Agricultural History. 19 (1): 21–23. JSTOR 3739695.
- Slave Economy of the Old South: Selected Essays in Economic and Social History. Louisiana State U.P. 1968.

== Bibliography ==
- Dillon, Merton Lynn. Ulrich Bonnell Phillips: Historian of the Old South (1985), biography.
- Fogel, Robert William, and Engerman, Stanley L. Time on the Cross: The Economics of American Negro Slavery, (1974), 1995 reissue, New York: Norton, ISBN 978-0-393-31218-8.
- Fogel, Robert William. The Slavery Debates, 1952-1990: A Retrospective Louisiana State University Press, 2003. ISBN 0-8071-2881-3, chapter 1.
- Genovese, Eugene D. "Race and Class in Southern History: An Appraisal of the Work of Ulrich Bonnell Phillips." Agricultural History, 41 (October, 1967): 345-358. in JSTOR
- Genovese, Eugene D. "Ulrich Bonnell Phillips & His Critics." [Introduction to] Ulrich Bonnell Phillips. American Negro Slavery: A Survey of the Supply, Employment and Control of Negro Labor as Determined by the Plantation Regime Louisiana State University Press, 1966, pages vii-xxi.
- Hofstadter Richard. "U.B. Phillips and the Plantation Legend." Journal of Negro History, 29 (April, 1944): 109-124. in JSTOR
- Horton, James Oliver; Horton, Lois E. (2006). Slavery and the Making of America. Oxford University Press. ISBN 978-0-1953-0451-0.
- Kolchin, Peter (1993). American Slavery: 1619–1877.
- Kugler, Ruben F. "U.B. Phillips' Use of Sources." Journal of Negro History, 47 (July, 1962): 153-168. in JSTOR
- Landon, Fred, and Everett E. Edwards. "A Bibliography of the Writings of Professor Ulrich Bonnell Phillips," Agricultural History, Vol. 8, No. 4 (Oct., 1934), pp. 196–218 in JSTOR
- Parish, Peter J. Slavery: history and historians (2nd. ed. 1990)
- Potter, David M. "The Work of Ulrich B. Phillips: A Comment." Agricultural History, 41 (October, 1967): 359-363. in JSTOR
- Pressly, Thomas J. "Ulrich B. Phillips." In Americans Interpret Their Civil War (Princeton University Press, 1962), pages 265-272.
- Roper, John Herbert. U.B. Phillips: A Southern Mind Mercer University Press, 1984.
- Singal, Daniel Joseph. "Ulrich B. Phillips: The Old South as the New," Journal of American History, 63 (March, 1977): 871-891. in JSTOR
- Smith, John David. An Old Creed for the New South: Proslavery Ideology and Historiography, 1865-1918 Greenwood Press, 1985, Chapter 8.
- Smith, John David; Inscoe, John C. (1990). Smith, John David; Inscoe, John C. (eds.). Ulrich Bonnell Phillips: A Southern Historian and His Critics. Archived from the original on October 15, 2012 – via Questia. Essays by leading scholars, pro and con.
- Smith, John David. "Ulrich Bonnell Phillips (1877-1934)" in The New Georgia Encyclopedia (2003) online version
- Smith, John David. Slavery, Race and American History: Historical Conflict, Trends and Method, 1866-1953 (1999)
- Smith, John David. "U. B. Phillips, the North Carolina State Literary and Historical Association, and the Course of the South to Secession," North Carolina Historical Review, (2010) 87#3 pp 253–282
- Stampp Kenneth M. "The Historian and Southern Negro Slavery." American Historical Review, 57 (April, 1952): 613-624. in JSTOR
- Stampp, Kenneth (1956). The Peculiar Institution: Slavery in the Ante-Bellum South. New York: Vintage Books. ISBN 978-0-394-70253-7.
- Stampp Kenneth M. "Reconsidering U.B. Phillips: A Comment." Agricultural History, 41 (October, 1967): 365-368. in JSTOR
- Stephenson Wendell H. "Ulrich B. Phillips: Historian of Aristocracy." in The South Lives in History: Southern Historians and Their Legacy Louisiana State University Press, 1955, pages 58–94.
- Tindall George B. "The Central Theme Revisited." In Charles G. Sellers Jr., ed. The Southerner as American University of North Carolina Press, 1960, pages 104-129.
- Wish Harvey. "Ulrich B. Phillips and the Image of the Old South." in Wish, The American Historian: A Social-Intellectual History of the Writing of the American Past Oxford University Press, 1960, pp. 236–264.
- Wood, Kirk. "Ulrich B. Phillips." In Clyde N. Wilson, ed. Dictionary of Literary Biography, Twentieth-Century American Historians. Gale Research, 1983, pages 350-363.
- Wood, Peter H. (Autumn 1975). "Review: Phillips Upside Down: Dialectic or Equivocation?". The Journal of Interdisciplinary History. 6 (2). The MIT Press: 289–297. doi:10.2307/202235. JSTOR 202235.
- Woodward C. Vann. "Introduction" in Ulrich B. Phillips. Life and Labor in the Old South. Boston: Little, Brown and Company, 1963, pages iii-vi.
