= The peculiar institution =

The peculiar institution may refer to:

- A euphemism for slavery in the United States
- The Peculiar Institution, a book by Kenneth Stampp about slavery in the United States
