= Edwin Epps House =

Creole cottage built in 1852 in Avoyelles Parish, Louisiana

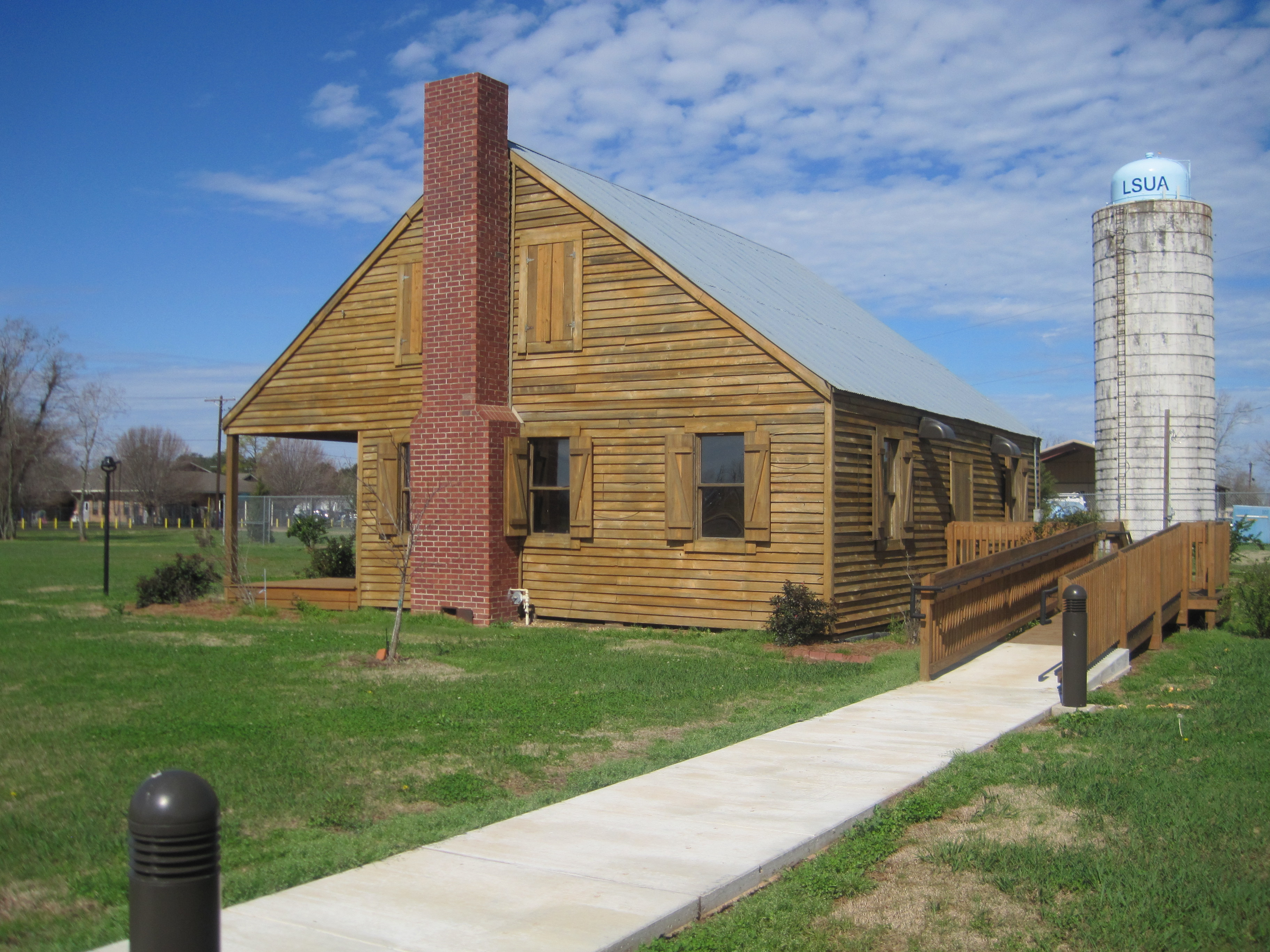
Restored Epps plantation house. Now located on the Louisiana State University of Alexandria campus (31°10′31″N 92°24′53″W)

Edwin Epps House is a Creole cottage built in 1852 (174 years ago) in part by Solomon Northup on Bayou Boeuf near Holmesville in Avoyelles Parish, Louisiana. It was built for Edwin Epps, a slaveholder. The house was a "double-sided, wood frame house with one chimney, and a tin roof" of mid-sized farmers. The Edwin Epps Plantation Site, where the house originally stood, is located off of LA 1176 on Carl Hunt Road. It is one of the historic sites of Solomon Northup's enslavement on the Northup Trail.

== Solomon Northup ==
The house figures in the life of Solomon Northup who built the house and where Epps is reported to have learned that Northup, who he had owned for ten years, was a free man. A team, including Sue Eakin, a history professor at Louisiana State University-Alexandria, researched Northup's book Twelve Years A Slave for accuracy and published a new version of the book in the 1960s. As part of the research, she found the house that Northup built, the Edwin Epps House. Over 150 years, the storms and time had decayed the original house.

== Relocation ==
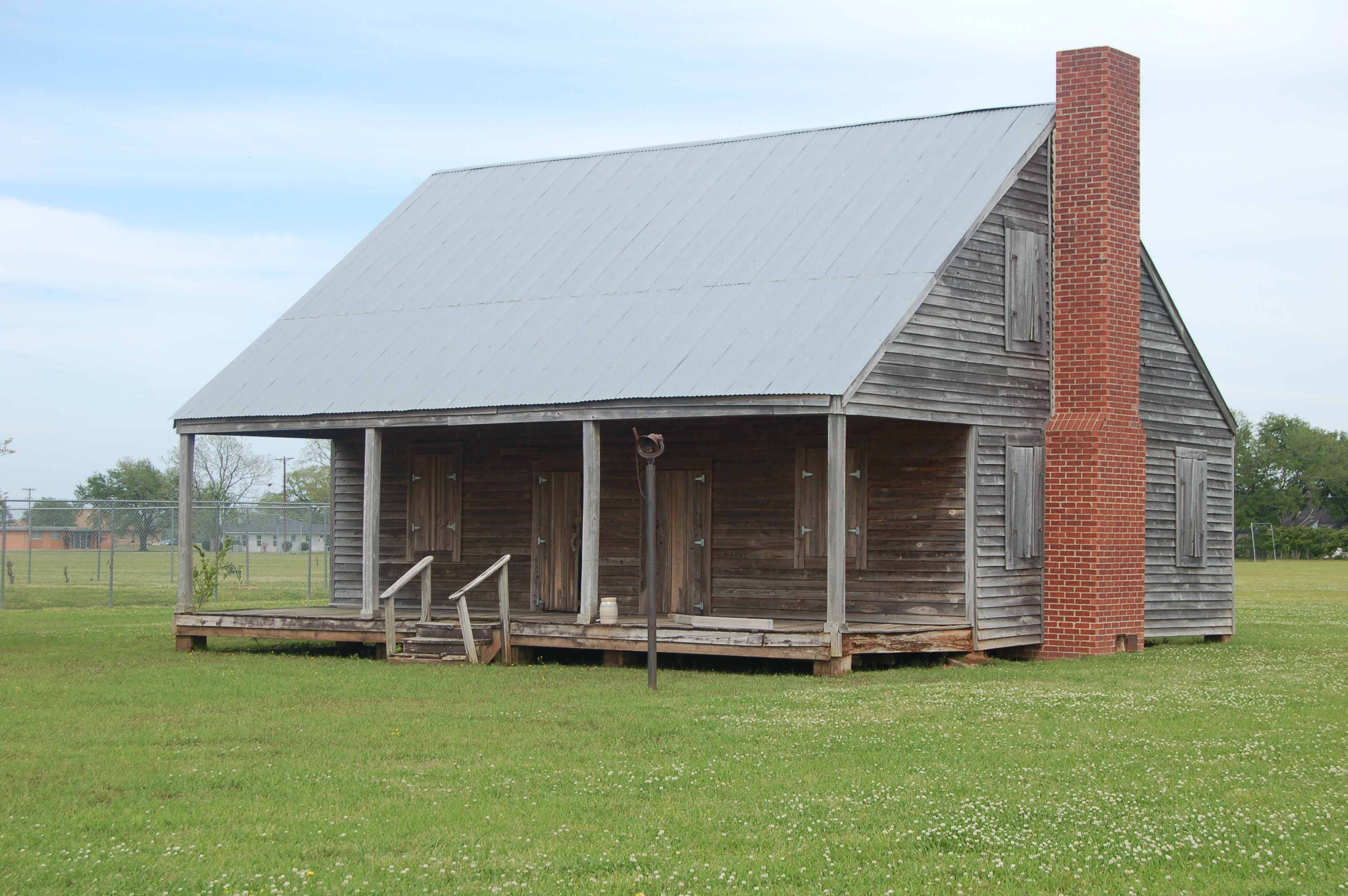
Edwin Epps House, now located on the ground of Louisiana State University of Alexandria, is a stop along Northup's Trail. Solomon Northup and Samuel Bass helped build the house that was completed in 1852.

The house was relocated twice. In 1976, it was moved to nearby Bunkie. It was on the National Register of Historic Places from April 12, 1984, because it was important to the "history in the areas of literature and social/humanitarian because of its close association with the famous slave narrative Twelve Years a Slave.

In 1999, the house was dismantled, during which some original building materials were replaced, and reconstructed on the Louisiana State University of Alexandria. It was purchased for their Center for Studies of Life on Plantations.

The relocation, among modern buildings, is said to "[destroy] the integrity of location and setting, and can create a false sense of historic development." It was delisted from the National Register of Historic Places in 2017.

The house was moved to the university to be used as a museum to help tell the story of plantation life, including the inhumanity towards and lack of freedom of the enslaved people. There is a room in the house that is dedicated to telling Northup's story. Other rooms tell of life on a plantation.

A historical marker erected near the site reads:

Built in 1852 by Edwin Epps. Originally located near Holmesville on Bayou Boeuf about three miles away. From 1843 to 1853, Epps, a small planter, owned Solomon Northup, author of famous slave narrative Twelve Years A Slave.
