= Louisiana State University of Alexandria =

Public college in Alexandria, Louisiana, U.S.

- Former names: Louisiana State University at Alexandria (1959–2014)
- Type: Public college
- Established: 1959; 67 years ago
- Parent institution: Louisiana State University System
- Chancellor: Paul Coreil, Ph.D.
- Students: 7,728
- Undergraduates: 7,728
- Location: Alexandria, Louisiana, United States
- Campus: Rural, 218 acres
- Colors: Purple and gold
- Nickname: Generals
- Sporting affiliations: NAIA – RRAC
- Website: lsua.edu
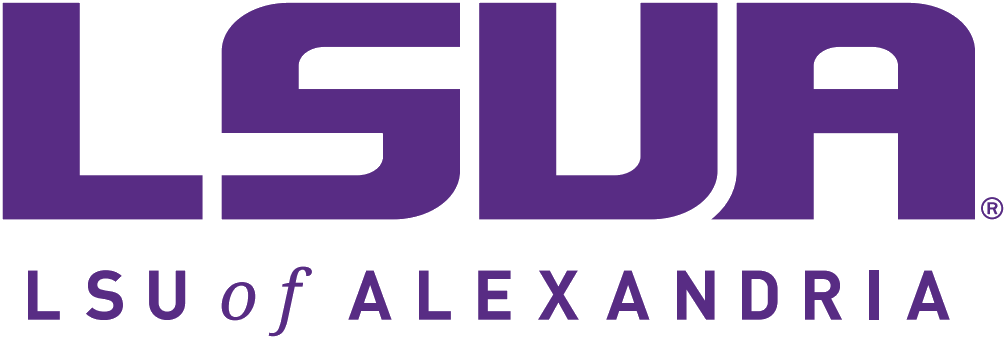

Louisiana State University of Alexandria (LSU of Alexandria or LSUA, formerly Louisiana State University at Alexandria) is a public college in Alexandria, Louisiana. It is Louisiana's singular undergraduate-only public institution and it offers undergraduate degrees in numerous disciplines. The university is a unit of the LSU System and operates under the auspices of the Louisiana Board of Regents. As of Fall 2025, LSUA had an enrollment of 7,684 students which is recorded as the highest in the university's history. The institution is located eight miles south of downtown Alexandria.

== History ==
In 1959, the Louisiana Legislature authorized the establishment of LSUA as a two-year college under the governance of the LSU Board of Supervisors. LSUA registered its first students in 1960 and initiated its first degree program, an Associate in Nursing, in 1964. The additional academic divisions of Liberal Arts, Business Administration, and Sciences were developed in 1967. In 1974, LSUA was accredited by the Commission on Colleges of the Southern Association of Colleges and Schools (SACS) to award associate degrees. Over the next 15 years, several associate degree and certificate programs were added.

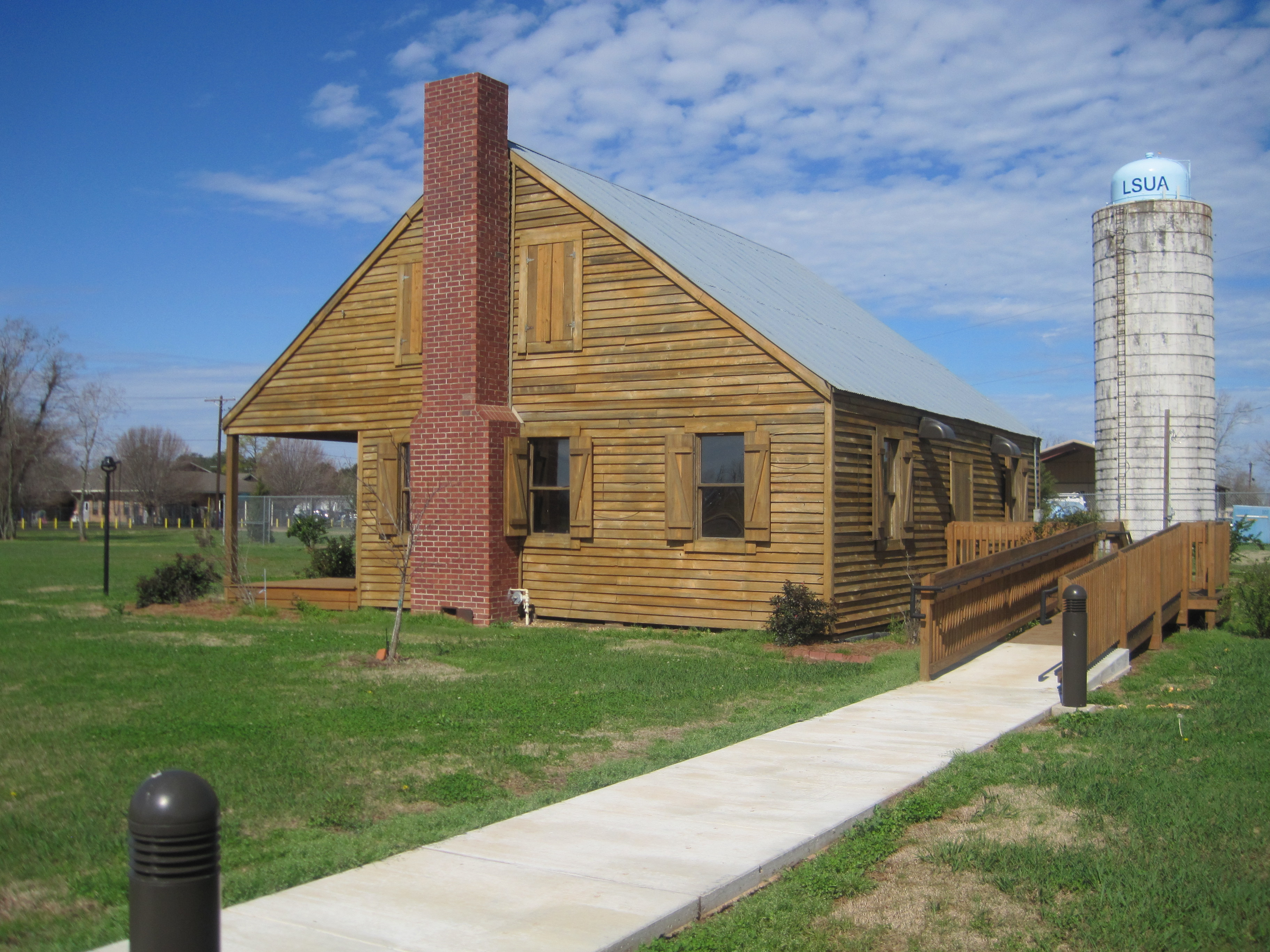
The Edwin Epps House, a plantation home, moved from Bunkie, Louisiana, to the LSUA campus in 1999. Solomon Northup, author of Twelve Years a Slave, was enslaved by Edwin Epps in the nineteenth century and he built this house with Samuel Bass and others.

From 1976 through 2003, Louisiana State University offered the upper-level course work for select bachelor's degree programs on the LSUA campus through a program known as LSU Senior College. Initially, the Bachelor of Science in Business Administration and Bachelor of General Studies were offered. The Bachelor of Science in Elementary Education was added in 1982.

In 2001, with approval by the Louisiana State University Board of Supervisors and the Louisiana Board of Regents, the Louisiana Legislature passed legislation (Senate Bill 853) allowing Louisiana State University of Alexandria to offer baccalaureate degrees. In 2002, SACS granted accreditation to the university to award both associate and baccalaureate degrees. The following year LSUA was reorganized into colleges and departments rather than divisions. The College of Arts and Sciences consisted of the departments of Arts, English and Humanities; Behavioral and Social Sciences; Biological Sciences; and Mathematics and Physical Sciences. The College of Professional Studies consisted of the departments of Allied Health, Business Administration, Education, and Nursing.

LSUA offered four baccalaureate degrees in fall 2003: the Bachelor of Science in biology, the Bachelor of General Studies, the Bachelor of Science in elementary education, and the Bachelor of Liberal Studies. Because there were students at LSUA who had completed upper-level course work through LSU Senior College, LSUA was able to produce its first bachelor's degree graduates in December 2003. The university added a Bachelor of Science in psychology in 2005 and a Bachelor of Science in mathematics in 2006. The Department of Education now offers the Bachelor of Science in elementary education and alternative certification in the areas of elementary education, grades 1–5; health and physical education, grades K–12; and secondary education, grades 6–12, for the disciplines of biology, English, history, and mathematics. Students who major in biology, English, history, or mathematics may declare secondary education as a minor in these areas of study, earning certification to teach that subject in grades 6–12. Add–on certifications are available for early childhood education (PK–3) and special education in area of existing certification(s).

In 2013 new bachelor's degree programs were added in Elder Care and Medical Laboratory Science. Paul Coreil, Ph.D., who retired in 2012 as Vice Chancellor and Director of the Cooperative Extension Service of the Louisiana State University Agricultural Center, was appointed Interim Chancellor of LSUA in 2013. In March 2014, Daniel Howard, PhD, became the new chancellor. He came to LSUA from Arkansas State University where he had been Vice Chancellor for Academic Affairs and Interim Chancellor. Immediately before that, Dr. Howard served for fifteen years as a vice president at the University of North Alabama.

In December 2013, it was announced that LSUA decided to rebrand the school which started in January 2014. Among the changes, the school was no longer recognized as Louisiana State University at Alexandria and was changed to LSU of Alexandria. Other changes included a new logo and school colors similar to the LSU flagship campus itself. The change coincided with a "high-energy marketing campaign incorporating traditional, social and direct marketing tactics" according to the school's release. The changes were also part of the One LSU initiative, which aimed to increase LSU's impact by tying their campuses closer together. For the school's athletics, the change did not occur until the fall semester of 2014.

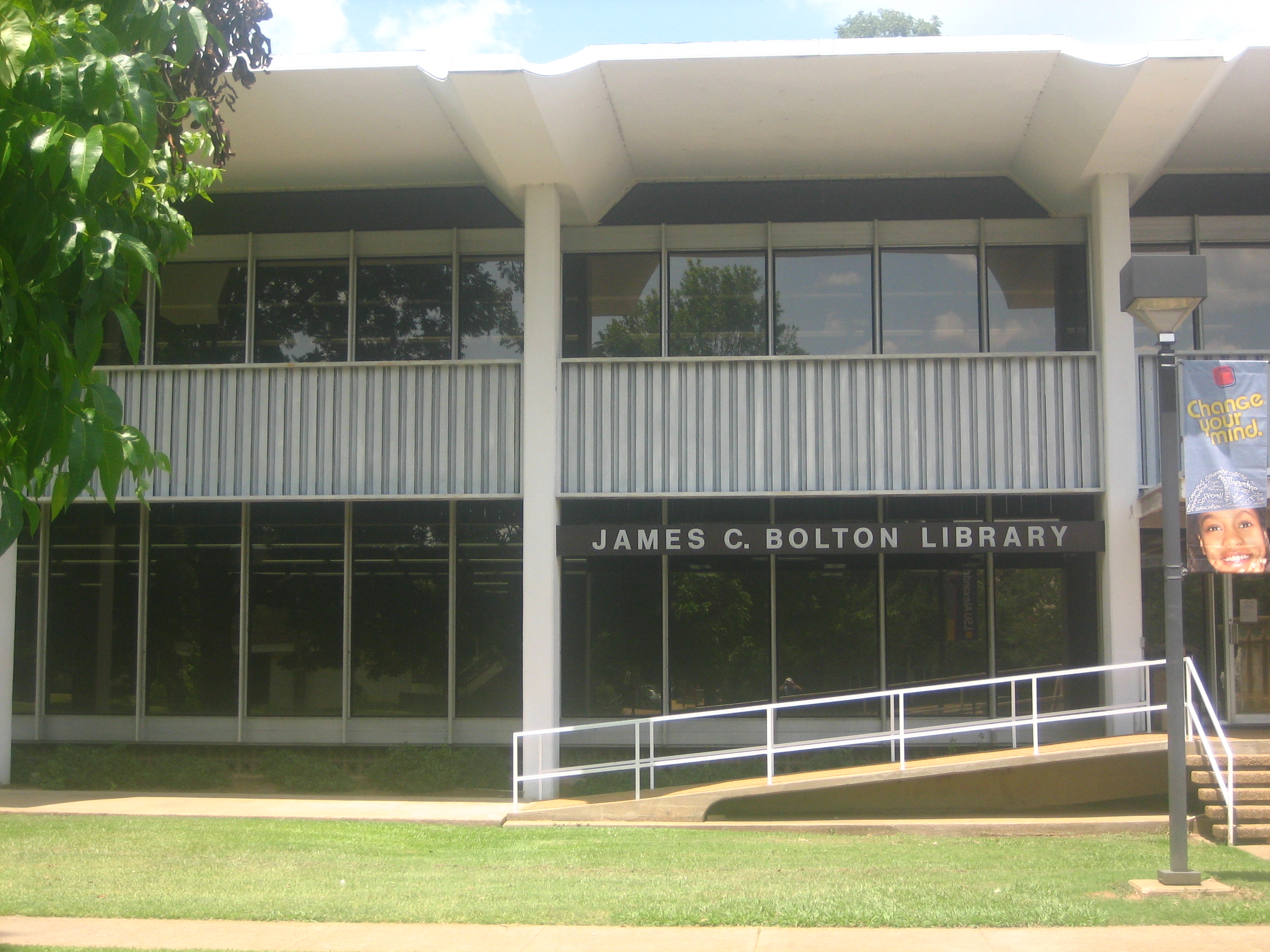
James C. Bolton Library

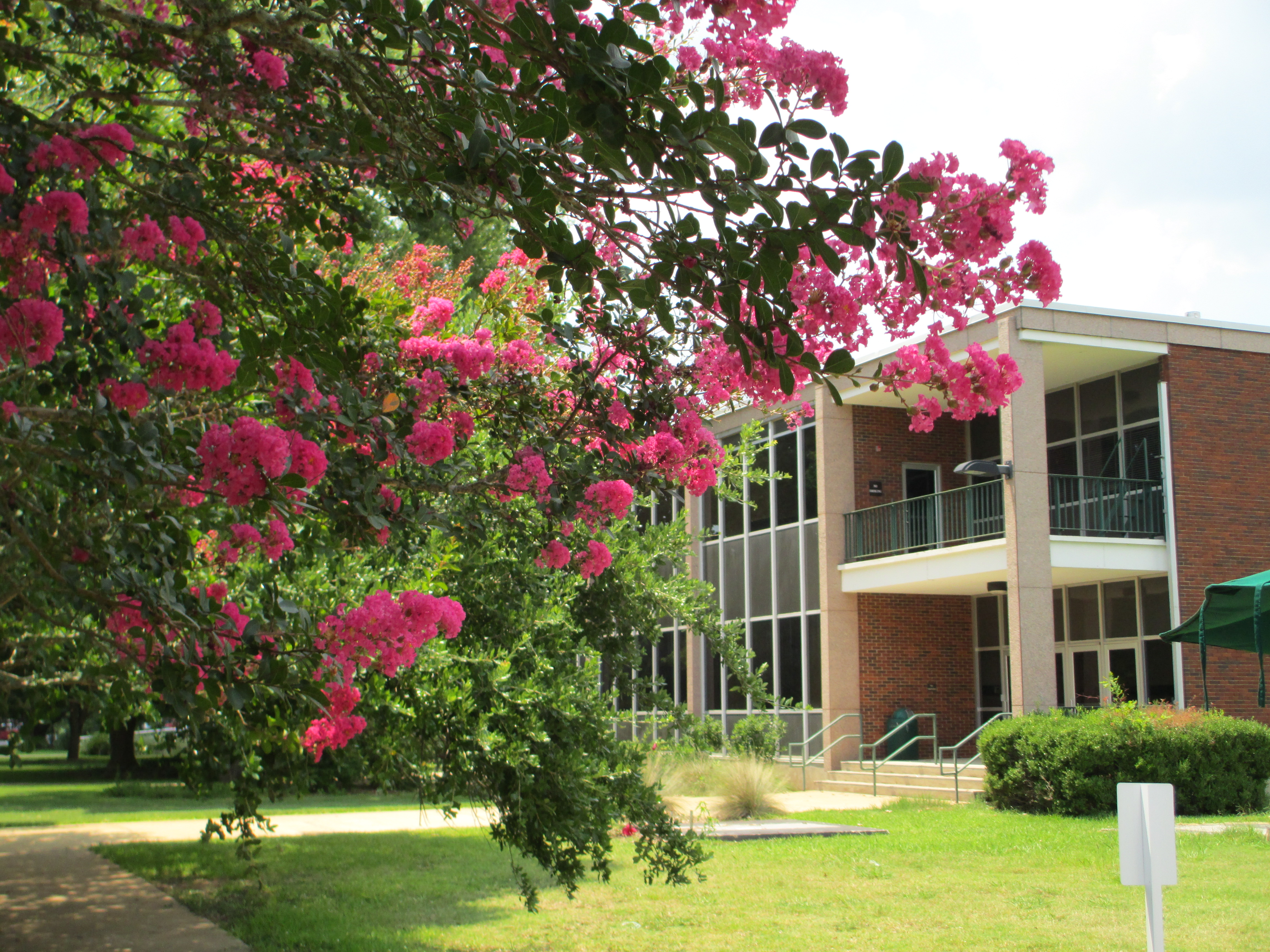
Crepe myrtle at the southeast corner of the Science Building

== Academics ==
Undergraduate demographics as of Fall 2023
Race and ethnicity	Total
White	58%
Black	20%
Unknown	13%
American Indian/Alaska Native	3%
Asian	3%
International student	2%
Hispanic	1%
Two or more races	1%
Economic diversity
Low-income (Note: The percentage of students who received an income-based federal Pell grant intended for low-income students.)	43%
Affluent (Note: The percentage of students who are a part of the American middle class at the bare minimum.)	57%

Academic rankings

Liberal arts
- U.S. News & World Report: RNP
- Washington Monthly: 240

LSUA devotes itself exclusively to undergraduate programs, offering degrees in a variety of liberal arts and professional disciplines. It confers Bachelor of Arts, Bachelor of Science, and Bachelor of General Studies (with a Concentration) degrees. LSUA also confers associate degrees in Nursing and Radiologic Technology. In addition, it offers Certification in Pharmacy Technology and an Alternative Path to Elementary and Secondary Education Certification.

== Athletics ==
The LSU–Alexandria (LSUA) athletic teams are called the Generals. The college is a member of the National Association of Intercollegiate Athletics (NAIA), primarily competing in the Red River Athletic Conference (RRAC) since the 2014–15 academic year. The Generals previously competed as an NAIA Independent within the Association of Independent Institutions (AII) from 2007–08 to 2013–14.

LSUA competes in seven intercollegiate varsity sports. Men's sports include baseball, basketball and soccer; while women's sports include basketball, soccer, softball and tennis. Club sports include cheerleading, flag football and e-sports.

=== Overview ===
LSUA hired its first athletic director in 2007 and began competing in NAIA men's baseball and women's fast-pitch softball in 2008. A new on-campus baseball and softball complex has been completed and is now the home of the Generals and Lady Generals ball teams. In 2013, the institution gained student support and approval by the LSU Board of Supervisors to add men's basketball and soccer and women's basketball, soccer, and tennis. Plans are for the college to compete in seven sports in 2014.
