= Samuel Bass (abolitionist) =

Canadian abolitionist (1807–1853)

Samuel Bass (August 1807 – August 30, 1853) was a Canadian construction worker and abolitionist who helped Solomon Northup, author of Twelve Years a Slave, attain his freedom. Northup was a free black man from New York who was kidnapped and forced into slavery in the Deep South. At risk of injury and conviction in default of the Fugitive Slave Act of 1850, Bass mailed letters to friends of Northup that initiated a series of events to save him.

== Canada ==
Bass was born in August 1807 in Augusta Township, Upper Canada (now Ontario), where he was raised. His parents were John and Hannah Lakins Bass, who had twelve children. John had come to Canada with his mother and siblings in the late 1770s after the death of his father. His grandparents, Adonijah and Lydia Draper Bass, were United Empire Loyalists who lived in Walloomsac, New York, during the American Revolutionary War.

Samuel Bass married Catharine Lydia Lane (or Lydia Catlin Lane), and they settled in rural Edwardsburgh Township. They built a house and had four daughters, Catherine, Hannah, Martha Maria, and Zeruah. He did not have a great relationship with his wife. He said that she had a temper so severe that it would have been difficult for any man to live with her.

== Louisiana ==
Bass left Canada around 1840 for the United States, where he had relatives. He is known to have lived in Louisiana, and he owned land in Illinois.

Bass came to Marksville, Louisiana, a town of about 6,000 people, by the 1850s. He was hired by John Waddill of Marksville to work on his home. They talked about his life in Canada, the details of which Waddill recorded in a diary. The town was located in Avoyelles Parish, which was "a region steeped in French-colonial history and surrounded by sweeping farmland, meandering bayous and moss-hanging shade trees." Bass freely expressed his concerns about slavery, which would not have been welcome in the Deep South. While others would have been run out of the area for their anti-slavery discourse, Bass stayed in the area because he was considered a respectful listener of other's viewpoints and was an interesting conversationalist.

=== Solomon Northup ===
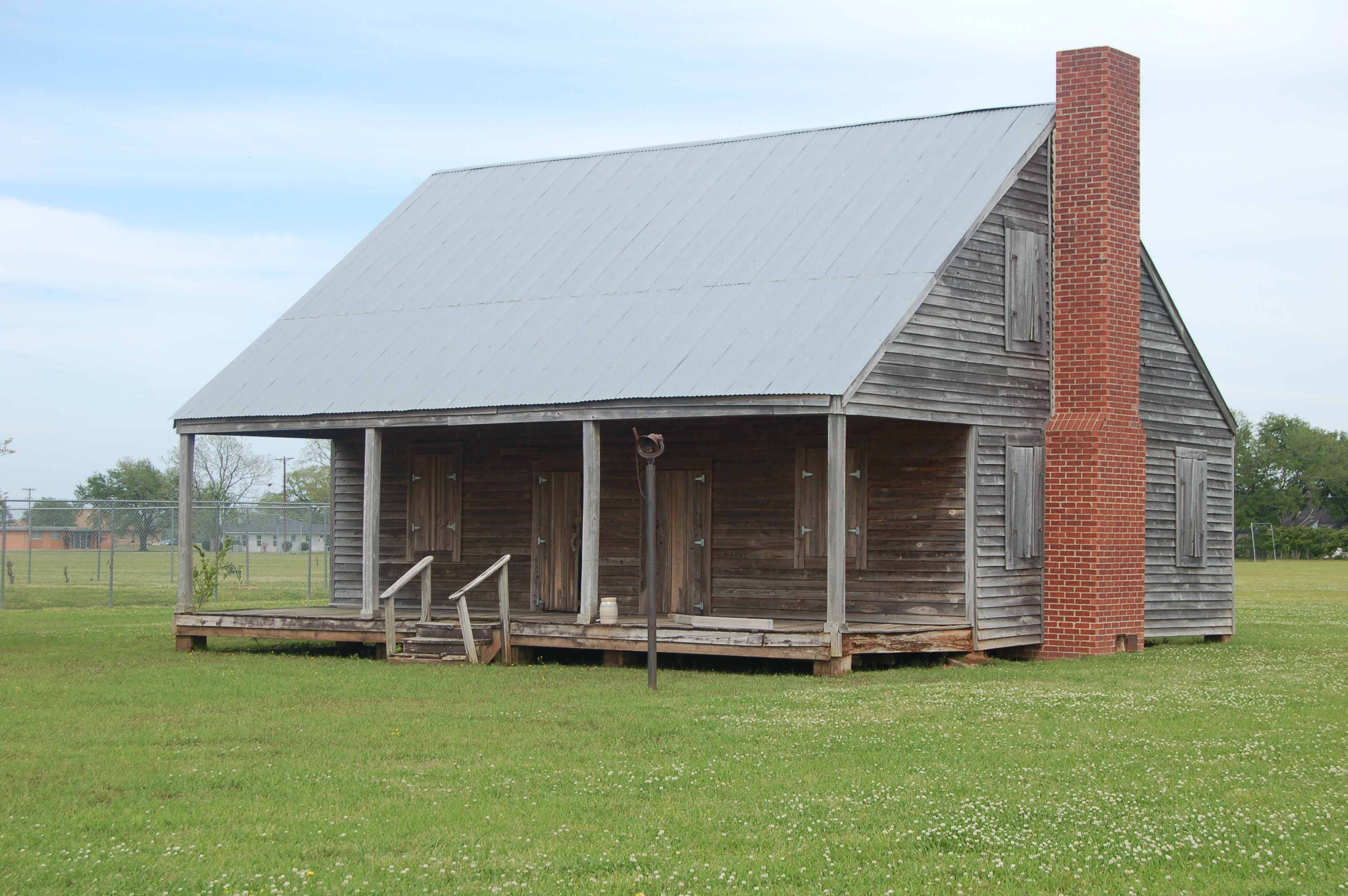
The Edwin Epps House, now located on the grounds of Louisiana State University, is a stop along Northup's Trail. Solomon Northup helped build the house that was completed in 1852.

Bass was hired in 1852 to build a new house, now called the Edwin Epps House for Edwin Epps's family. Bass and Solomon Northup, who was enslaved by Epps, worked together on the construction of a Creole cottage. By this time, Northup had been enslaved for eleven years, after being kidnapped and forced into slavery. Bass expressed his opposition to slavery with Epps. He said that there is "no justice or righteousness in it". Feeling comfortable with Bass, Northup shared his story and asked Bass to mail letters to his friends in New York. Bass agreed to help him, at great risk after the passage of the Fugitive Slave Act of 1850.

Remarking on Bass's bravery:

If you study history and understand how difficult it would've been to be an abolitionist in Avoyelles Parish in the 1850s, it makes me respect him that much more.

— Charles Riddle, Avoyelles Parish District Attorney

They met secretly on the plantation late at night in the summer of 1852 to make plans. They agreed that Bass should write the letters at his room at Marksville to avoid being caught. Northup provided the names of three individuals in Saratoga Springs, New York—Judge Marvin, Cephus Parker, and William Perry—who could vouch for his free status. They chose to write to three men, allowing that some people could have moved away or died. They figured that it might take six weeks for the letters to be received and for word to be sent back to Louisiana. To be safe, they agreed to avoid one another after the letters were sent.

There was no response to the three letters for months. Bass had decided on a backup plan to travel to Saratoga and deliver the message personally if needed. Bass and Northup were unaware of what was occurring in New York. Two of the letters were sent to Cephas Parker and William Perry from Saratoga, New York, who notified Northup's wife of her husband's whereabouts. Henry Bliss Northup, a lawyer and a relative of Northup's father's former slaveholder, was notified of his childhood friend's plight. With six affidavits and a petition, Henry Northup obtained a letter from Governor Washington Hunt of New York that declared that Solomon Northup was a free man and he appointed Henry an agent of rescue. Henry carried the letter with him as he traveled to Louisiana to meet with Waddill, who then wrote in an affidavit that Northup was "violently and fraudulently kidnapped." Waddill filed a lawsuit against Edwin Epps, after which Judge Ralph Cushman provided the paperwork for Epps to release Northup.

Henry arrived at the Epps' plantation on January 3, 1853, with the sheriff of Avoyelles Parish to free Northup. The New York Times published an article about Northup's years of slavery and emancipation, but Bass was not mentioned in the article. This may have been a means to protect him.

Among them was one to whom I owe an immeasurable debt of gratitude only for him in the all probability, I should have ended my days in slavery. He was my deliverer – a man whose true heart overflowed with noble and generous emotions. To the last moment of my existence, I should remember him with feelings of thankfulness. His name was Bass.

— Solomon Northup, Twelve Years a Slave

=== Final months ===
Bass lived in Marksville, where he had a relationship with a free woman of color, Augustine Tournier. Commonly called Justine, she had a daughter with Bass called both Ellen and Helena. Bass prepared a will with Waddill the night before he died of pneumonia on August 30, 1853 at the home of Justine Tournier. Bass had owned property in Illinois and Upper Canada, which he left to his children. He left what money he had to William Sloat, a friend, to arrange for a "decent Christian burial".

== Legacy and popular culture ==
- Bass was mentioned as a critical factor in Northup's freedom in a historic marker outside the courthouse in Marksville where Northup received his freedom papers.
- The restored Creole cottage that Bass and Northup built for Edwin Epps is located at the Louisiana State University of Alexandria campus, along the "Northup Trail" of key landmarks in Northup's life in Louisiana.
- Northup published his memoir, Twelve Years a Slave, in 1854.
- In 2013, the film Twelve Years a Slave was released. The movie won the Academy Award for Best Picture. Bass's part was played by Brad Pitt, who also produced the film.
