= Southern Oral History Program =

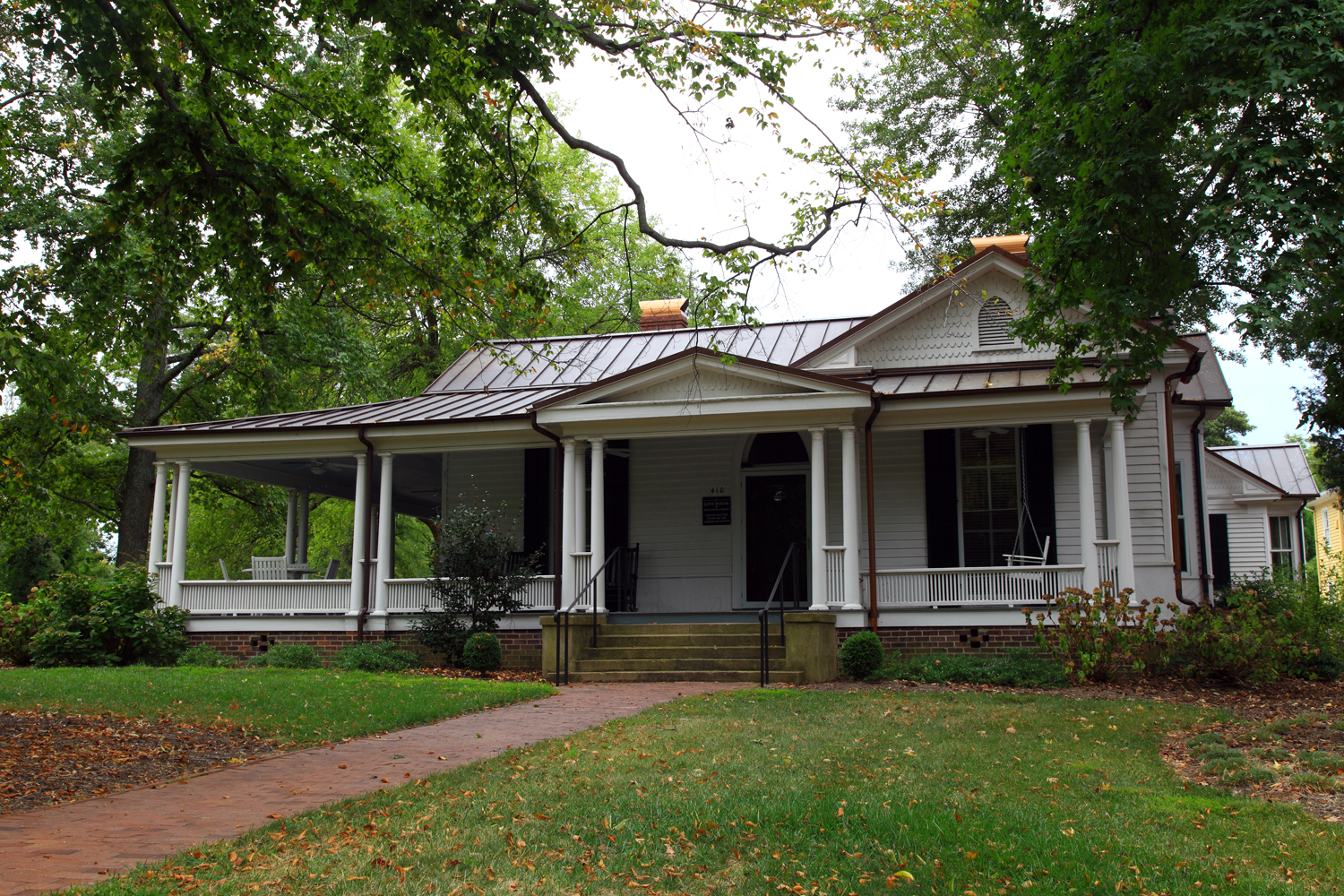
The Love House and Hutchins Forum, location of the Southern Oral History Program.

The Southern Oral History Program (SOHP), located in the Love House and Hutchins Forum in the historic district of Chapel Hill, North Carolina, is a research institution dedicated to collecting and preserving oral histories from across the southern United States.

== History ==
Founded in 1973 by Jacquelyn Dowd Hall and the History department of the University of North Carolina at Chapel Hill (UNC), the Southern Oral History Program is a part of UNC's Center for the Study of the American South. The SOHP is dedicated to the study of the American South as told by the many who lived, but often did not write, history. The SOHP has collected over 7,500 oral history interviews with southerners who have made important contributions to various fields, been involved in specific historical movements, or lived through times of southern transformation. Since its founding, the Program has grown to become one of the more prominent collections of oral histories in the United States and the world. Graduate students and faculty at UNC and the SOHP as well as independent researchers work to collect oral histories with the goal of "rendering historically visible those whose experience is not reflected in traditional written sources."

The SOHP is involved in many oral history outreach efforts, conducting workshops, aiding researchers interested in performing oral history interviews, and helping to promote the use of oral history in the classroom across North Carolina.

== Access ==
All oral histories are stored in the archives at the Southern Historical Collection in the Wilson Round Library at the University of North Carolina at Chapel Hill, and are freely available to the public. Many interviews have not only audio but also full transcripts, abstracts, biographical forms on the interviewees, and field notes from the interviewers. An interview database searchable by subject, project, interviewer, interviewee name, occupation, ethnicity, or interview number is available online. Traditionally, all oral histories have been accessible only on-site in the reading room of the Southern Historical Collection in Chapel Hill, N.C. However, a 2005 a grant-funded project, "Oral Histories of the American South" (OHAS), conducted by Documenting the American South began working to digitize 500 SOHP oral histories and provide online access to full audio, transcripts, and lesson plans for use of online oral histories in the classroom. Most of the collection has been digitized and is available online, and all new oral histories are now "born digital," created with digital audio recorders and other tools.

== Research ==
Since 2001, much of the SOHP's research effort has been focused on the initiative "The Long Civil Rights Movement: The South Since the 1960s," which documents the history and evolution of the Civil Rights Movement and other parallel movements in the South, such as the women's movement, but has also frequently turned to local stories of southern communities. These interviews focus on three main areas: race and the public schools, economic justice, and gender and sexuality. In 2008, the SOHP received a $937,000 grant from the Andrew W. Mellon Foundation to continue to collaborate in their efforts to produce civil rights movement scholarship. Since then, the SOHP has partnered with organizations such as the National Museum of African American History and Culture, the Smithsonian, the Library of Congress, and the NAACP Legal Defense and Educational Fund, Inc. to produce oral histories for their collections and engagement work.

== SOHP projects by series ==
Though the SOHP collects interviews from independent researchers across the South, most of the collection stems from field work conducted specifically by the SOHP. UNC faculty and students along with SOHP staff collect oral histories within the scope of specific interview series developed by the SOHP, listed below. Each series has a specific focus, and many contain sub-series.

- A. Southern Politics
- B. Individual Biographies
- C. Notable North Carolinians
- D. Rural Electrification
- E. Labor
- F. Fellowship of Southern Churchmen
- G. Southern Women
- H. Piedmont Industrialization
- I. Business History
- J. Legal Professions
- K. Southern Communities
- L. University of North Carolina
- M. Black High School Principals
- O. Foundation History: North Carolina Fund
- Q. African American Life and Culture
- R. Special Research Projects
- S. Center for Creative Leadership
- U. The Long Civil Rights Movement: The South Since the 1960s
- V. The Hayti Spectrum: Documenting Negro Life of the 1920s, '30s, and '40s in Durham, N.C.
- W. LGBTQ Life in the South
- X. Rural South
- Y. Stories to Save Lives
- Z. Polio
- AA. Pandemic at the Meadows: Carolina Meadows, 2020-2021
- BB. Masters of Our Own Domain: North Carolina's African American Farmers and Fishermen
- CC. North Carolina Occupational Safety and Health Project
- DD. North Carolina Community College Presidents of Color History Project

See the Southern Oral History Program Collection project list for descriptions of individual series and sub-series and use the Southern Oral History Program Interview Database to search and browse interviews and interview projects.
