= John Shelton Reed =

American sociologist (born 1942)

John Shelton Reed (born January 8, 1942) is an American sociologist and essayist, author or editor of 23 books, most of them dealing with the contemporary American South. Reed has also written for a variety of non-academic publications such as The Wall Street Journal, National Review, and Oxford American.

Reed was born in New York City on January 8, 1942. He was graduated from the Massachusetts Institute of Technology in 1964 and received his Ph.D. from Columbia University in 1971. He taught at the University of North Carolina at Chapel Hill from 1969 until his retirement, in 2000, as William Rand Kenan Jr. Professor of sociology and director of the Howard Odum Institute for Research in Social Science. He helped to found the Center for the Study of the American South and was a founding co-editor of the quarterly Southern Cultures.

Reed served as president of the Southern Sociological Society in 1988 to 1989 and the Southern Association for Public Opinion Research in 1999 to 2000. He was elected to the Fellowship of Southern Writers in 2000, and was chancellor of that organization from 2009 to 2011. He has lectured at over 300 colleges and universities in the United States and abroad and held visiting positions at over a dozen, including Fulbright lectureships in Israel and India, and the Pitt Professorship of American History and Institutions at Cambridge University.

After his retirement from the University of North Carolina, he held visiting positions at a number of institutions; among other things, he was a visiting fellow at All Souls College, Oxford University and a lieutenant colonel in the South Carolina Unorganized Militia while he was teaching at The Citadel, in Charleston. In 2023 he was presented the Order of the Long Leaf Pine by the governor of North Carolina.

Reed has been a Guggenheim Fellow, a Fellow of the National Humanities Center, and (twice) a Fellow of the Center for Advanced Study in the Behavioral Sciences. He holds honorary doctorates from the University of the South and the University of North Carolina at Wilmington, and is an Honorary Fellow of St Catharine's College, Cambridge.

Reed married Dale Volberg (1941 – 2018) in 1964. They wrote several books together. They have two daughters.

== Selected works ==
- The Enduring South: Subcultural Persistence in Mass Society (D. C. Heath, 1972; paperback ed., University of North Carolina Press, 1974; revised ed., 1986)
- The Enduring Effects of Education (with H. Hyman and C. Wright; University of Chicago Press, 1975)
- Perspectives on the American South: An Annual Review of Society, Politics and Culture (edited with M. Black; Gordon & Breach), vol. I, 1981; vol. II, 1983
- Regionalism and the South: Selected Papers of Rupert Vance (edited and with an introduction by J. S. Reed and D. J. Singal; University of North Carolina Press, 1982)
- One South: An Ethnic Approach to Regional Culture (Louisiana State University Press, 1982) ISBN 9780807110386
- Southerners: The Social Psychology of Sectionalism (University of North Carolina Press, 1983; Booksurge, 2008)
- Southern Folk, Plain and Fancy: Native White Social Types (University of Georgia Press, 1986)
- Whistling Dixie: Dispatches from the South (University of Missouri Press, 1990; paperback ed., Harcourt Brace, 1992) ISBN 9780156961745
- "My Tears Spoiled My Aim" and Other Reflections on Southern Culture (University of Missouri Press, 1993; paperback ed., Harcourt Brace, 1994) ISBN 9780156000062
- Surveying the South: Studies in Regional Sociology (University of Missouri Press, 1993) ISBN 9780826209153
- Kicking Back: Further Dispatches from the South (University of Missouri Press, 1995) ISBN 9780826210043
- 1001 Things Everyone Should Know about the South (with D. V. Reed; Doubleday, 1996) ISBN 9780385474412
- Glorious Battle: The Cultural Politics of Victorian Anglo-Catholicism (Vanderbilt University Press, 1996; U.K. ed. Tufton Press, 1998) ISBN 9781548865184
- Minding the South (University of Missouri Press, 2003) ISBN 9781412852524
- Townways of Kent, by Ralph Patrick (edited and with a new introduction by J. S. Reed and D. V. Reed; University of South Carolina Press, 2008) ISBN 9781570037276
- Cornbread Nation 4: The Best of Southern Food Writing (edited with D. V. Reed; University of Georgia Press, 2008) ISBN 9780820330891
- Holy Smoke: The Big Book of North Carolina Barbecue (with D. V. Reed and W. McKinney; University of North Carolina Press, 2008) ISBN 9781469629667
- Dixie Bohemia: A French Quarter Circle in the 1920s (Louisiana State University Press, 2012)
- Barbecue: A Savor the South Cookbook (University of North Carolina Press, 2016) ISBN 9781469626703
- Leftovers (Bozart Books, 2018) ISBN 9781720436096
- Mixing It Up: A South-Watcher's Miscellany (Louisiana State University Press, 2018) ISBN 9780807169575
- On Barbecue (University of Tennessee Press, 2021) ISBN 9781621906384
- The Ramos Gin Fizz (Iconic New Orleans Cocktails) (2025) ISBN 9780807183526

== Sources ==
- Joseph Flora et al., Southern Writers: A New Biographical Dictionary (LSU 2006), p. 337
- Southern Cultures Special Issue, "The South According to Reed", Spring 2001
- Personal webpage
