= Center for the Study of the American South =

Academic organization

Coordinates: 35.9158°N 79.0482°W

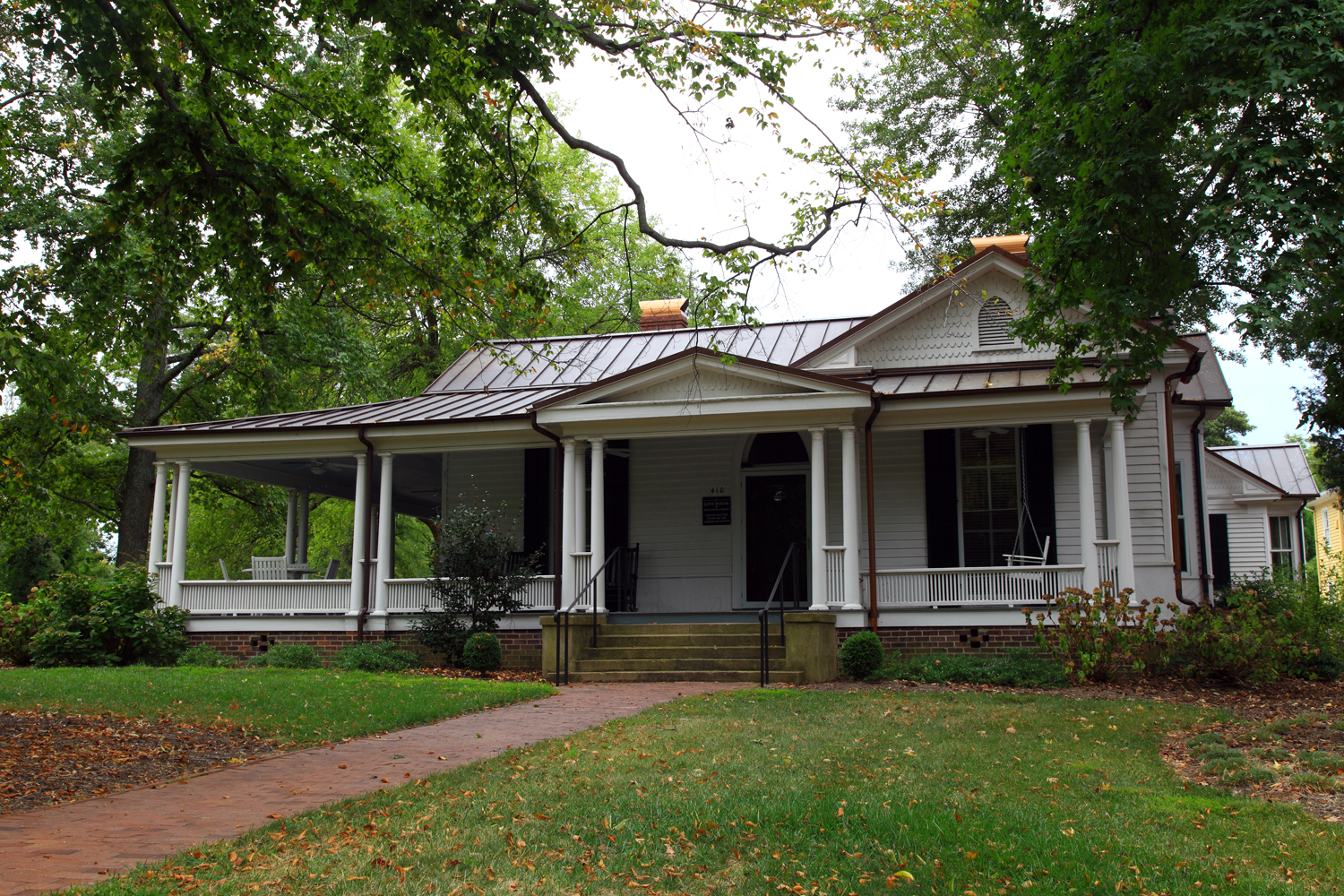
- Established: 1992
- Director: Malinda Maynor Lowery
- Location: 410 East Franklin Street; University of North Carolina; Chapel Hill, North Carolina, U.S.
- Website: south.unc.edu

The Center for the Study of the American South (CSAS) is an academic organization dedicated to the study of "southern history, literature, and culture as well as ongoing social, political, and economic issues" at the University of North Carolina at Chapel Hill.

== History ==
The CSAS was the brainchild of a working group of faculty at UNC's Institute for Research in Social Science, a group that included IRSS director John Shelton Reed (William Rand Kenan Jr. Professor of Sociology at UNC), anthropologist James Peacock, and David Moltke-Hansen (curator of the Southern Historical Collection at UNC's Wilson Library). This group recognized the value of an umbrella organization that could help faculty and students studying the South to communicate, collaborate, and combine resources. They presented their idea to the UNC Board of Governors, which established the CSAS in 1992 with Reed as acting director, until he was succeeded by Moltke-Hansen. Malinda Maynor Lowery, professor of history at UNC, served as director from 2017 to 2021, before departing for Emory University. A search is underway for a new director.

== Mission statement ==
The stated mission of the CSAS is

to extend the historic role of the University of North Carolina at Chapel Hill as the world's premier institution for research, teaching, and public dialogue on the history, culture, and contemporary experience of the American South. The Center is the University's primary vehicle to promote initiatives in this tradition of regional service and scholarship.

== Primary activities ==
The primary focus of the CSAS is supporting inter-departmental research within UNC and disseminating the results. The Center funds and promotes many activities, including the publication of the quarterly journal Southern Cultures (ISSN 1068-8218), edited originally by Reed and Watson, now edited by Watson and Jocelyn Neal, associate professor in UNC's Department of Music.

== Research ==
Over 60 UNC faculty members are associated with the CSAS, from disciplines including African American Studies, American Studies, Anthropology, Archeology, Creative Writing, English Studies, Folklore, Geography, History, Music, Political Science, Religious Studies, and Sociology. Examples include Philip F. Gura (American Studies), who studies banjo music in the nineteenth century, and Jocelyn R. Neal (Music), who studies country music and dance. John Herbert Roper has also written several articles for the center.

In addition, the CSAS hosts professors from outside universities, including Timothy McCarthy from Harvard University, and Norio Hirose from the School of Law at Kwansei Gakuin University in Nishinomiya, providing them with complete access to UNC's resources and professors to aid in collaborative research.

== Public awareness ==
The CSAS also houses and supports the Program for Public Life, a group dedicated to raising public awareness of political issues in the South, and the Southern Oral History Program.
