= Dixie Bohemia =

Book by John Shelton Reed

Dixie Bohemia: A French Quarter Circle in the 1920s is a 2012 book by John Shelton Reed, published by Louisiana State University Press.

The book explains how New Orleans fostered Bohemianism in that time period.

== Background ==
Reed had given lectures, in series #71, of the Walter Lynwood Fleming Lectures in Southern History in 2011, and used them as the basis of this book. The lectures in turn discussed Sherwood Anderson and Other Famous Creoles: A Gallery of Contemporary New Orleans by William Faulkner and William Spratling.

== Content ==
The start of the work gives introductions to various personalities of the era.

Content from Sherwood Anderson and Other Famous Creoles makes up the latter portion of the work.

== Reception ==
Alecia P. Long of Louisiana State University wrote that the work is "fine and witty", "a rich window" into the subject, and that its introductions of people were "brief but witty". Long concluded that the work is "a reliable, wonderfully written, and sometimes laugh-out-loud assessment".

James D. Wright of the University of Central Florida wrote that the work overall is "an enticing glimpse of" the subject, and that the latter portion of the book is "a fine piece of network analysis, albeit without the mathematics."
