= John Herbert Roper =

American historian (born 1948)

- Born: August 9, 1948 (age 78); South Carolina, U.S.
- Education: University of South Carolina (BA); University of North Carolina (MA, PhD); North Carolina State University (MS)
- Occupation: Historian

John Herbert Roper Sr. (born August 9, 1948) is an American historian. The University of North Carolina has a collection of his papers.

He was born in South Carolina. He graduated from the University of South Carolina with a B.A., received an M.A. and a Ph.D. from the University of North Carolina, and an M.S. in economics from North Carolina State University.

He is an emeritus history department chair and former Richardson Professor of American History at Emory & Henry College in Emory, Virginia. He now teaches at Coastal Carolina University. He wrote books on Southern history and several biographies, on C. Vann Woodward, Ulrich Bonnell Phillips, Paul Green, William Jennings Bryan Dorn, and Benjamin Mays.

He has written several articles for Southern Cultures.

== Books ==
- U. B. Phillips: A Southern Mind (1984)
- C. Vann Woodward, Southerner (1987)
- Paul Green's War Songs (1993)
- C. Vann Woodward; A Southern Historian and His Critics (1997)
- Paul Green, Playwright of the Real South (2003)
- The Magnificent Mays: A Biography of Benjamin Elijah Mays (2012)
- The Last Orator for the Millhands: William Jennings Bryan Dorn, 1916-2005 (2019)
