= Kenneth M. Stampp =

American historian (1912–2009)

Kenneth Milton Stampp
- Born: July 20, 1912; Milwaukee, Wisconsin U.S.
- Died: July 10, 2009 (aged 96); Oakland, California U.S.
- Known for: Slavery, American Civil War, Reconstruction

Academic background
- Education: University of Wisconsin, Madison; Milwaukee State Teachers' College

Kenneth Milton Stampp (12 July 1912 – 10 July 2009) was an historian of slavery, the American Civil War, and Reconstruction. He taught at the University of California, Berkeley, from 1946 to 1983, ending his career there as the Alexander F. and May T. Morrison Professor of History Emeritus. He was also a visiting professor at Harvard University and Colgate University, Commonwealth Lecturer at the University of London, Fulbright Lecturer at LMU Munich, and held the Harmsworth Chair at Oxford University.

In 1989 Stampp received the American Historical Association Award for Scholarly Distinction. In 1993, he won the prestigious Lincoln Prize for lifetime achievement given by the Civil War Institute at Gettysburg College.

== Life and career ==
Stampp was born in Milwaukee, Wisconsin, in 1912; his parents were of German Protestant descent. His mother was a Baptist who forbade alcohol and strictly observed the Sabbath; his father was a tough disciplinarian in the old-world German style.

His family suffered through the Great Depression; "there was never enough money," but Stampp worked at small odd jobs as a teen, managing to save enough to afford tuition. He first attended the Milwaukee State Teachers' College, and then the University of Wisconsin, Madison. He earned both his B.A. and M.A. there in 1935 and 1936 respectively under the influences of Charles A. Beard (author of An Economic Interpretation of the Constitution of the United States) and William B. Hesseltine (known for coining the phrase about intellectual history: it's "like nailing jelly to the wall"). Hesseltine supervised Stampp's dissertation; Stampp remembered him as a "bastard" during this time, but the two managed to work together successfully through the completion of Stampp's Ph.D. in 1942.

While a student at Wisconsin, Stampp was a member of the Theta Xi fraternity.

Stampp then spent brief stints at the University of Arkansas and the University of Maryland, College Park, 1942–46, before joining the faculty at Berkeley. His teaching tenure ran 37 years; in 2006, Stampp celebrated six decades of association there.

Stampp died at age 96 on July 10, 2009, in Oakland, California.

=== The Peculiar Institution ===
In his first major book, The Peculiar Institution: Slavery in the Ante-Bellum South (1956), Stampp countered the arguments of historians such as Ulrich Phillips, who characterized slavery as an essentially benign and paternalistic institution that promoted Southern racial harmony. Stampp asserted, to the contrary, that African Americans actively resisted slavery, not just through armed uprisings but also through work slowdowns, the breaking of tools, theft from masters, and diverse other means. Through a lengthy scholarly career, Stampp insisted that the moral debate over slavery lay at the crux of the Civil War, rather than other reasons related to the economic or political relationship between the Federal Government and the states. The Peculiar Institution is a central text in the study of U.S. slavery.

=== Criticism of the Dunning School ===
His next study, The Era of Reconstruction, 1865-1877, also revised a scholarly stronghold – that put forth by William A. Dunning (1857–1922) and his school of followers. In this rendering, the South emerges mercilessly beaten, "prostrate in defeat, before a ruthless, vindictive conqueror, who plundered its land and ... turned its society upside down...." The North's greatest sin, according to Dunning, consisted of relinquishing control of the Southern governments to "ignorant, half-civilized former slaves."

To refute Dunning's interpretation, Stampp presented a trove of secondary sources. He was criticized for not employing more primary material. Stampp's rejoinder was seen by some historians as a pro-Northern rationalization: though he clearly admitted that the North walked out on Reconstruction while it was nowhere near completion, he went on to claim that in light of the passage of the 14th and 15th amendments, Reconstruction was a success; he deemed it "the last great crusade of the nineteenth-century romantic reformers." But for an equal number of other historians, Stampp's appraisal rang as eminently "temperate, judicious and fair-minded."

== Major monographs ==
- Indiana Politics During the Civil War (1949) [revised dissertation]
- And the War Came: The North and the Secession Crisis, 1860-1861 (1950)
- The Peculiar Institution: Slavery in the Ante-Bellum South, Knopf (1956); Vintage (1989) ISBN 0-679-72307-2
- The Causes of the Civil War (1959) editor
- Andrew Johnson and the Failure of the Agrarian Dream (1962)
- The Era of Reconstruction, 1865-1877, Knopf (1965); Vintage (1967) ISBN 0-394-70388-X
- The Southern Road to Appomattox (1969)
- Reconstruction: An Anthology of Revisionist Writings (1969) co-editor
- The Imperiled Union: Essays on the Background of the Civil War (1980)
- America in 1857: A Nation on the Brink (1990)
- The United States and National Self-Determination: Two Traditions (1991)
