= Lois Horton =

American historian (1942–2021)

Lois E. Horton (September 27, 1942 – September 22, 2021) was an American historian, specializing in African American history. She co-authored numerous foundational studies of nineteenth-century African American history and abolitionism.

== Career ==
She received her Ph.D. from Brandeis University in 1977. She was especially well known for her work on antebellum Black history and abolitionism. Much of her work was co-authored with the eminent historian James Oliver Horton, who also was her husband. Together, the Hortons published some of the foundational work on nineteenth-century African American history, contributing to historians' understanding of U.S. history.

She was professor emeritus of history at George Mason University. Before her retirement, she held the Distinguished John Adams Chair in American History at George Mason, and visited the University of Amsterdam as a Fulbright scholar.

== Bibliography ==
- Harriet Tubman and the Fight for Freedom: A Brief History with Documents Revolutionary Backlash: Women and Politics in the Early American Republic
- Slavery and the Making of America with James Oliver Horton. Companion to 2005 PBS series.
- ed. Slavery and Public History: The Tough Stuff of American Memory with James Oliver Horton
- Slavery & the Law
- Hard Road to Freedom: The Story of African America with James Oliver Horton
- In Hope of Liberty: Culture, Community and Protest Among Northern Free Blacks, 1700-1860 with James Oliver Horton. 1996.
- History of the African American People: The History, Traditions and Culture of African Americans
