= Peter Kolchin =

American historian (1943–2025)

- Born: Peter Robert Kolchin; June 3, 1943; Washington, D.C., U.S.
- Died: January 13, 2025 (aged 81)
- Education: Columbia University (AB); Johns Hopkins University (PhD)
- Occupation: Historian
- Awards: Bancroft Prize (1988)

Peter Robert Kolchin (June 3, 1943 – January 13, 2025) was an American historian. He specialized in slavery and labor in the American South before and after the Civil War, and in comparisons with Russian serfdom and other forms of labor. Kolchin won the Bancroft Prize in American History and the Avery O. Craven Award for his book Unfree Labor: American Slavery and Russian Serfdom (1987).

== Life and career ==
Born in Washington, D.C., Kolchin attended local schools. He graduated from Columbia University with an A.B. in 1964, and conducted graduate work at Johns Hopkins University, where he received a Ph.D. in 1970. His doctoral thesis was entitled: "First Freedom: The Responses of Alabama's Blacks to Emancipation and Reconstruction".

Kolchin was a professor at the University of Delaware.

Kolchin died on January 13, 2025, at the age of 81.

== Awards ==
- 1988 Bancroft Prize in American History
- 1988 Avery O. Craven Award from the Organization of American Historians
- Charles Sydnor Award, Southern Historical Association

== Works ==
- First Freedom: The Responses of Alabama's Blacks to Emancipation and Reconstruction. University of Alabama Press. 1972. (Revised ed. 2008). ISBN 978-0-8173-5535-7
- Unfree Labor: American Slavery and Russian Serfdom. Harvard University Press. 1987. ISBN 978-0-674-92098-9.
- Frank McGlynn; Seymour Drescher, eds. (1992). "The Tragic Era? Interpreting Southern Reconstruction in Comparative Perspective". The Meaning of freedom: economics, politics, and culture after slavery. University of Pittsburgh Press. ISBN 978-0-8229-5479-8.
- American Slavery, 1619-1877 (1993, revised ed. 2003) ISBN 978-0-14-024150-1
- Helen Saltz Jacobson, ed. (2002). "Foreword". Up from Serfdom: My Childhood and Youth in Russia, 1804-1824. Translator Helen Saltz Jacobson. Yale University Press. ISBN 978-0-300-09716-0.
- A Sphinx on the American Land: The Nineteenth-Century South in Comparative Perspective. LSU Press. 2003. ISBN 978-0-8071-2866-4.
