= James Oliver Horton =

American historian (1943–2017)

James Oliver Horton (March 28, 1943 – February 20, 2017) was a professor of history specializing in African American history. He published ten books on the subject, as well as undertaking several public history projects about Black history.

He consulted on various film and video productions. His wife Lois E. Horton collaborated with him on various projects.

== Selected works ==
- Black Bostonians (Holmes & Meier, 1979)
- Free People of Color (Smithsonian Institution Press, 1993)
- In Hope of Liberty: Culture, Protest, Community among Northern Free Blacks, 1700-1860 (Oxford University Press, 1998)
- Hard Road to Freedom (Rutgers University Press, 2001)
- Slavery and the Making of America (Oxford University Press, 2004)
- The Landmarks of African American History (Oxford University Press, 2005) ISBN 9780195141184
- Slavery and Public History; The Tough Stuff of American Memory (The New Press, 2006)
