= The Peculiar Institution =

1956 book by Kenneth M. Stampp

- First edition
- Author: Kenneth M. Stampp
- Language: English
- Genre: Non-fiction
- Publisher: Vintage Books
- Publication date: 1956
- Publication place: United States

The Peculiar Institution: Slavery in the Ante-Bellum South is a non-fiction book about slavery in the United States published in 1956, by Kenneth M. Stampp of the University of California, Berkeley, and other universities. The book describes and analyzes multiple facets of slavery in the American South from the 17th through the mid-19th century, including demographics, lives of slaves and slaveholders, the Southern economy and labor systems, the Northern and abolitionist response, slave trading, and political issues of the time.

Stampp answers historians such as Ulrich Phillips, who said that many Southern slave owners were kind to their slaves and provided well for them. While it was sometimes known for slaves to have lives as good as or better than those of poor Northern workers, Stampp exposes this behavior as a selfish strategy to ease the lives of some slaves in order to prevent dissent among the rest, or to prevent possible legal action for mistreatment of slaves. Stampp argues that this treatment did little to convince slaves that their lives were acceptable, and that dissent and opposition were common, making slaves "a troublesome property", as they were called at the time.

The use of the expression "peculiar institution" to refer to Southern slavery began in 1830 with leading Southern politician John C. Calhoun, and became widespread.

== Key points ==
Stampp's intent is to answer prior historians who had characterized slavery as a mostly benign, paternalistic tradition, helpful in many ways to the slaves, that encouraged racial harmony in the Southern states. Stampp also condemns those who claim that "to the Negroes, slavery seemed natural; knowing no other life, they accepted it without giving the matter much thought. Not that slavery was a good thing, mind you—but still, it probably hurt the Negroes less than it did the whites. Indeed, the whites were really more enslaved than were the Negro slaves" (429). Stampp likens this claim to pro-slavery arguments before the Civil War, which were "based on some obscure and baffling logic" (429).

Stampp held that the national debate over the morality of slavery, rather than states' rights, was the focal point of the U.S. Civil War. Stampp wrote, "Prior to the Civil War southern slavery was America's most profound and vexatious social problem. More than any other problem, slavery nagged at the public conscience; offering no easy solution...." (vii). The book was for Stampp not only about 19th-century history but a necessary examination for Americans in the 1950s, because "it is an article of faith that knowledge of the past is a key to understanding the present", and "one must know what slavery meant to the Negro and how he reacted to it before one can comprehend his more recent tribulations" (vii). The Peculiar Institution remains a central text in the study of U.S. slavery.

== Chapters ==
- I. "The Setting" - background and demographics in the Old South.
- II. "From Day Clean to First Dark" - slaves' toilsome daily lives; slavery within southern labor systems.
- III. "A Troublesome Property" - defiance of slaves; Stampp asserts that African-American slaves actively resisted slavery, not just through uprisings and escape, but also through work slowdowns, feigning illness, damaging plantation machinery and work implements, theft, and other means. He lauds these actions as honorable resistance by slaves, which could be used as models by other oppressed groups, not least black Americans in the 1950s.
- IV. "To Make Them Stand in Fear" -disciplinary practices and submission; slave feelings of inferiority; fear and dependence in slave life; religion; incentives offered to slaves; power structures; cruelty of slaveowners and overseers.
- V. "Chattels Personal" - conflicts in racial classifications; slave laws and codes; limited freedoms for slaves.
- VI. "Slavemongering" - slave movement and sales; African slave trade prior to the nineteenth century; separation of slave families.
- VII. "Maintenance, Morbidity and Mortality" - slave food, clothing, housing and sickness.
- VIII. "Between Two Cultures" - class and caste systems; personal relationships of slaves and masters; social positions; sex, family, religion, leisure.
- IX. "Profit and Loss" - slave value; economic gains and losses through slavery; slavery in the economic system; agrarian vs. industrial development in the Old South; land exhaustion in the Old South.
- X. "He Who Has Endured" - moral ambiguity of slaveowners; the desperate defense of slavery; destructive effects of slavery on free labor, non-slaveowners and white yeomen in the Old South; intellectual torpor in the South due to rigid pro-slavery positions.

== Use by Martin Luther King Jr. ==
In Where Do We Go from Here: Chaos or Community? (1967), author Martin Luther King Jr. quotes extensively from The Peculiar Institution. King describes Stampp's "fascinating" depiction of "the psychological indoctrination that was necessary from the master's viewpoint to make a good slave".
