= 12 Years a Slave (film) =

2013 film directed by Steve McQueen

- Theatrical release poster
- Directed by: Steve McQueen
- Screenplay by: John Ridley
- Based on: Twelve Years a Slave by Solomon Northup
- Produced by: Brad Pitt; Dede Gardner; Jeremy Kleiner; Bill Pohlad; Steve McQueen; Arnon Milchan; Anthony Katagas
- Starring: Chiwetel Ejiofor; Michael Fassbender; Benedict Cumberbatch; Paul Dano; Paul Giamatti; Lupita Nyong'o; Sarah Paulson; Brad Pitt; Alfre Woodard
- Cinematography: Sean Bobbitt
- Edited by: Joe Walker
- Music by: Hans Zimmer
- Production companies: Regency Enterprises; River Road Entertainment; Plan B Entertainment; Film4
- Distributed by: Fox Searchlight Pictures (United States); Entertainment One (United Kingdom); Summit Entertainment (Overseas)
- Release dates: August 30, 2013 (Telluride Film Festival); November 8, 2013 (United States); January 10, 2014 (United Kingdom)
- Running time: 134 minutes
- Countries: United States; United Kingdom; Luxembourg
- Language: English
- Budget: $20–22 million
- Box office: $187.7 million

12 Years a Slave is a 2013 biographical historical drama film directed by Steve McQueen from a screenplay by John Ridley, based on the 1853 slave memoir Twelve Years a Slave by Solomon Northup, a Black American, who was kidnapped from Washington, D.C. by two conmen in 1841 and sold into slavery. He was put to work on plantations in the state of Louisiana for 12 years before being released. The first scholarly edition of David Wilson's version of Northup's story was co-edited in 1968 by Sue Eakin and Joseph Logsdon.

In the film, Chiwetel Ejiofor stars as Solomon Northup. Supporting roles are portrayed by Michael Fassbender, Benedict Cumberbatch, Paul Dano, Garret Dillahunt, Paul Giamatti, Scoot McNairy, Lupita Nyong'o, Adepero Oduye, Sarah Paulson, Brad Pitt, Michael Kenneth Williams, and Alfre Woodard. Principal photography took place in New Orleans, Louisiana, from June 27 to August 13, 2012. The locations used were four historic antebellum plantations: Felicity, Bocage, Destrehan, and Magnolia. Of the four, Magnolia is nearest to the actual plantation where Northup was held.

12 Years a Slave received widespread critical acclaim and was named the best film of 2013 by several media outlets and critics. It earned over $187 million on a production budget of $22 million. The film received nine Academy Award nominations, winning for Best Picture, Best Adapted Screenplay for Ridley, and Best Supporting Actress for Nyong'o. The Best Picture win made McQueen the first Black producer to ever receive the award and the first Black director of a Best Picture winner. The film was awarded the Golden Globe Award for Best Motion Picture – Drama, and the British Academy of Film and Television Arts recognized it with the BAFTA Awards for Best Film and Best Actor for Ejiofor. Since its release, the film has been cited as among the best of the 2010s, the 21st century, and of all time, with it being named the 44th greatest film since 2000 in a BBC poll of 177 critics in 2016 and the 51st best film of the 21st century in a New York Times poll of over 500 filmmakers in 2025.

In 2023, the film was selected for preservation in the United States National Film Registry by the Library of Congress as being "culturally, historically or aesthetically significant", making it the ninth film designated in its first year of eligibility and the 49th Best Picture Academy Award winner to be inducted.

== Plot ==
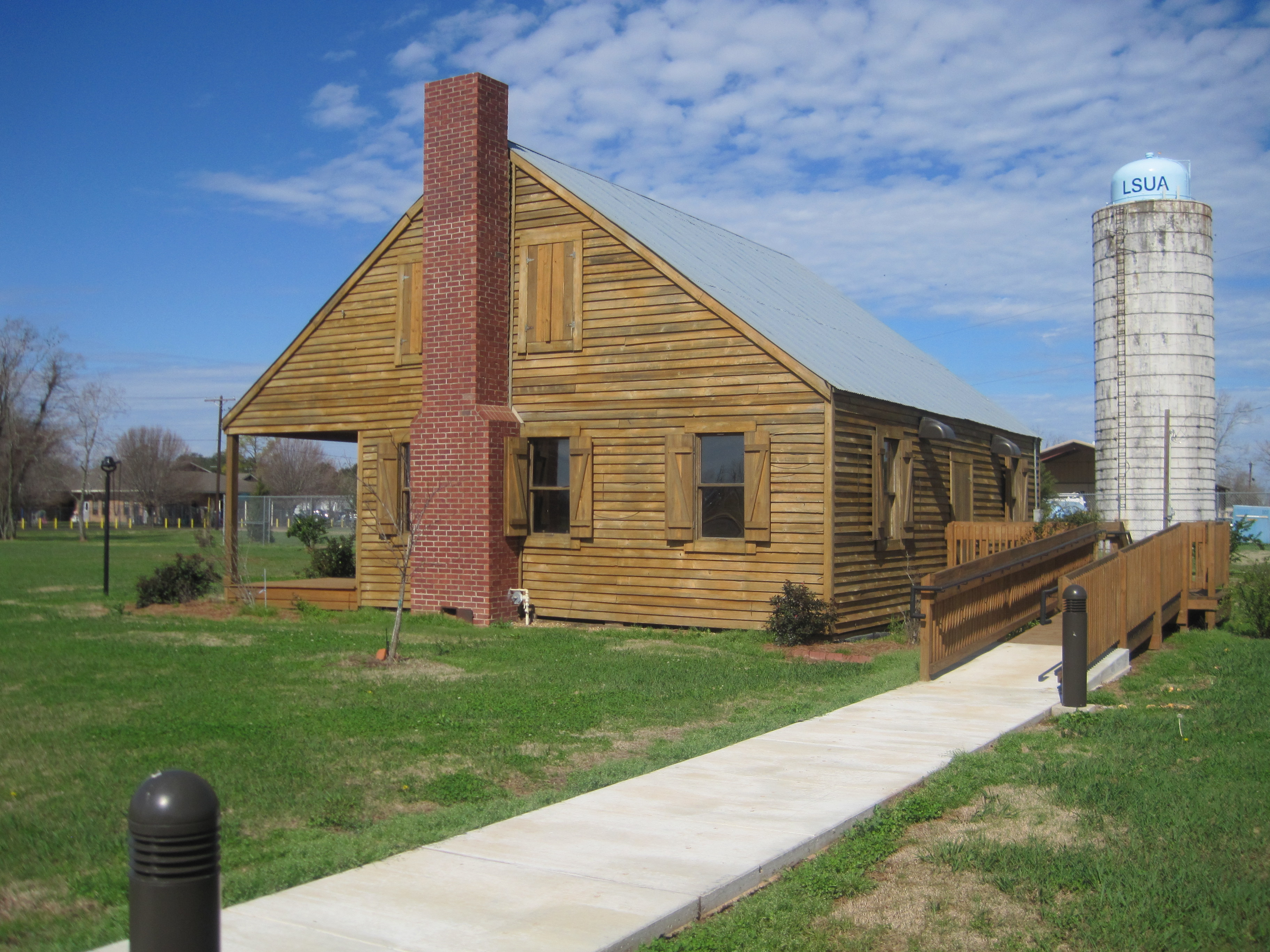
The Edwin Epps House, now located on the ground of Louisiana State University of Alexandria, is a stop along Northup's Trail. Solomon Northup and Samuel Bass helped build the house that was completed in 1852.

Solomon Northup is a free African-American man in 1841, working as a violinist and living with his wife and two children in Saratoga Springs, New York. Two white men, Brown and Hamilton, offer him short-term employment as a musician in Washington, D.C.; instead, they drug him and deliver him to James H. Birch, the owner of a slave pen. Northup proclaims his freedom, only to be violently beaten and tortured.

He is shipped to New Orleans with other slaves, who tell him he must adapt to survive in the South. Slave trader, Theophilus Freeman gives Northup the identity of "Platt," a runaway slave from Georgia, and sells him to plantation owner William Ford. Ford takes a liking to Northup and gives him a violin. Tensions between Northup and plantation carpenter John Tibeats break when Northup defends himself from Tibeats and beats him with his whip. Tibeats and his men prepare to lynch Northup but are stopped by the overseer. Northup is left on tiptoes with the noose around his neck for hours before Ford arrives and cuts him down. Northup tells Ford that he is, in fact, a free man, but Ford has debts to settle and sells him to plantation owner Edwin Epps.

Epps is abusive and sadistic to his slaves. Northup meets Patsey, a favored slave and Epps's top cotton picker. Epps regularly rapes Patsey, and his jealous wife abuses her. Cotton worms destroy Epps's crops, so he leases his slaves to neighbor Judge Turner's plantation for the season. Turner favors Northup and allows him to fiddle at a celebration and keep his earnings. Northup returns to Epps and pays white field hand and former overseer Armsby to mail a letter to his friends in New York. Armsby takes the money but betrays him. Epps questions and threatens Northup, who convinces him that Armsby is lying. Northup burns the letter. Patsey is caught by Epps going to a neighboring plantation to acquire soap, as Mrs. Epps will not let her have any. Epps orders Northup to whip Patsey, which he reluctantly does. Epps demands he strike her harder, eventually taking the whip and beating Patsey nearly to death. Enraged over his actions, Northup destroys his violin.

He begins constructing a gazebo with Canadian laborer Samuel Bass. Bass, citing his Christian faith, strongly opposes slavery and castigates Epps. Northup reveals his kidnapping to Bass and asks for his help in sending a letter. The local sheriff arrives, and Northup recognizes his companion as Mr. Parker, a shopkeeper he knew in New York. As they embrace, Epps tries to prevent Northup from leaving, but is rebuffed. Northup bids farewell to Patsey and rides off to his freedom.

Northup returns home to reunite with his wife and children. His daughter, who is now married, introduces his grandson and namesake, Solomon Northup Staunton. He apologises for his appearance, having had "a difficult time", and weeps as his family comforts him.

An epilogue recounts Northup's unsuccessful lawsuits against Brown, Hamilton, and Birch; the 1853 publication of Northup's slave narrative memoir, Twelve Years a Slave; his role in the abolitionist movement; and the absence of information regarding his death and burial.

== Cast ==
- Chiwetel Ejiofor as Solomon Northup / Platt
- Kelsey Scott as Anne Northup
- Michael Fassbender as Edwin Epps
- Benedict Cumberbatch as William Ford
- Paul Dano as John Tibeats
- Garret Dillahunt as Armsby
- Paul Giamatti as Theophilus Freeman
- Scoot McNairy as Merrill Brown
- Lupita Nyong'o as Patsey
- Adepero Oduye as Eliza
- Sarah Paulson as Mary Epps
- Brad Pitt as Samuel Bass
- Michael Kenneth Williams as Robert
- Alfre Woodard as Mistress Harriet Shaw
- Chris Chalk as Clemens Ray
- Taran Killam as Abram Hamilton
- Bill Camp as Ebenezer Radburn
- J. D. Evermore as Chapin
- Christopher Berry as James H. Birch
- Rob Steinberg as Mr. Parker
- Bryan Batt as Judge Turner
- Tom Proctor as Biddee
- Jay Huguley as Sheriff
- Storm Reid as Emily
- Quvenzhané Wallis as Margaret Northup
- Dwight Henry as Uncle Abram

== Historical accuracy ==
African-American history and culture scholar Henry Louis Gates Jr. was a consultant on the film. Researcher David Fiske, a co-author of Solomon Northup: The Complete Story of the Author of Twelve Years a Slave, provided some material used to market the film.

Emily West, an associate professor of history at the University of Reading who specializes in the history of slavery in the U.S., said she had "never seen a film represent slavery so accurately". Reviewing the film for History Extra, the website of BBC History Magazine, she wrote: "The film starkly and powerfully unveiled the sights and sounds of enslavement – from slaves picking cotton as they sang in the fields, to the crack of the lash down people's backs. We also heard a lot about the ideology behind enslavement. Masters such as William Ford and Edwin Epps, although very different characters, both used an interpretation of Christianity to justify their ownership of slaves. They believed the Bible sanctioned slavery, and that it was their 'Christian duty' to preach the scriptures to their slaves."

Scott Feinberg wrote in The Hollywood Reporter about a September 22 article in The New York Times that "dredged up and highlighted a 1985 essay by another scholar, James Olney, that questioned the 'literal truth' of specific incidents in Northup's account and suggested that David Wilson, the white amanuensis to whom Northup had dictated his story, had taken the liberty of sprucing it up to make it even more effective at rallying public opinion against slavery." Olney had observed that "slave autobiographies, when read one next to another, display an "overwhelming sameness." That is, though the autobiography by definition suggests a unique and personal story, that slave narratives present a genre of autobiographies that tell essentially the same story. There is a distinct repetitiveness when read in conjunction, as in this anthology. While this repetitiveness disallows the creativity and shaping of one's personal story, as Olney argues, it was equally important for slave narratives to follow a form that corroborated with the stories of others to create a collective picture of slavery as it then existed. In fact, the "same" form presented in all of these unique and individual stories created a powerful and resounding message of the consistent evils of slavery and the necessity of its demise.

A journal article published by The Johns Hopkins University Press and written by Sam Worley states that "Northup's narrative, though well known, has often been treated as a narrative of the second rank, albeit one with an unusually exciting and involving story as well as, thanks to the research of its modern editors, Sue Eakin and Joseph Logsdon, one with considerable historical value."

Noah Berlatsky wrote in The Atlantic about a scene in McQueen's adaptation. Shortly after Northup's kidnapping, he is sent on a slave ship. One of the sailors attempts to rape a female slave, but is stopped by a male slave. "The sailor unhesitatingly stabs and kills [the male slave]", he wrote, stating that "this seems unlikely on its face – slaves are valuable, and the sailor is not the owner. And, sure enough, the scene is not in the book." Berlatsky also states, "the sequence is an effort to present nuance and psychological depth – to make the film's depiction of slavery seem more real. But it creates that psychological truth by interpolating an incident that isn't factually true."

The visual blog Information is Beautiful deduced that, while taking creative license into account, the film was 88.1% accurate when compared to real-life events, summarizing: "While there are a touch of dramatic license here and there, the most gut-wrenching scenes really happened".

Forrest Wickman of Slate wrote of Northup's book giving a more favorable account of the author's onetime master, William Ford, than the McQueen film. In Northup's own words, "There never was a more kind, noble, candid, Christian man than William Ford," adding that Ford's circumstances "blinded [Ford] to the inherent wrong at the bottom of the system of Slavery." The movie, however, according to Wickman, "frequently undermines Ford." McQueen undercuts Christianity itself as well, in an effort to update the ethical lessons from Northup's story for the 21st century, by holding the institutions of Christianity up to the light for their ability to justify slavery at the time. Northup was a Christian of his time, writing of his former master being "blinded" by "circumstances" that in retrospect meant a racist acceptance of slavery despite being a Christian, a position untenable to Christians now and to Christian abolitionists of the 19th century but not contradictory to Northup himself. Valerie Elverton Dixon in The Washington Post characterized the Christianity depicted in the movie as "broken".

== Production ==
=== Development ===
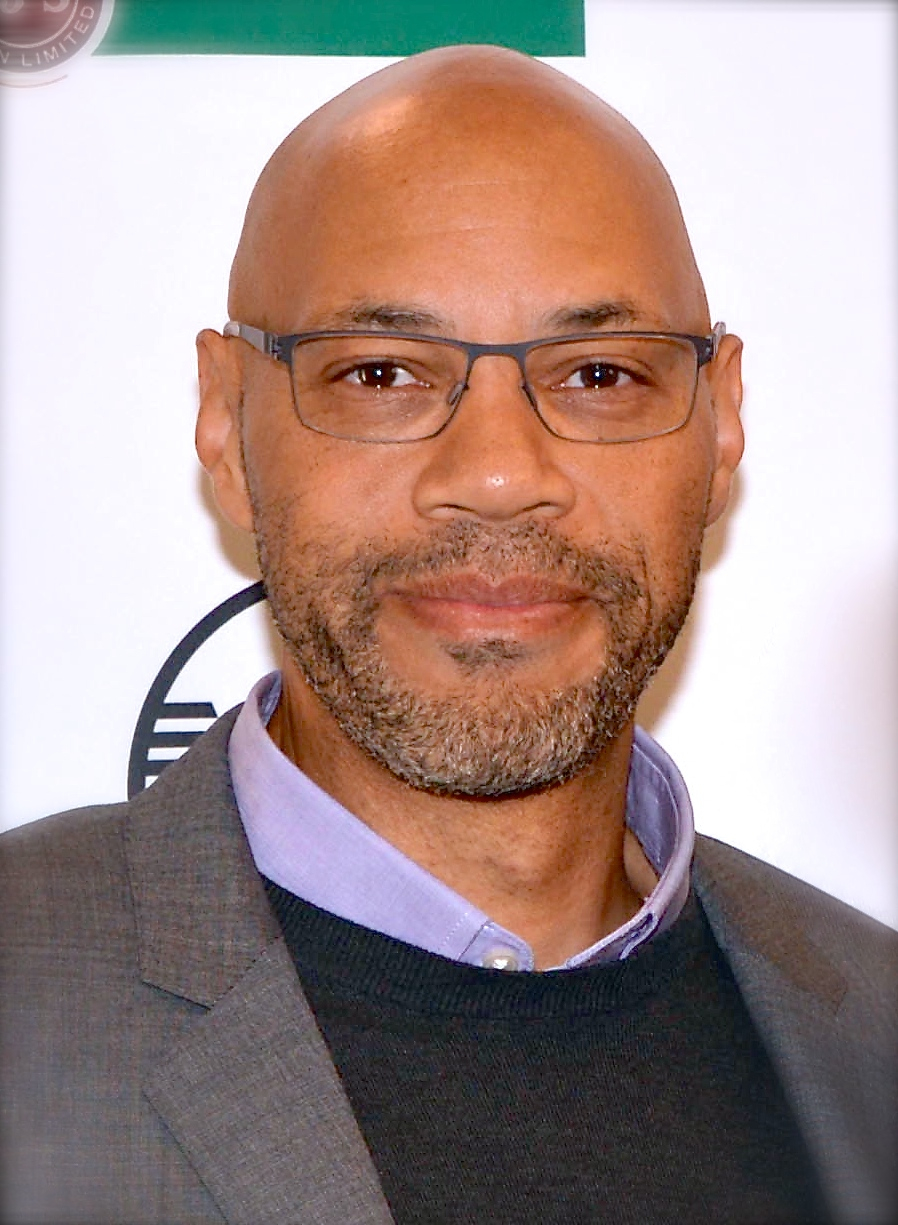
John Ridley in 2013

After meeting screenwriter John Ridley at a Creative Artists Agency screening of Hunger in 2008, director Steve McQueen got in touch with Ridley about his interest in making a film about "the slave era in America" with "a character that was not obvious in terms of their trade in slavery." Developing the idea back and forth, the two did not strike a chord until McQueen's partner, Bianca Stigter, found Solomon Northup's 1853 memoir Twelve Years a Slave. McQueen later told an interviewer:

I read this book, and I was totally stunned. At the same time, I was pretty upset with myself that I didn't know this book. I live in Amsterdam where Anne Frank is a national hero, and for me, this book read like Anne Frank's diary but written 97 years before – a firsthand account of slavery. I basically made it my passion to make this book into a film.

After a lengthy development process, Brad Pitt's production company Plan B Entertainment backed the project, which eventually helped get financing from various other film studios. The film was officially announced in August 2011 with McQueen to direct and Chiwetel Ejiofor to star as Solomon Northup, a free African-American who was kidnapped and sold into slavery in the Deep South. McQueen compared Ejiofor's conduct "of class and dignity" to that of Sidney Poitier and Harry Belafonte. In October 2011, Michael Fassbender (who starred in McQueen's previous films Hunger and Shame) joined the cast. In early 2012, the rest of the roles were cast, and filming was scheduled to begin at the end of June 2012.

To capture the language and dialects of the era and regions in which the film takes place, dialect coach Michael Buster assisted the cast in altering their speech. The language has a literary quality related to the style of writing of the day and the strong influence of the King James Bible. Buster explained:

We don't know what slaves sounded like in the 1840s, so I just used rural samples from Mississippi and Louisiana [for actors Ejiofor and Fassbender]. Then for Benedict [Cumberbatch], I found some real upper-class New Orleanians from the '30s. And then I also worked with Lupita Nyong'o, who is Kenyan but she did her training at Yale. So she really shifted her speech so she could do American speech.

After both won Oscars at the 86th Academy Awards, it was reported that McQueen and Ridley had been in an ongoing feud over screenplay credit. McQueen reportedly had asked Ridley for shared credit, which he declined. McQueen appealed to Fox Searchlight, which sided with Ridley. Neither thanked the other during their respective acceptance speeches at the event. Since the event, Ridley has noted his regret for not mentioning McQueen and denied the feud. He spoke favorably of working with McQueen, and explained that his sole screenplay credit was due to the rules of the Writers Guild of America. McQueen has not commented on the alleged feud.

=== Filming ===
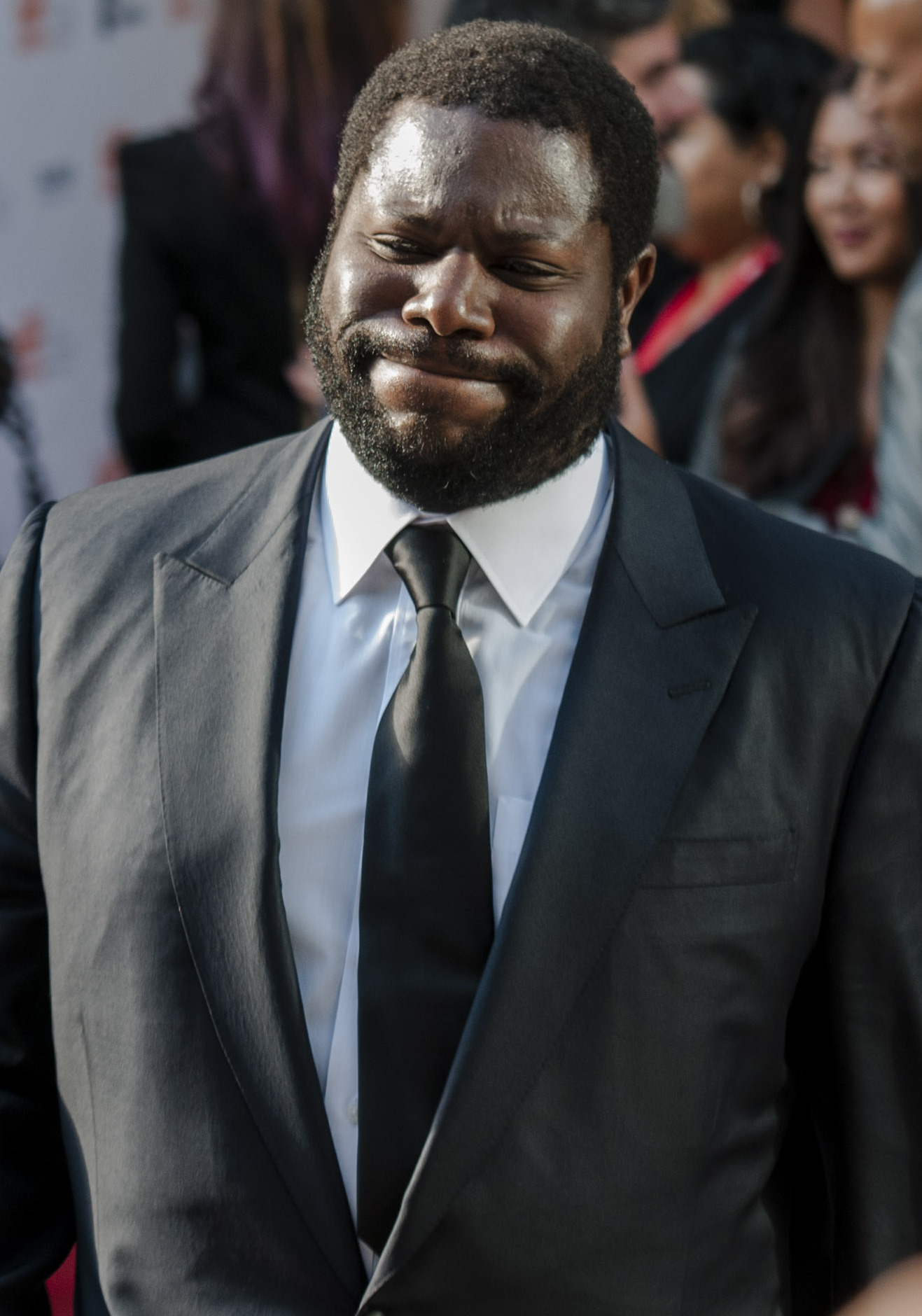
Director Steve McQueen at the premiere of 12 Years a Slave at the 2013 Toronto International Film Festival

With a production budget of $22 million, principal photography began in New Orleans, Louisiana, on June 27, 2012. After seven weeks, filming concluded on August 13, 2012. As a way to keep down production costs, a bulk of the filming took place around the greater New Orleans area – mostly south of the Red River country in the north of the state, where the historic Northup was enslaved. Among locations used were four historic antebellum plantations: Felicity, Bocage, Destrehan, and Magnolia. Magnolia, a plantation in Schriever, Louisiana, is just a few miles from one of the historic sites where Northup was held. "To know that we were right there in the place where these things occurred was so powerful and emotional," said actor Chiwetel Ejiofor. "That feeling of dancing with ghosts – it's palpable." Filming also took place at the Columns Hotel and Madame John's Legacy in the French Quarter of New Orleans for the scenes set in Washington D.C.

Cinematographer Sean Bobbitt shot 12 Years a Slave on 35 mm film using both the Arricam LT camera with Cooke S4 anamorphic lenses and the Arricam ST. "Particularly for a period piece, film gives the audience a definite sense of period and quality," said Bobbitt. "And because of the story's epic nature, widescreen clearly made the most sense. Widescreen means a big film, an epic tale – in this case an epic tale of human endurance."

The filmmakers avoided the desaturated visual style that is typical of a more gritty documentary aesthetic. Deliberately drawing visual comparisons in the filming to the works of Spanish painter Francisco Goya, McQueen explained:

When you think about Goya, who painted the most horrendous pictures of violence and torture and so forth, and they're amazing, exquisite paintings, one of the reasons they're such wonderful paintings is because what he's saying is, 'Look – look at this.' So if you paint it badly or put it in the sort of wrong perspective, you draw more attention to what's wrong with the image rather than looking at the image.

=== Design ===
To depict accurately the time period of the film, the filmmakers conducted extensive research that included studying artwork from the era. With eight weeks to create the wardrobe, costume designer Patricia Norris collaborated with Western Costume to compile costumes that would illustrate the passage of time while also being historically accurate. Using an earth-toned colour palette, Norris created nearly 1,000 costumes for the film. "She [Norris] took earth samples from all three of the plantations to match the clothes," McQueen said, "and she had the conversation with Sean [Bobbitt] to deal with the character temperature on each plantation, there was a lot of that minute detail."

=== Music ===
The musical score to 12 Years a Slave was composed by Hans Zimmer, with original on-screen violin music written and arranged by Nicholas Britell and performed by Tim Fain. The film also features a few pieces of western classical and American folk music such as Franz Schubert's "Trio in B-flat, D471", Daniel Dow's "Money Musk", and John and Alan Lomax's arrangement of "Run, Nigger, Run". A soundtrack album, Music from and Inspired by 12 Years a Slave, was released digitally on November 5 and received a physical format release on November 11, 2013, by Columbia Records. In addition to Zimmer's score, the album features music inspired by the film by artists such as John Legend, Laura Mvula, Alicia Keys, Chris Cornell, and Alabama Shakes. Legend's cover of "Roll, Jordan, Roll" debuted online three weeks prior to the soundtrack's release.

== Release ==
=== Initial screenings ===
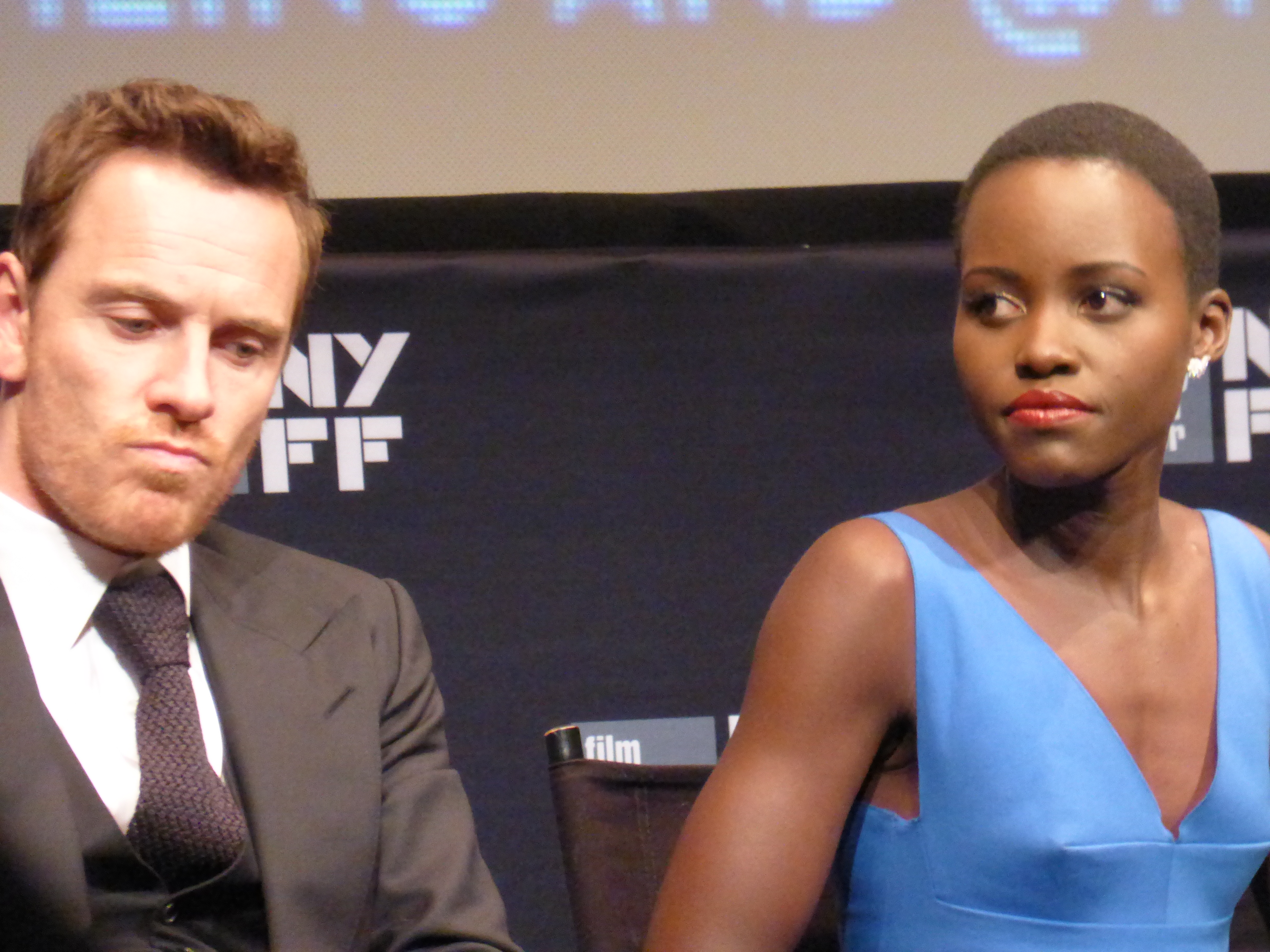
Michael Fassbender and Lupita Nyong'o at the 2013 New York Film Festival

On November 15, 2011, Summit Entertainment announced that it had closed deals for the distribution of 12 Years a Slave in most international markets. In April 2012, a few weeks before principal photography, New Regency Productions agreed to co-finance the film. Because of a distribution pact between 20th Century Fox and New Regency, Fox Searchlight Pictures acquired the film's American and Canadian distribution rights. However, instead of paying for the distribution rights, Fox Searchlight made a deal in which it would share box-office proceeds with the financiers of the independently financed film. 12 Years a Slave premiered at the Telluride Film Festival on August 30, 2013; it was later screened at the 2013 Toronto International Film Festival on September 6 where it was given the top People's Choice Award, the New York Film Festival on October 8, the New Orleans Film Festival on October 10, and the Philadelphia Film Festival on October 19. The film was commercially released on October 18, in the United States for a limited release of 19 theaters, with a wide release in subsequent weeks. The film was initially scheduled to be released in late December, but "some exuberant test screenings" led to the decision to move up the release date. The film was distributed by Entertainment One in the United Kingdom.

=== Marketing ===
Due to both the film's explicit nature and award contender status, 12 Years a Slave's financial success was being watched closely. Many analysts compared the film's content to other drama films of a similar vein such as Schindler's List (1993) and The Passion of the Christ (2004), which became box office successes despite their respective subject matters. "It may be a tough subject matter, but when handled well ... films that are tough to sit through can still be commercially successful," said Phil Contrino of Boxoffice Magazine. Despite its content, the film's critical success has assisted its domestic distribution by Fox Searchlight that began with a limited release aimed primarily towards art house and African-American patrons. The film's release was gradually widened in subsequent weeks, similarly to how the studio had successfully done in previous years with films such as Black Swan and The Descendants. International release dates for 12 Years a Slave were largely delayed to early 2014 in order to take advantage of the attention created by awards seasons.

During its marketing campaign, 12 Years a Slave received unpaid endorsements by celebrities such as Kanye West and Sean 'Diddy' Combs. In a video posted by Revolt, Combs urged viewers to see 12 Years a Slave by stating: "This movie is very painful but very honest, and is a part of the healing process. I beg all of you to take your kids, everybody to see it. ... You have to see this so you can understand, so you can just start to understand."

=== Home media ===
Following its cinematic release in theaters, the Region 1 Code widescreen edition of the film was released on DVD in the United States on March 4, 2014. Special features for the DVD include; a Closed Caption option, The Team – Meet the Creative Minds Assembled by Director Steve McQueen and Bring Solomon Northup's Journey to Life bonus selection, and The Score – Follow Film Composer Hans Zimmer Creating His Dramatic Score feature. In supplemental fashion, a widescreen hi-definition Blu-ray Disc version of the film was also released on the same day. Special features include; a historical portrait from Director Steve McQueen's documentary feature, cast and crew interviews, The Team special feature, and The Score selection. An additional viewing option for the film in the media format of Video on demand has been made available as well.

== Reception ==
=== Box office ===
12 Years a Slave earned $187.7 million, including $56.7 million in the United States. During its opening limited release in the United States, 12 Years a Slave debuted with a weekend total of $923,715 on 19 screens for a $48,617 per-screen average. The following weekend, the film entered the top ten after expanding to 123 theatres and grossing an additional $2.1 million. It continued to improve into its third weekend, grossing $4.6 million at 410 locations. The film release was expanded to over 1,100 locations on November 8, 2013. In 2014, 12 Years a Slave was the 10th-most illegally downloaded movie, with 23.653 million such downloads, according to Variety.

=== Critical response ===
Film review aggregator website Rotten Tomatoes reports that 95% of critics gave the film a positive rating, based on 379 reviews, with an average score of 8.90/10. The site's consensus states, "It's far from comfortable viewing, but 12 Years a Slave's unflinchingly brutal look at American slavery is also brilliant – and quite possibly essential – cinema." Metacritic, another review aggregator, assigned the film a weighted average score of 96 out of 100 based on 57 reviews from mainstream critics, indicating "universal acclaim". It is currently one of the site's highest-rated films, as well as the best-reviewed film of 2013. CinemaScore reported that audiences gave the film an "A" grade.

Richard Corliss of TIME wrote: "McQueen's film is closer in its storytelling particulars to such 1970s exploitation-exposés of slavery as Mandingo and Goodbye, Uncle Tom. Except that McQueen is not a schlockmeister sensationalist but a remorseless artist". Corliss draws parallels with Nazi Germany, saying, "McQueen shows that racism, aside from its barbarous inhumanity, is insanely inefficient. It can be argued that Nazi Germany lost the war both because it diverted so much manpower to the killing of Jews and because it did not exploit the brilliance of Jewish scientists in building smarter weapons. So the slave owners dilute the energy of their slaves by whipping them for sadistic sport and, as Epps does, waking them at night to dance for his wife's cruel pleasure." Gregory Ellwood of HitFix gave the film an "A−" rating, stating, "12 Years is a powerful drama driven by McQueen's bold direction and the finest performance of Chiwetel Ejiofor's career." He continued by praising the performances of Fassbender and Nyong'o, citing Nyong'o as "the film's breakthrough performance [that] may find Nyong'o making her way to the Dolby Theater next March". He also admired the film's "gorgeous" cinematography and the musical score, as "one of Hans Zimmer's more moving scores in some time". Paul MacInnes of The Guardian scored the film five out of five stars, writing, "Stark, visceral and unrelenting, 12 Years a Slave is not just a great film but a necessary one." The Guardian's Andrew Pulver said, in 2017, that 12 Years a Slave is "one of the most important films about the African-American experience ever".

Owen Gleiberman of Entertainment Weekly praised it as "a new movie landmark of cruelty and transcendence" and as "a movie about a life that gets taken away, and that's why it lets us touch what life is". He also commented very positively about Ejiofor's performance, while further stating, "12 Years a Slave lets us stare at the primal sin of America with open eyes, and at moments it is hard to watch, yet it's a movie of such humanity and grace that at every moment, you feel you're seeing something essential. It is Chiwetel Ejiofor's extraordinary performance that holds the movie together, and that allows us to watch it without blinking. He plays Solomon with a powerful inner strength, yet he never soft-pedals the silent nightmare that is Solomon's daily existence." Peter Travers of Rolling Stone, gave the film a four-star rating and said: "you won't be able to tuck this powder keg in the corner of your mind and forget it. What we have here is a blistering, brilliant, straight-up classic." He later named the film the best movie of 2013.

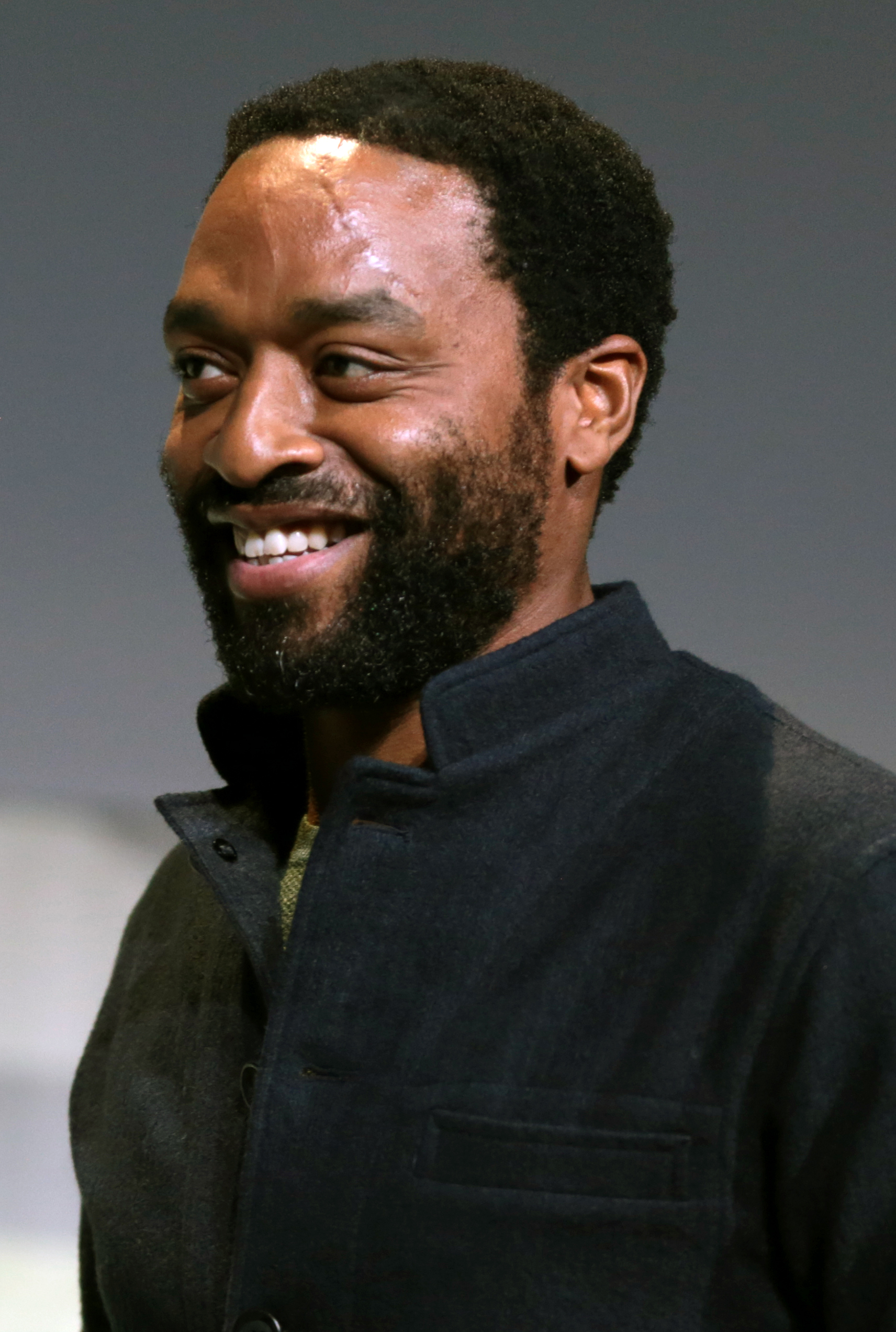
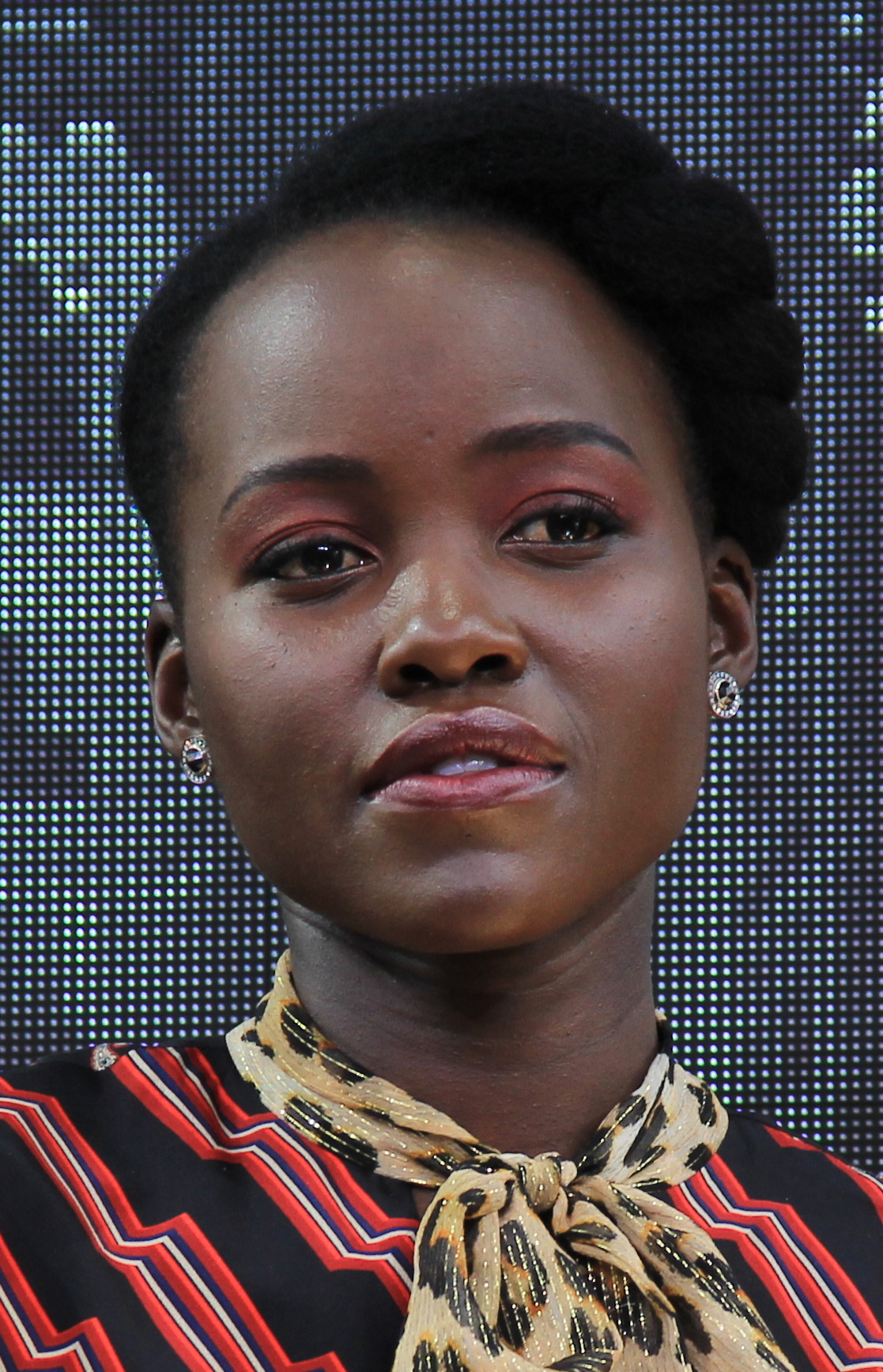
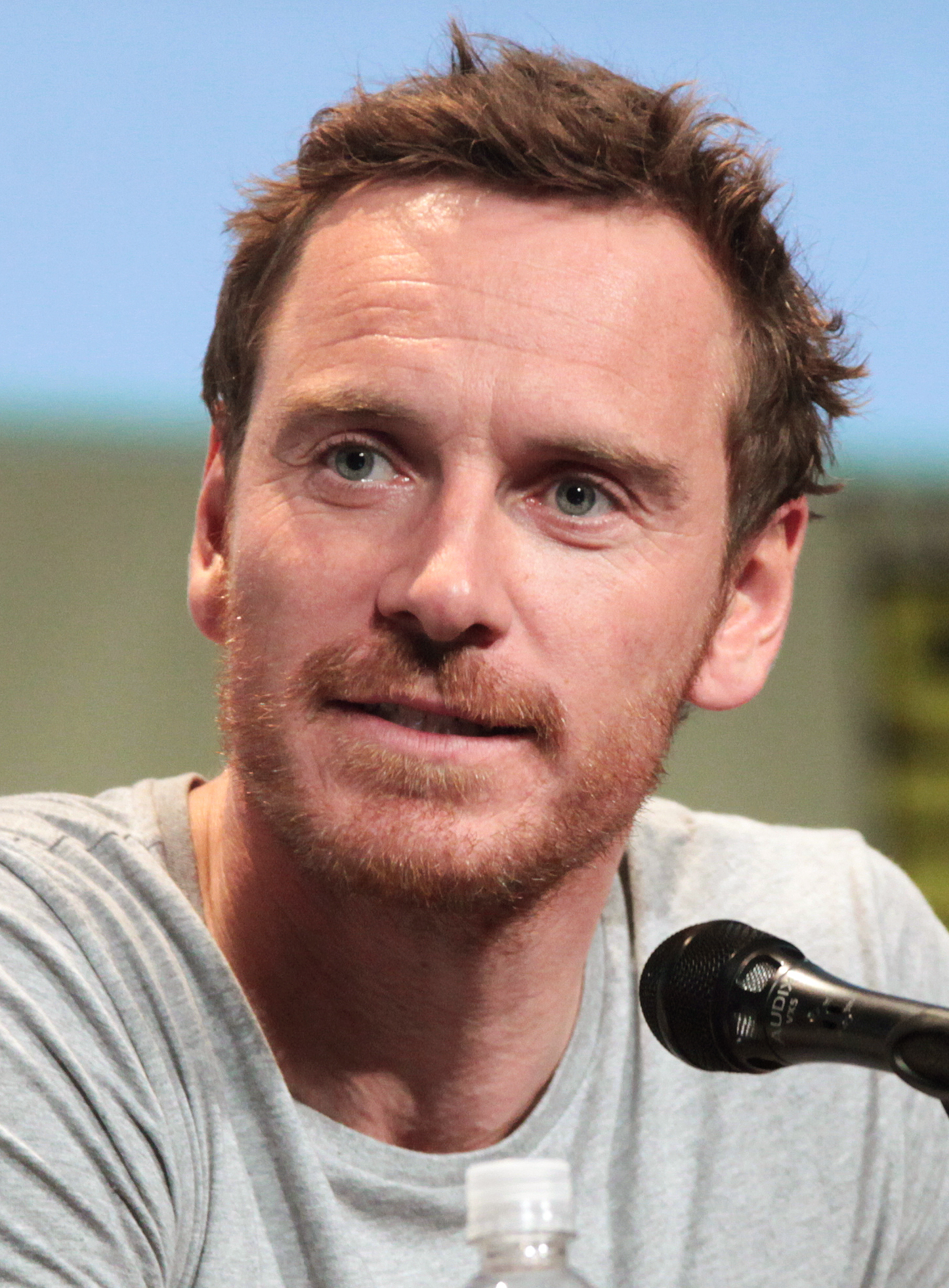
The performances of Chiwetel Ejiofor, Lupita Nyong'o and Michael Fassbender garnered widespread critical acclaim, earning them Academy Award nominations for Best Actor, Best Supporting Actress and Best Supporting Actor respectively, with Nyong'o winning her category.

Manohla Dargis wrote, in her review for The New York Times, "the genius of 12 Years a Slave is its insistence on banal evil, and on terror, that seeped into souls, bound bodies and reaped an enduring, terrible price". The Daily Telegraph's Tim Robey granted the film a maximum score of five stars, stating that "it's the nobility of this remarkable film that pierces the soul", while praising Ejiofor and Nyong'o's performances. Tina Hassannia of Slant Magazine said that "using his signature visual composition and deafening sound design, Steve McQueen portrays the harrowing realism of Northup's experience and the complicated relationships between master and slave, master and master, slave and slave, and so on". David Simon, the creator of the TV series The Wire, highly praised the movie, commenting that "it marks the first time in history that our entertainment industry, albeit with international creative input, has managed to stare directly at slavery and maintain that gaze".

The film was not without its criticisms. Stephanie Zacharek of The Village Voice was more critical of the film. While praising Ejiofor's work, she stated: "It's a picture that stays more than a few safe steps away from anything so dangerous as raw feeling. Even when it depicts inhuman cruelty, as it often does, it never compromises its aesthetic purity." Peter Malamud Smith of Slate criticized the story, saying, "12 Years a Slave is constructed as a story of a man trying to return to his family, offering every viewer a way into empathizing with its protagonist. Maybe we need a story framed on that individual scale in order to understand it. But it has a distorting effect all the same. We're more invested in one hero than in millions of victims; if we're forced to imagine ourselves enslaved, we want to imagine ourselves as Northup, a special person who miraculously escaped the system that attempted to crush him." Describing this as "the hero problem", Malamud Smith concluded his review explaining, "We can handle 12 Years a Slave. But don't expect 60 Years a Slave any time soon. And 200 Years, Millions of Slaves? Forget about it." Ignatiy Vishnevetsky of The A.V. Club opined that McQueen is "essentially tone-deaf when it comes to performance, and skirts by on casting". The film "lacks a necessary emotional continuity. I don't think it's something the movie is denying in the way it intentionally denies so many other conventions; it's still structured around an ending that's supposed to function as a release, but because it can't organize that sense of catharsis it so badly needs, it just feels as though McQueen is scurrying for an exit. Also: The cast is wildly uneven."

Some critics identified 12 Years a Slave as an example of the white savior narrative in film. Timothy Sneed said in U.S. News & World Report the year after the film was released, "Doubts still lingered about its ability to truly bring about a newfound racial consciousness among a national, mainstream audience ... The film also was a period piece that featured a happy ending ushered in by a 'white savior' in the form of Brad Pitt's character." At The Guardian, black Canadian author Orville Lloyd Douglas said he would not be seeing 12 Years a Slave, explaining: "I'm convinced these black race films are created for a white, liberal film audience to engender white guilt and make them feel bad about themselves. Regardless of your race, these films are unlikely to teach you anything you don't already know." A Black writer, Michael Arceneaux, wrote a rebuttal essay "We Don't Need To Get Over Slavery... Or Movies About Slavery". Arceneaux criticized Douglas for being ignorant and having an apathetic attitude towards black Americans and slavery.

=== Accolades ===
12 Years a Slave has received numerous awards and nominations. It earned three Academy Awards: Best Picture, Best Adapted Screenplay, and Best Supporting Actress. It won the Golden Globe Award for Best Motion Picture – Drama. The film also won the BAFTA Award for Best Film, while Ejiofor received the Best Actor award. In addition, the motion picture has been named as one of the best films of 2013 by various ongoing critics, appearing on 100 critics' top-ten lists in which 25 had the film in their number-one spot. This is the most of any film released in its production year. In 2021, members of Writers Guild of America West (WGAW) and Writers Guild of America, East (WGAE) voted its screenplay 54th in WGA’s 101 Greatest Screenplays of the 21st Century (So Far).

== See also ==
- List of black films of the 2010s
- List of films featuring slavery
- Solomon Northup's Odyssey, a 1984 television film adaptation of the same source material
- Black Seeds: The History of Africans in America (2021)
