= David Wilson (New York politician) =

American editor (1818–1870)

David Wilson (September 17, 1818 – June 9, 1870) was an American lawyer, writer and politician from New York. He is best known for his role in publishing Twelve Years a Slave, as told to him by Solomon Northup, in 1853.

== Early life ==
David Wilson was born on September 17, 1818, in West Hebron, Washington County, New York. He attended Salem Washington Academy in Salem, New York. Wilson graduated from Union College in 1840. Then he studied law, with future state senator Orville Clark, and was admitted to the bar in 1843.

== Law and politics ==
He practiced law in Whitehall. He was a Whig member of the New York State Assembly in 1852. In 1857, he was appointed as Deputy New York State Treasurer, and moved permanently to Albany. He was Clerk of the New York State Assembly from January 26, 1858, to January 4, 1859, officiating in the 81st New York State Legislature. At this time he was a member of the American Party. He was Deputy Clerk of the New York Court of Appeals from 1860 to 1862. (Note: His obituary in the Chicago Tribune states that he held this position from 1861 to 1864.)

== Author ==
After some time he abandoned the practice of law due to poor health, and engaged in literary pursuits, writing books on historical subjects.

=== Twelve Years a Slave ===
Wilson is best known for editing Solomon Northup's Twelve Years a Slave (1853). He met Northup through Orville Clark, who provided an affidavit for Northrup and circulated and signed a petition that helped free him. In the preface of the book, Wilson states that he corrected "numerous faults of style and of expression" and corrected discrepancies in the tale. (Note: David Fiske states that although Wilson is sometimes considered a ghost writer for the book, Wilson describes his role as editor. In addition, Northup, who was literate unlike many former slaves, reviewed the edited the material to ensure that the changes were accurate.)

Northup's motivation was different from those of fugitive slaves; Northup's narrative is rich with verifiable details; Northup had a significant role in writing the book; David Wilson, the book’s editor, was not an abolitionist; and Northup was entirely capable of telling his own story.

— David Fiske, Authenticity and Authorship: Twelve Years a Slave

Wilson stated that he had not intended for the book to be as long as it became. Northup had wanted to include a lot of details that may not be critical to the telling of the story, but made it an important historical account of life on several plantations and the cruelty they endured. A group of Union soldiers who had earlier read the book met Northrup's enslaver Edwin Epps during the Civil War. Epps told them that "a greater part of the book was truth."

Wilson clearly states that he had no objective beyond that of an editor in publishing the book. He was not an abolitionist who would actively seek the elimination of slavery. Politically, he was affiliated with the American Party, which did not have a stance for or against slavery. In the book's preface, Wilson states:

It is believed that the following account of his experience on Bayou Boeuf presents a correct picture of Slavery in all its lights, and shadows, as it now exists in that locality. Unbiased, as he conceives, by any prepossessions or prejudices, the only object of the editor has been to give a faithful history of Solomon Northup's life, as he received it from his lips.

— David Wilson, Preface, Twelve Years a Slave

=== Other historical subjects ===
Wilson wrote other books about historical subjects:

- Life in Whitehall: A Tale of the Ship Fever Times (1849), a collection of newspaper articles on Whitehall during a typhus outbreak.
- The Life of Jane McCrea: With an Account of Burgoyne’s Expedition in 1777 (1853), a biography of Jane McCrea.
- Henrietta Robinson (1855) about Mrs. Henrietta Robinson, known as the veiled murderess, who was sentenced to be hanged on August 3, 1855, at Troy, New York, for a murder.

== Later life and death ==
In his later years, Wilson was part-owner of a brewery. He died on June 9, 1870, in Albany, New York, (Note: Appleton's Cyclopedia erroneously gives June 9, 1887, as death date, and this was copied by other biographical dictionaries like Herringshaw's and Harper's.) and was buried at the New Hebron Cemetery in Hebron.

== Notes ==
New York State Assembly
Preceded by James Farr	New York State Assembly; Washington County, 2nd District; 1852	Succeeded by Samuel S. Beman
Government offices
Preceded by William Richardson	Clerk of the New York State Assembly; 1858–1859	Succeeded by William Richardson
