= Twelve Years a Slave =

1853 memoir by Solomon Northup

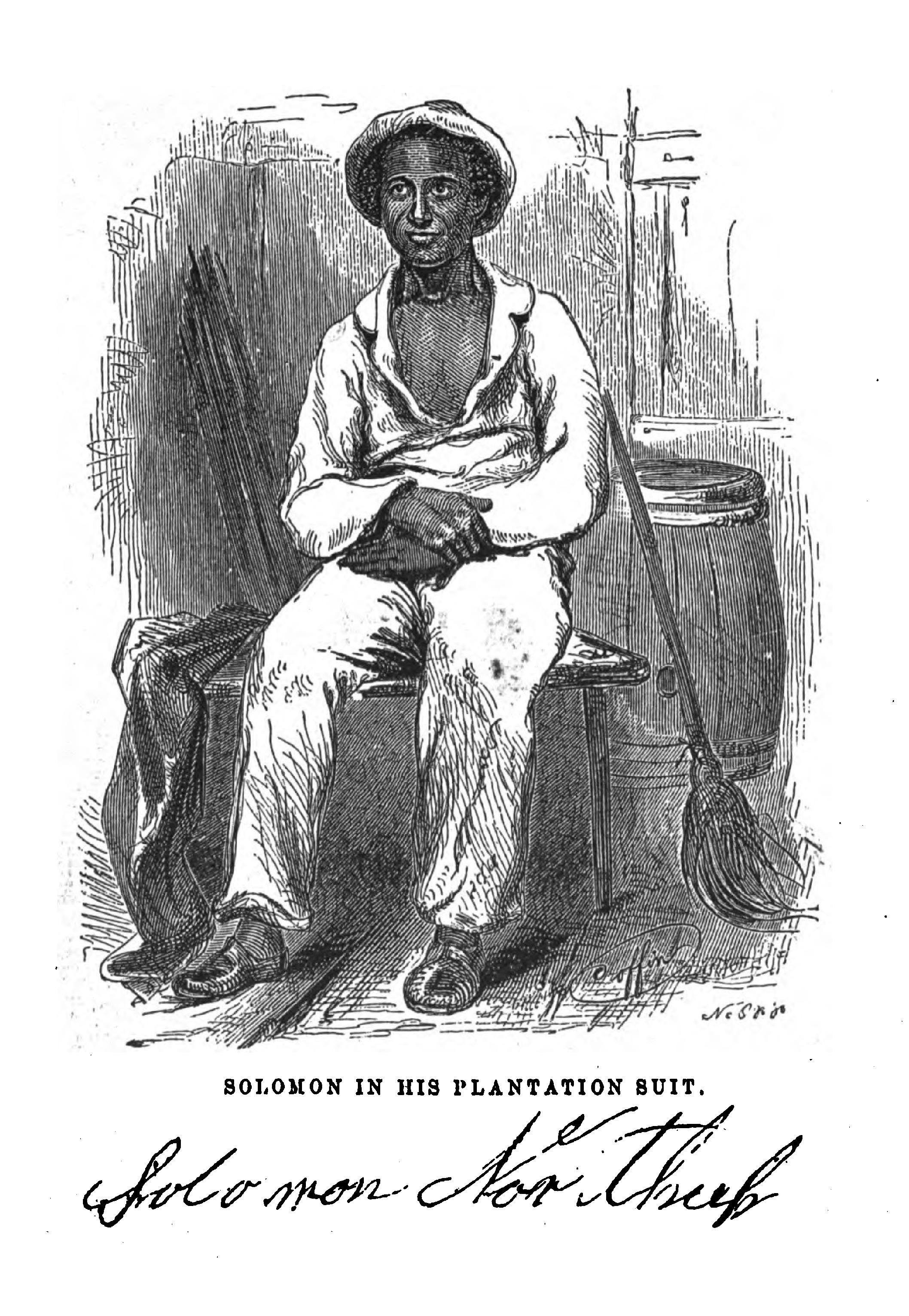
- Illustration from Twelve Years a Slave (1855)
- Author: David Wilson
- Original title: Twelve Years a Slave. Narrative of Solomon Northup, a Citizen of New-York, Kidnapped in Washington City in 1841, and Rescued in 1853, from a Cotton Plantation Near the Red River, in Louisiana.
- Language: English
- Subject: slave narrative as told by Solomon Northup
- Genre: Autobiography, slave narrative
- Publisher: Derby & Miller, Auburn, New York
- Publication date: 1853
- Publication place: United States
- Media type: Print (hardcover)
- ISBN: 978-1843914716
- Dewey Decimal: 301.45
- Text: Twelve Years a Slave at Wikisource

Twelve Years a Slave is an 1853 memoir and slave narrative by Solomon Northup as told to and edited by David Wilson. Northup, a Black man who was born free and was an occasional touring musician in New York State, relates that he was lured to go to Washington, D.C. for promised work, but instead he was kidnapped and sold into slavery in the Deep South. He was in bondage for 12 years in Louisiana before he was able to secretly get information to friends and family in New York, who in turn secured his release with the aid of the state. Northup's account provides extensive details on the slave markets in Washington, D.C., and New Orleans, and describes at length cotton and sugar cultivation and slave treatment on major plantations in Louisiana.

The work was published by Derby & Miller of Auburn, New York, eight years before the American Civil War and soon after Harriet Beecher Stowe's best-selling novel about slavery, Uncle Tom's Cabin (1852), to which Northup's book lent factual support. Northup's book, dedicated to Stowe, sold 30,000 copies, making it a bestseller in its own right.

Although the memoir was published in several editions in the 19th century and later cited by scholarly works on slavery in the United States, it fell into public obscurity for nearly 100 years. It was re-discovered on separate occasions by two Louisiana historians, Sue Eakin (Louisiana State University at Alexandria) and Joseph Logsdon (University of New Orleans). In the early 1960s, they researched and retraced Solomon Northup's journey and co-edited a historically annotated version that was published by Louisiana State University Press (1968).

The memoir has been adapted as two film versions, produced as the 1984 PBS television film Solomon Northup's Odyssey and the 2013 film 12 Years a Slave, which won three Academy Awards including Best Picture.

== Synopsis ==
In his home town of Saratoga Springs, New York, Solomon Northup, a free negro and a skilled carpenter and violinist, was approached by two circus promoters, Brown and Hamilton. They offered him a brief, high-paying job as a musician with their traveling circus. Without informing his wife, who was away at work in a nearby town, he traveled with the strangers to downstate New York and Washington, D.C. Soon after arriving in the capital, he awoke to find himself drugged, bound, and in the cell of a slave pen. When Northup asserted his rights as a free man, he was beaten by slave trader James H. Birch and warned to never again mention his free life in New York.

Transported by ship to Theophilus Freeman's slave jail in New Orleans, Northup and other enslaved black people contracted smallpox and one died. In transit, Northup implored a sympathetic sailor to send a letter to his family. The letter arrived safely, but, lacking knowledge of his final destination, Northup's family was unable to effect his rescue.

Northup's first owner was William Prince Ford, who ran a lumber mill on a bayou of the Red River. Northup subsequently had several other owners, less humane than Ford, during his twelve-year bondage. At times, his carpentry and other skills contributed to his being treated relatively well, but he also suffered extreme cruelty. On two occasions, he was attacked by John Tibeats, a white man he was leased to, and defended himself, for which he suffered severe reprisals. After about two years of enslavement, Northup was sold to Edwin Epps, a notoriously cruel cotton planter. Epps held Northup enslaved for 10 years, during which time he assigned the New Yorker to various roles from cotton picker, to hauler to driver, which required Northup to oversee the work of fellow slaves and punish them for undesirable behavior. While on Epps' plantation, Northup became friends with a slave girl named Patsey, whom he writes about briefly in the book.

After being beaten for claiming his free status in Washington, D.C., Northup in the ensuing 12 years did not reveal his true history again to a single person, slave or owner. Finally he confided his story to Samuel Bass, a white carpenter and abolitionist from Canada working at the Epps plantation (to build the Edwin Epps House). Bass, at great risk to himself, sent letters to Northup's wife and friends in Saratoga. Parker, a white shopkeeper, received one of the letters and sought assistance from Henry B. Northup, a white attorney and politician whose family had held and freed Solomon Northup's father and with whom Solomon had a longtime friendship. Henry contacted New York state officials. As the state had passed a law in 1840 to provide financial resources for the rescue of citizens kidnapped into slavery, the Governor appointed Henry Northup as an agent to travel to Louisiana and work with law enforcement to free Solomon. Once in Louisiana, Henry Northup hired a local Avoyelles Parish attorney, John P. Waddill, to assist in securing Solomon Northup's freedom. After a variety of bureaucratic measures and searches were undertaken, the attorney succeeded in locating Solomon and freeing him from the plantation. Northup later filed charges against the men who sold him into slavery but was unsuccessful in his suit. He returned to New York and reunited with his family there.

Northup concludes his narrative with the following statement:

My narrative is at an end. I have no comments to make upon the subject of Slavery. Those who read this book may form their own opinions of the "peculiar institution." What it may be in other States, I do not profess to know; what it is in the region of Red River, is truly and faithfully delineated in these pages. This is no fiction, no exaggeration. If I have failed in anything, it has been in presenting to the reader too prominently the bright side of the picture. I doubt not hundreds have been as unfortunate as myself; that hundreds of free citizens have been kidnapped and sold into slavery, and are at this moment wearing out their lives on plantations in Texas and Louisiana. But I forbear. Chastened and subdued in spirit by the sufferings I have borne, and thankful to that good Being through whose mercy I have been restored to happiness and liberty, I hope henceforward to lead an upright though lowly life, and rest at last in the church yard where my father sleeps.

— Solomon Northup

== Reception and historical value ==
Although questions were often raised about accuracy or authenticity of books about slavery, including slave narratives, Northrup's memoir is well documented, including through court records. Similarities between Northup's book and Harriet Beecher Stowe's novel Uncle Tom's Cabin have been noted by reviewers. Stowe's book was published a year before Northup's memoir but by the time she published her rebuttal to critics about accuracy in her A Key to Uncle Tom's Cabin, she referred to his story, which had been publicized in newspaper accounts. Stowe wrote,

It is a singular coincidence that this man was carried to a plantation in the Red River country, that same region where the scene of Tom's captivity was laid; and his account of this plantation, his mode of life there, and some incidents which he describes, form a striking parallel to that history.

Northup's account confirms Stowe's fictional portrayal of conditions in Louisiana, as the area where Northup was enslaved was close to the fictional setting of Simon Legree's plantation on the Red River. Northup expresses other arguments against slavery. For instance, Uncle Tom's Cabin focuses on how the legal system prevents even kind owners from treating slaves well and how it releases cruel owners from liabilities for their treatment of slaves.

Such themes appear in Northup's narrative, too. Writing about this work, Eric Herschtal noted that "Slave narratives were never intended to give an unbiased view. They were antislavery polemics meant to bring down the institution." The fact that these works had a purpose was similar to other published works.

Herschtal emphasizes that Northup expressed compassion in his account, quoting him: "It is not the fault of the slaveholder that he is cruel," Northup writes, "so much as it is the fault of the system under which he lives." Northup's first-person account of his twelve years of bondage captured attention in the national political debate over slavery that took place in the years leading up to the Civil War. It drew endorsements from major Northern newspapers, anti-slavery organizations, and evangelical groups. It "sold three times as many copies as Frederick Douglass's slave narrative in its first two years."

Northup's account describes in detail the daily life of slaves at Bayou Boeuf in Louisiana, their diet and living conditions, the relationship between master and slave, and the means that slave catchers used to recapture runaways. His account shares some details similar to those of authors who were escaped slaves, such as Frederick Douglass, Harriet Jacobs, and William Wells Brown. However, Northup was unique in documenting his being kidnapped as a freeman from the North and sold into slavery. His perspective was always to compare what he saw to what he knew before while living as a free man in a free state. While there were hundreds of such kidnappings, he was among the few persons who gained freedom again.

Early and mid-twentieth century historians of slavery, Kenneth Stampp, Stanley Elkins, and Ulrich Bonnell Phillips, endorsed the historical accuracy of the book. Eakin and Logsdon in 1968, wrote: "In the last analysis, [the] narrative deserves to be believed, not simply because [Northup] seems to be talking reasonably, not merely because he adorns his tale with compelling and persuasive details. At every point where materials exist for checking his account, it can be verified." These materials include trial records, correspondence, diary, and slave sale records.

Historian Jesse Holland noted in a 2009 interview that he was able to rely on Northup's memoir with its detailed description of Washington in 1841 to identify the location of some slave markets in the capital. Holland has also researched the roles of African American slaves who, as skilled laborers, helped build some of the important public buildings in Washington, including the Capitol and parts of the original White House.

While Twelve Years a Slave is the best-known example of someone who was kidnapped and later freed – albeit through extraordinary efforts – historians have begun to research and present other cases. Most of the known court cases of freedom suits related to kidnapping victims were filed in New Orleans, although some were in border states such as Missouri. One such suit took place in Tuscaloosa, Alabama, where Cornelius Sinclair, a free black man from Philadelphia, Pennsylvania, had been sold after being kidnapped in August 1825 and transported South with some younger free blacks. A total of about 20 young blacks disappeared from the Philadelphia area that summer, some survivors sold into slavery in Mississippi. Helped by the intervention of Philadelphia mayor Joseph Watson, most of those kidnapped were returned free to Philadelphia by June 1826, but Sinclair's odyssey was longer. He was freed in 1827 by a unanimous verdict of an all-white jury.

=== Reissue ===
After additional printings in the 19th century, the book went out of print until 1968, when historians Joseph Logsdon and Sue Eakin restored it to prominence. Eakin discovered the story as a child growing up in Louisiana plantation country – the owner of a first edition showed her the book, after finding it in a former plantation home.

Years later, Logsdon had a student from an old Louisiana family who brought a copy of the original 1853 book to class; her family had owned it for more than a century. Together Logsdon and Eakin studied Northup's account, documenting it through the slave sales records of Washington, D.C., and New Orleans, by retracing his journey and bondage in Bayou Boeuf plantation country in central Louisiana and through its records, and documenting his New York State origins. They found his father's freeman's decree, and the case files for the legal work that restored Northup's freedom and prosecuted his abductors. In 1968, Eakin and Logsdon's thoroughly annotated edition of the original book was published by Louisiana State University Press, shedding new light on Northup's account and establishing its historic significance. That book has been widely used by scholars and in classrooms for more than 40 years, and is still in print.

In 1998, Logsdon was invited by scholars in upstate New York to participate in a search for Solomon's grave. However, bad weather prevented the search that year, and Logsdon died the following June 1999. In 2007, shortly before her death at age 90, Eakin completed an updated and expanded version of their book; it includes more than 150 pages of new background material, maps, and photographs. In 2013, e-book and audiobook versions of her final definitive edition were released in her honor. With permission, scholars may use Eakin's lifetime archives through The Sue Eakin Collection, Louisiana State University at Alexandria, Louisiana. The Joseph Logsdon Archives are available at the University of New Orleans.

== Editions and adaptations ==
Scene at the New Orleans slave pen.
Excerpt from Ch. 6, via LibriVox
00:6:36 (text)

=== Text ===
- Twelve Years a Slave is in the public domain; e-book versions can be downloaded from several sites and many reprints are still in print by multiple publishers (see 'External links' section)
- In 1968, historians Sue Eakin and Joseph Logsdon, both based in Louisiana, published an edited and annotated version of Northup's narrative. Updated and illustrated editions of this work have since been published, including an adaptation for younger readers.
- In 2012, David Fiske self-published the biography Solomon Northup: His Life Before and After Slavery. The book's Appendix C provides the publishing history for Twelve Years a Slave during the 19th century. The book was expanded and re-issued by Praeger in August 2013 as Solomon Northup: The Complete Story of the Author of Twelve Years a Slave, ISBN 978-1440829741, with co-authors Fiske, Clifford W. Brown, and Rachel Seligman.

=== Film ===
- Solomon Northup's Odyssey (1984), a PBS television film directed by Gordon Parks and starring Avery Brooks.
- 12 Years a Slave (2013), a feature film directed by Steve McQueen and starring Chiwetel Ejiofor.

=== Audiobook ===
- Twelve Years a Slave public domain audiobook at LibriVox
- Twelve Years a Slave, narrated by Louis Gossett Jr. (Eakin Films & Publishing, 2013)
- Twelve Years a Slave, narrated by Richard Allen (Dreamscape Media, 2013)
- Twelve Years a Slave, narrated by Hugh Quarshie (AudioGO, 2013)
- Twelve Years a Slave, narrated by Sean Crisden (Tantor Audio, 2012)
