= Cheneyville, Louisiana =

- Town
- Town of Cheneyville
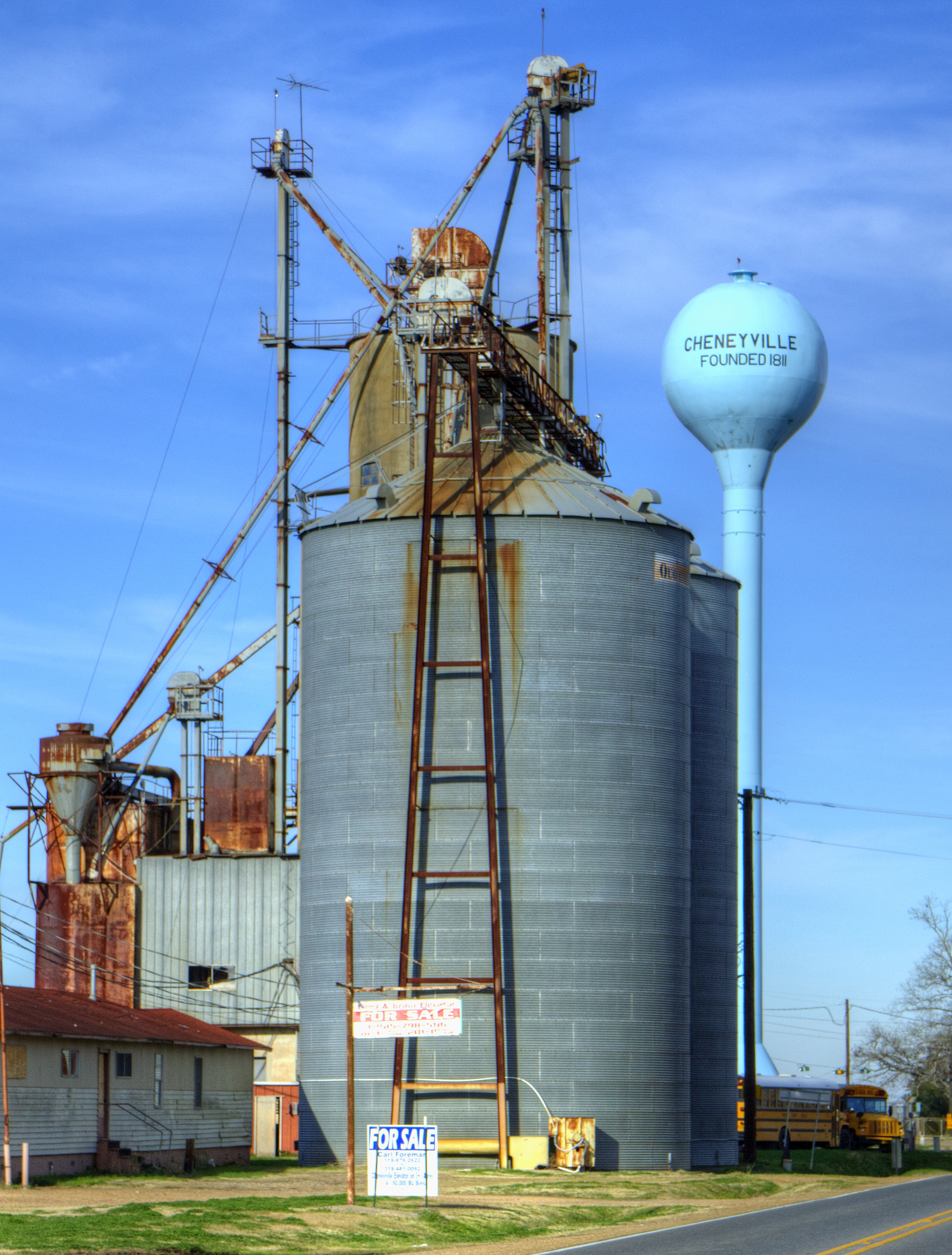

- Location of Cheneyville in Rapides Parish, Louisiana.

- Location of Louisiana in the United States
- Coordinates: 31°00′48″N 92°17′22″W
- Country: United States
- State: Louisiana
- Parish: Rapides

Government

Area
  - Total: 1.02 sq mi (2.63 km^{2})
  - Land: 1.02 sq mi (2.63 km^{2})
  - Water: 0 sq mi (0.00 km^{2})
- Elevation: 62 ft (19 m)

Population (2020)
  - Total: 468
  - Density: 460.6/sq mi (177.82/km^{2})
- Time zone: UTC-6 (CST)
  - Summer (DST): UTC-5 (CDT)
- Area code: 318
- FIPS code: 22-14660
- GNIS feature ID: 2406260

Cheneyville is a town in Rapides Parish, Louisiana, United States. It is part of the Alexandria, Louisiana Metropolitan Statistical Area. As of the 2020 census, Cheneyville had a population of 468.

== History ==
The town was named for settler William Cheney.

Cheneyville is significant in the history of the Restoration Movement associated with Alexander Campbell. In 1843 most of the membership of a Baptist congregation, under the leadership of William Prince Ford, who had been influenced by Campbell's writings, became a Church of Christ. The Cheneyville Christian Church is the oldest congregation associated with the Restoration Movement in Louisiana. In 1857, Campbell visited the congregation and was favorably impressed by its fellowship between the races.

Ford is also known as the original enslaver of Solomon Northup, the main character in the feature film, Twelve Years a Slave. Northup was an African-American who had been born free, but kidnapped in Washington, D.C., and sold to Ford in New Orleans in 1841.

== Geography ==
According to the United States Census Bureau, Cheneyville has a total area of 1.0 square mile (2.6 km^{2}), all land.

== Demographics ==
Historical population
Census	Pop.	Note	%±
1910	498		—
1920	678		36.1%
1930	835		23.2%
1940	913		9.3%
1950	918		0.5%
1960	1,037		13.0%
1970	1,082		4.3%
1980	865		−20.1%
1990	1,005		16.2%
2000	901		−10.3%
2010	625		−30.6%
2020	468		−25.1%
2025 (est.)	441	▼	−5.8%
U.S. Decennial Census

=== 2020 census ===
Cheneyville racial composition
Race	Number	Percentage
White (non-Hispanic)	121	25.85%
Black or African American (non-Hispanic)	320	68.38%
Other/Mixed	22	4.7%
Hispanic or Latino	5	1.07%

As of the 2020 United States census, there were 468 people, 275 households, and 156 families residing in the town.

=== 2000 census ===
As of the census of 2000, there were 901 people, 267 households, and 183 families residing in the town. The population density was 863.9 inhabitants per square mile (333.6/km^{2}). There were 314 housing units at an average density of 301.1 per square mile (116.3/km^{2}). The racial makeup of the town was 33.07% White, 65.70% African American, 0.33% Native American, 0.55% from other races, and 0.33% from two or more races. Hispanic or Latino of any race were 2.33% of the population.

There were 267 households, out of which 28.5% had children under the age of 18 living with them, 39.7% were married couples living together, 26.2% had a female householder with no husband present, and 31.1% were non-families. 28.5% of all households were made up of individuals, and 14.6% had someone living alone who was 65 years of age or older. The average household size was 2.71 and the average family size was 3.39.

In the town, the population was spread out, with 24.0% under the age of 18, 10.2% from 18 to 24, 30.4% from 25 to 44, 22.6% from 45 to 64, and 12.8% who were 65 years of age or older. The median age was 36 years. For every 100 females, there were 103.8 males. For every 100 females age 18 and over, there were 102.1 males.

The median income for a household in the town was $19,044, and the median income for a family was $21,917. Males had a median income of $21,250 versus $12,159 for females. The per capita income for the town was $10,244. About 29.4% of families and 43.9% of the population were below the poverty line, including 46.2% of those under age 18 and 27.0% of those age 65 or over.

== Notable people ==
- C. H. "Sammy" Downs lived in Cheneyville.
- Wilbur Dyer, state representative from south Rapides Parish from 1974 to 1980
- Sue Eakin, author and editor of Twelve Years a Slave.
- Leroy Augustus Stafford, a Rapides Parish planter and brigadier general in the Confederate Army.

== See also ==
- List of towns in Louisiana
