= Wilbur Dyer =

American politician (1907–1985)

Louisiana State Representative for District 25 (Rapides Parish)
- In office 1974–1980
- Preceded by: Robert J. Munson
- Succeeded by: Charles W. DeWitt, Jr.

Personal details
- Born: April 6, 1907
- Died: January 22, 1985 (aged 77)
- Party: Democratic
- Spouse: Burma Harris Dyer
- Children: 3

Wilbur Dyer (April 6, 1907 – January 22, 1985) was a Democrat from Cheneyville, Louisiana, who served from 1974 to 1980 in the Louisiana House of Representatives.

Dyer won a special election to succeed Robert J. Munson, after he resigned from office in September 1973. Dyer held the seat until 1980, when Charles W. DeWitt, Jr. was elected.

Dyer and his wife, the former Burma Harris, had three children. Dyer died at the age of 77.

Preceded by Robert J. Munson	Louisiana State Representative for District 25 (Rapides Parish); 1974–1980	Succeeded by Charles W. DeWitt, Jr.
