= Patsey =

African American enslaved woman, written about in 12 Years a Slave

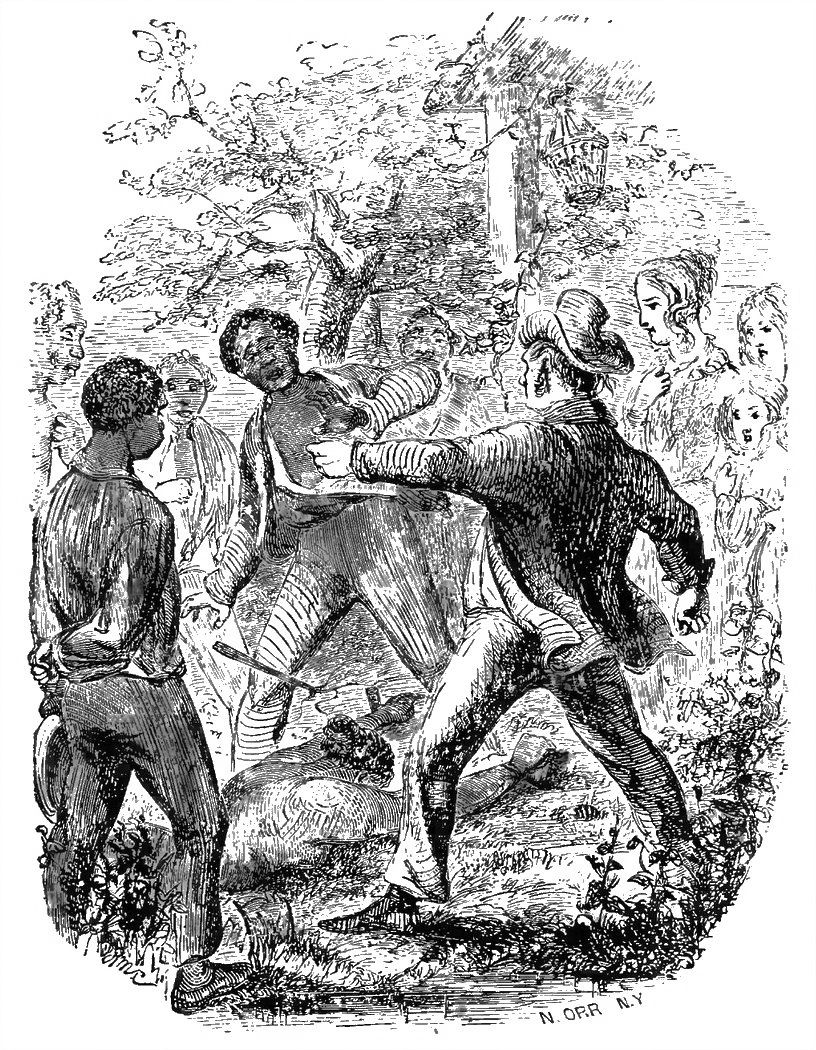
- Sketch from Solomon Northup's book The staking out and flogging of the girl named Patsey
- Born: c. 1817; South Carolina
- Died: after 1863
- Known for: Twelve Years a Slave

Patsey (c. 1817–after 1863) was an African American enslaved woman. Solomon Northup wrote about her in his book Twelve Years a Slave, which is the source for most of the information about her. There have been two adaptations of the book in film: Solomon Northup's Odyssey (1984), and the better known 12 Years a Slave (2013). In the latter, Patsey was portrayed by Lupita Nyong'o, who won the Academy Award for Best Supporting Actress for her performance.

== Life ==
Patsey's mother was said to have been an African woman from Guinea, enslaved and taken to Spanish-ruled Cuba. She was then sold to a family named Buford in the Southern United States. Patsey is believed to have been born around 1817. In 1830, when she was 13, she was sold to Edwin Epps in Louisiana as a slave. According to Northup, Edwin Epps had "repulsive and coarse" manners and did not have a sense "of kindness or of justice." When drunk, he would whip his slaves, enjoying the sound of their screams.

Epps leased the Bayou Huffpower plantation from Joseph B. Robert, his wife's uncle. In 1845, Epps moved Patsey and other enslaved people to his 300-acre (1.2 km^{2}) plantation near Bunkie in Avoyelles Parish, Louisiana. Solomon Northup and Patsey became friends on the Epps plantation. Known as the "queen of the fields", Patsey was often praised by her owner for her ability to pick large amounts of cotton, up to 500 lb (230 kg) a day. Northup said that she was unlike the other enslaved people and had a spirit that was unwavering in its strength. She had been "a joyous creature, a laughing, light-hearted girl" who fervently dreamed of freedom.

While she was a teenager, Epps began raping her. He whipped Patsey if she resisted his sexual demands, which left "scars of thousand stripes" on her back. His wife, Mary, was jealous of Patsey, and "nothing delighted the mistress so much as to see her suffer," according to Northup. She physically abused Patsey and demanded that Epps sell Patsey, which he would not do. Mary tried to bribe other workers and enslaved people to kill Patsey and dump her body in the swamps, but no one would. Even though Patsey was a highly productive enslaved person and a favorite of Epps, she endured abuse by a "licentious master and a jealous mistress".

On one occasion, Patsey went to a neighboring plantation for a bar of soap. When Epps found out she had left his plantation, he had four stakes hammered into the ground and ordered her hands and feet to be tied to them; she was stripped naked, and Epps ordered Northup to whip her. Epps then took the whip himself until she was "literally flayed" from over 50 lashes. Epps had saltwater poured over her wounds. Patsey nearly died. Northup and Patsey were severely traumatized due to all the abuse that she endured. After this brutal whipping, she lost her light-hearted manner, the sparkle in her eyes, and the ease of her laughter. She often wished that she would die.

Northup knew Patsey for almost a decade. As he was about to leave the Epps plantation in 1853, he said that:

Patsey ran from behind a cabin and threw her arms about my neck. 'Oh! Platt [the name given to Northup by his kidnappers],' she cried, tears streaming down her face, 'you're goin' to be free—you're goin' way off yonder where we'll neber see ye any more. You've saved me a good many whipping, Platt; I'm glad you're goin' to be free—but oh! de Lord, de Lord! what'll become of me?

— Solomon Northup

Northup then boarded a carriage to freedom and he never saw her again. In 1854, his book Twelve Years a Slave was published. Almost ten years after, during the American Civil War, the 110th New York Infantry Regiment came to the plantation. They met Bob, one of the enslaved men mentioned in Northup's book, which several soldiers had read. Patsey left the plantation in May 1863 with the Union soldiers. Patsey's life and fate thereafter are unknown. In 1850, Patsey had a daughter named Mary White, born into slavery on the Epps plantation. Mary was later sold down south, and she had children of her own, sons Jacob White and George Dudley White and a daughter Sarah White, who told the family story to her children.

== Popular culture ==
The 2013 film 12 Years a Slave was nominated for nine Academy Awards and won the Academy Award for Best Picture. With renewed interest from the film, historians continue to research in hopes of pinpointing more specifically what happened to her.

== See also ==
- List of people who disappeared

== Bibliography ==
- Fiske, David; Brown, Clifford W.; Seligman, Rachel (2013). Solomon Northup: The Complete Story of the Author of Twelve Years a Slave., a complete biography of Northup
- Northup, Solomon (1853). Twelve Years a Slave: Narrative of Solomon Northup, a citizen of New York, kidnapped in Washington city in 1841, and rescued in 1853, from a cotton plantation near the Red River in Louisiana. Derby & Miller. p. 362. ISBN 978-1-84391-471-6.
