= Bayou Huffpower =

Stream in Avoyelles Parish, Louisiana, U.S.

Coordinates: 30°57′08″N 92°6′33″W

Bayou Huffpower is a stream in Avoyelles Parish between Cottonport and Bunkie, Louisiana, named for an old settler. Bayou Hoffpauir was the name of a United States post office in the area. Pitt's Mill was located on Bayou Huffpower at Evergreen-Holmesville Road and Layou du Lac Road, two miles west of Evergreen, Louisiana.

== See also ==
- Epps plantation
  - Solomon Northup, author of the memoir, Twelve Years a Slave
  - Patsey
- Frithland, a house on the National Register of Historic Places
- James Madison Wells, who had a sugar plantation on the bayou called New Hope, near Alexandria
