= Theophilus Freeman =

American slave trader

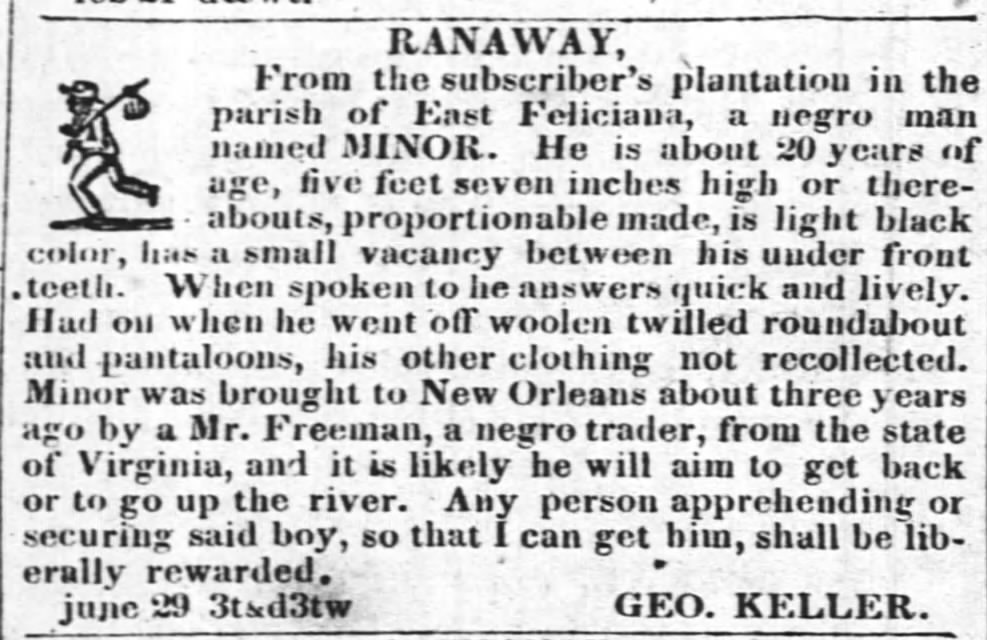
"Ranaway from the subscriber's plantation in the parish of East Feliciana..." New Orleans Times-Picayune, July 2, 1841

Theophilus Freeman (c. 1800 – May 18, 1860) was an American slave trader active in Virginia, Louisiana and Mississippi. He was known in his own time as wealthy and problematic. Freeman's business practices were described in two antebellum American slave narratives—that of John Brown and that of Solomon Northup—and he appears as a character in both filmed dramatizations of Northup's Twelve Years a Slave.

== Biography ==
According to a United States census record, Freeman was born about 1800 in the U.S. state of Georgia. Freeman may have been the son of Daniel Freeman of Jasper County, Georgia, as a Theophilus Freeman is named as a son and heir in Daniel Freeman's will and testament of January 30, 1840. Daniel Freeman was a pensioned veteran of the American Revolutionary War.

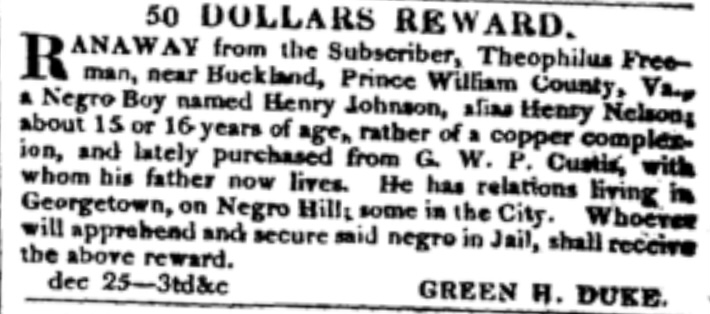
Slavery in the District of Columbia: George Washington Parke Custis, step-grandson of George Washington and father-in-law of Robert E. Lee, sold a teenager named Henry Johnson to Freeman (Washington National Intelligencer, December 28, 1833)

Theophilus Freeman appears in the 1830 census of Prince William County, Virginia—which is just outside the District of Columbia in northern Virginia—with one enslaved man in his household. There was a letter waiting for Theophilus Freeman at the Monticello, Georgia post office in 1831. There was a letter waiting for Freeman at the Augusta, Georgia post office in 1832. In the 1830s, Freeman seems to have been a partner with N. C. Finnall in the trading firm Finnall & Freeman, which exported slaves from the Virginia area to New Orleans for sale. In December 1833, he placed a runaway slave ad in the Washington Intelligencer looking to recover a teenager named Henry Johnson whom he had recently purchased from George Washington Parke Custis (step-grandson of George Washington and father-in-law of Robert E. Lee). Frederic Bancroft found that Freeman was one of the consignees whose name appeared most frequently in records of the coastwise slave trade for 1834–1835. It is through a newspaper ad placed during the period of Freeman's partnership with Benjamin Eaton at the Forks of the Road slave market in Natchez, Mississippi that we know that an early name for that place was Niggerville, "which meant Slaveville, but was more contemptuous." Eaton and Freeman may have remained in partnership until the 1840s.

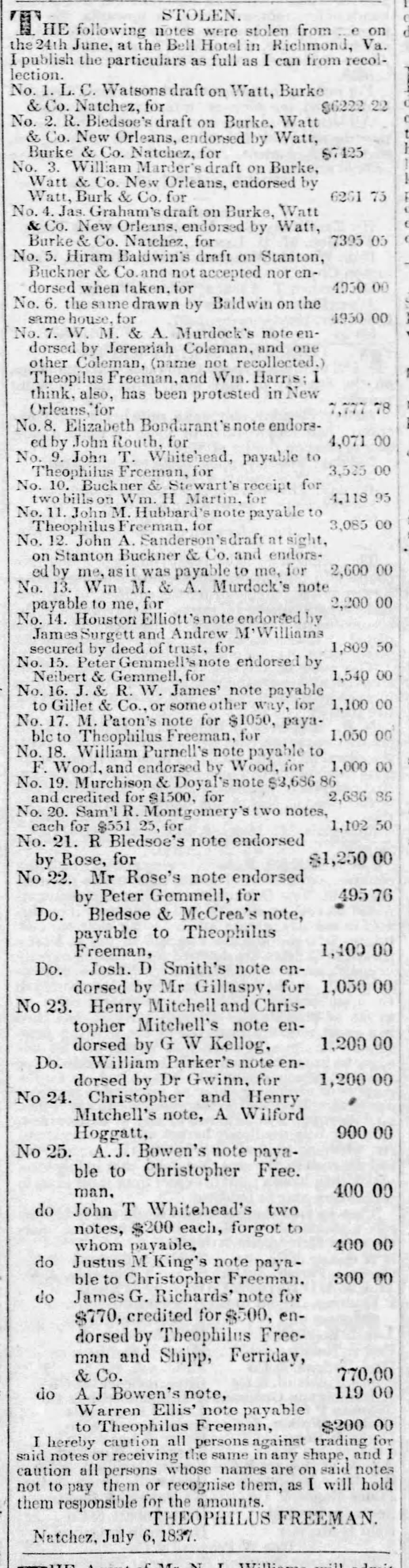
"The following notes were stolen from me on the 24th June, at the Bell hotel in Richmond, Va. I publish the particulars as full as I can from recollection...I hereby caution all persons trading for said notes or receiving the same in any shape, and I caution all persons whose names are on said notes not to pay them or recognise them, as I will hold them responsible for the amounts. THEOPHILUS FREEMAN" The Natchez Weekly Courier, July 7, 1837

According to historian Calvin Schermerhorn, Freeman ran a multi-state slave-trading network beginning the late 1830s. He worked with freelance or contract traders to collect enslaved people from across the Upper South, including in Virginia, Maryland, and North Carolina, and then deliver them to the lower Mississippi River valley, often by way of a shipping company called Haskins & Libby. Once in New Orleans, Freeman and his partner, a cotton merchant named John Goodin, resold the "cargo" to planters and other capitalists of the Delta region. The John Goodin and Theophilus Freeman partnership of the 1840s began August 1, 1842, and was styled John Goodin & Co. and had offices on Poydras in New Orleans at one time. William F. Goodin was their agent in Vicksburg, Mississippi in 1844. The partnership expired and was dissolved on August 1, 1844, in part due to "difficulties existing between the Partners."

Freeman appears in the 1842 city directory of New Orleans, occupation "trader," as one of at least 200 traders operating in the city that year. Also in 1842, the Northern abolitionist newspaper The Liberator published a cache of letters written by and to Theophilus Freeman about his slave-trading business. Excerpts from this tranche of correspondence were later reprinted in William I. Bowditch's Slavery and the Constitution, A Key to Uncle Tom's Cabin, Five Thousand Strokes for Freedom, and an anti-slavery tract by Samuel Wilberforce. The initial publication of three columns of text in The Liberator began as follows:

I bought a boy yesterday, 16 years old, and likely, weighing 110 pounds, at $700, and I sold a likely girl, 12 years old, at $500. I bought a man yesterday, 20 years old, 6 feet high, at $820; one to-day, 24 years old, at $850, black, and sleek as a mole. [Theophilus Freeman; Richmond, Sunday, September 21, 1839] Brother Garrison: This last is an extract from a letter of one who has evidently been largely engaged in trading in slaves and souls of men in Virginia and North Carolina. A large batch of this kind of correspondence, comprising letters, bills of lading, invoices of slaves, has fallen into my hands, which purport to be details of transactions of this kind which took place in 1839–40. Without further comment, I give some of the letters, premising, that as these letters have evidently gone astray, and found their way into a region which they were never designed to see, this notice of them will answer the purpose of an advertisement to their owner, who may, if he please, have them by calling on me at No. 25 Cornhill, Boston. E. SMITH.

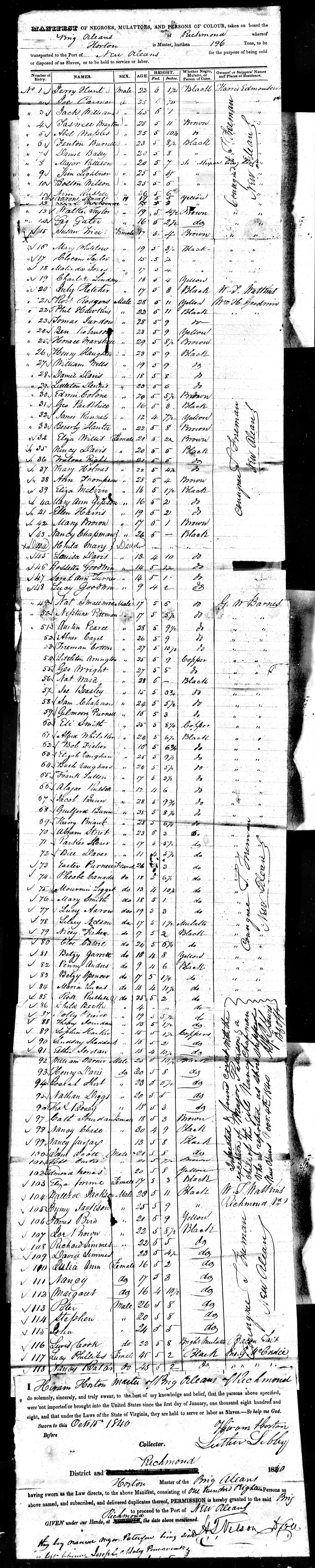
Shipment of 117 enslaved people (see line 44) from Richmond to New Orleans on the brig Orleans, October 14, 1840 to Theophilus Freeman, consignee (New Orleans, Louisiana, U.S., Slave Manifests, 1807–1860, NARA)

In his 1855 memoir dictated from freedom in London, fugitive slave John Brown described Theophilus Freeman's slave jail as home to "three tiers of rooms with heavily barred windows. On the top floor of the building was a 'flogging room' in which obstreperous articles of property might be subdued. Young, handsome female slaves were given a separate room, for they were to be sold for use as concubines. The other slaves were quartered indiscriminately." According to Brown, the pen could hold 500 people and "was usually full." Brown recalled being surprised by the number of people per coffle delivered by slave speculators connected with Freeman, including "Williams from Washington, and Redford and Kelly from Kentucky, and Mac Cargo from Richmond, Virginia."

For his part, Northup characterized Freeman with the sarcastic designation "the very amiable, pious-hearted Mr. Theophilus Freeman."

In recounting the story of Freeman's involvement with a woman named Sarah Conner, historian Alexandra Finley said of Freeman: "...a less reliable narrator is difficult to find...Freeman was willing to do just about anything to protect his economic interests, and this often meant lying to courts, creditors, and customers. He knowingly sold free men of color as slaves, stabbed business partners in the back, and hid assets from creditors." At the time of 1850 census, Freeman lived in a household, likely a boarding house, with several other slave traders and with Sarah Conner.

Freeman was seemingly beset by lawsuits and legal troubles. In 1852 the Natchez Free Trader reported on one of these cases (involving Sarah Conner) and described Freeman as "a celebrated negro-trader who once fixed his head quarters or African harem at the forks of the road Natchez...He has a large fortune, a fortune safely concealed—the lawyers will enjoy the benefits of it."

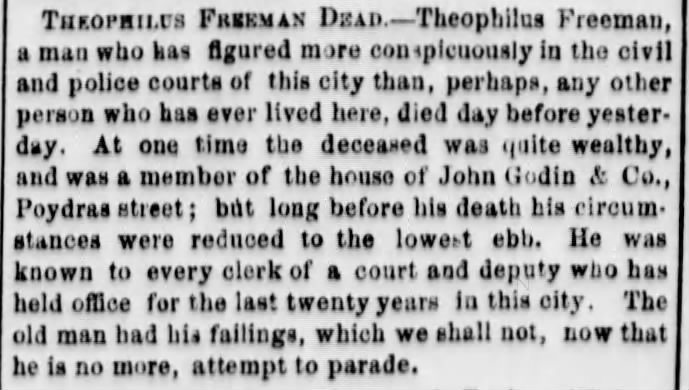
"Theophilus Freeman Dead," The Sunday Delta, May 20, 1860

In 1858 the New Orleans Crescent reported that charges had been dismissed in the case of Theophilus Freeman, who had been "charged with assault and battery on Susan McNally." In April 1860, the New Orleans Daily Delta reported, "Theophilus Freeman, an old, gray-haired fellow, whose reputation is below par, even among the police, was arrested last evening fer drawing a knife upon citizen Dayton Daniels, on Baronne street—It appears that Daniela complained about a row going on in Freeman's house, and a woman calling herself Mrs. Freeman was arrested. It was in consequence of this that Freeman made the assault upon Daniels." Freeman died in poverty in New Orleans on May 18, 1860.

== Bob Freeman ==
Bob Freeman (fl. 1840s–1850s) was a mixed-race man who worked as the jailor of Theophilus Freeman's slave pen in New Orleans, Louisiana, in the antebellum United States. He is described in the slave narratives of both John Brown and Solomon Northrup. Brown spent a fair amount of time accompanying Freeman on errands, such as taking enslaved people to and from the blacksmith to have fetters put on or removed. Northup also encountered this jailor, whom he knew only as Bob.

Both Northup and Brown mention his violin playing and assess it critically. Brown recalled: "Bob, who had a fiddle, used to play up jigs for us to dance to. If we did not dance to his fiddle, we used to have to do so to his whip, so no wonder we used our legs handsomely, though the music was none of the best." Northrup recalled, "Standing near him, I made bold to inquire if he could play the 'Virginia Reel.' He answered he could not, and asked me if I could play. Replying in the affirmative, he handed me the violin. I struck up a tune, and finished it. [Theophilus] Freeman ordered me to continue playing, and seemed well pleased, telling Bob that I far excelled him—a remark that seemed to grieve my musical companion very much."

== In popular culture ==
- J. Don Ferguson played the role of Freeman in the 1984 telefilm Solomon Northup's Odyssey.
- Paul Giamatti played the role of Theophilus Freeman in 12 Years a Slave, the 2013 film adaptation of Northup's memoir.

== See also ==
- List of American slave traders
- Slave trade in the United States
- History of slavery in Louisiana
- History of slavery in Mississippi
- History of slavery in Virginia
