= Frithland =

- U.S. National Register of Historic Places
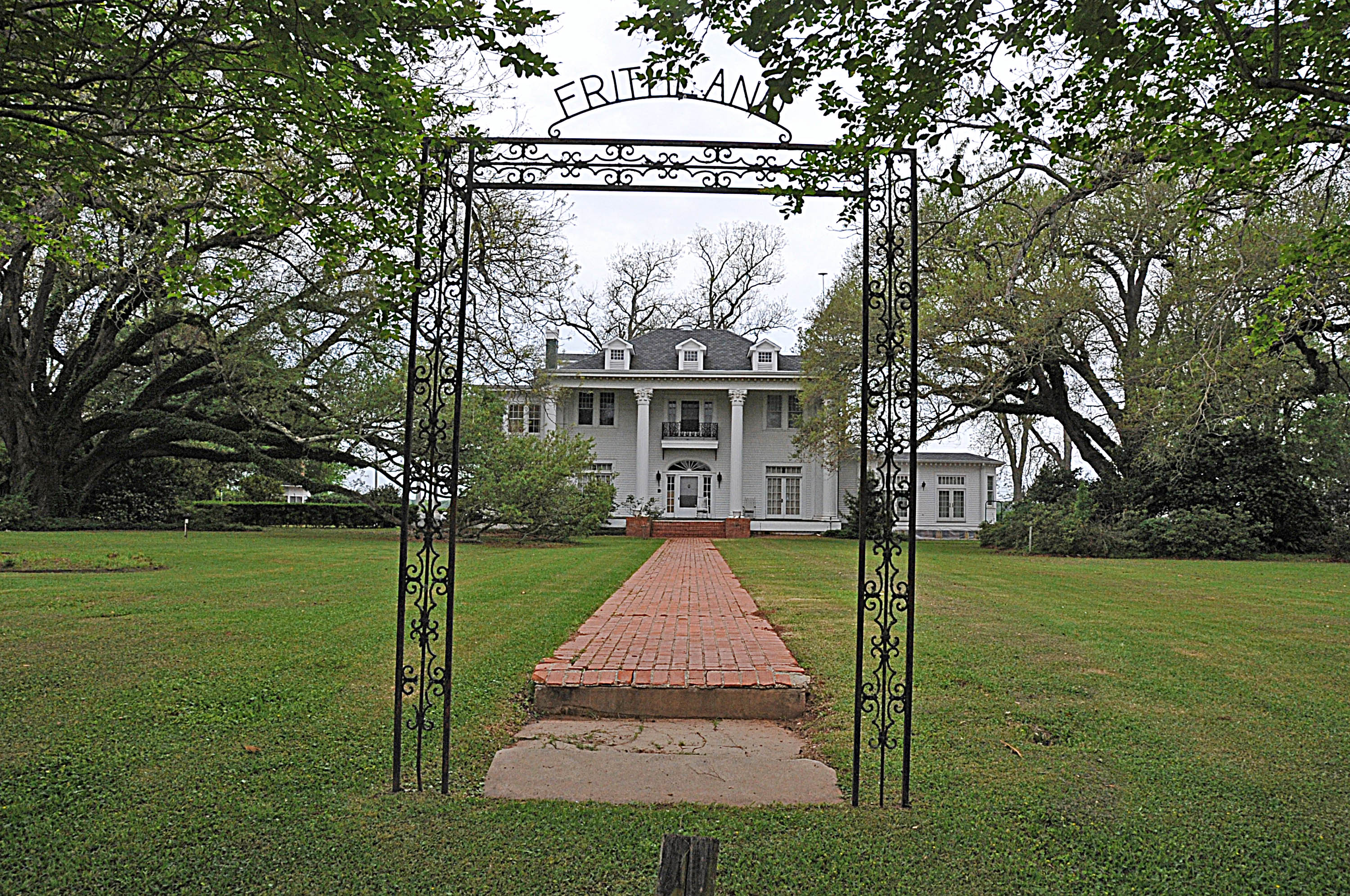

- Location within Louisiana
- Nearest city: Bunkie, Louisiana
- Coordinates: 30°56′19″N 92°11′27″W
- Area: 4 acres (1.6 ha)
- Built: 1919
- Built by: Alfred E. Dupuy
- Architectural style: Colonial Revival
- NRHP reference No.: 85000969
- Added to NRHP: May 9, 1985

Frithland is a large Colonial Revival-style house built in 1919 near Bunkie, Louisiana in Avoyelles Parish, Louisiana. It was listed on the National Register of Historic Places in 1985.

The house was built for the Frith family, among the earliest settlers in the area of Bunkie; it is the third Frith home on the Frithland Plantation.

It is a 2 1/2-story, frame house with "a monumental gallery featuring colossal, fluted, composite order columns and end pilasters" across nearly the entire front of the house. It has a nearly full entablature, a balustrade, and a hipped roof with three front-facing dormer windows. Over the main entrance is a small balcony with French doors. The original building central hall plan with a rear ell.

A second contributing building is included in the listing.

It is located along Bayou Huffpower on Louisiana Highway 29, about 1.1 miles (1.8 km) south of Bunkie.
