= Solomon Northup's Odyssey =

1984 American television film by Gordon Parks

- Based on: Twelve Years a Slave by Solomon Northup
- Written by: Lou Potter; Samm-Art Williams
- Directed by: Gordon Parks
- Starring: Avery Brooks
- Theme music composer: Gordon Parks
- Country of origin: United States
- Original language: English

Production
- Producer: Yanna Kroyt Brandt
- Cinematography: Hiro Narita
- Editor: John Carter
- Running time: 118 minutes
- Production companies: The Fremantle Corporation; Past America Inc.

Original release
- Network: PBS
- Release: December 10, 1984

Solomon Northup's Odyssey, reissued as Half Slave, Half Free, is a 1984 American television film based on the 1853 autobiography Twelve Years a Slave by Solomon Northup, a free black man who in 1841 was kidnapped and sold into slavery. The film, which aired on PBS, was directed by Gordon Parks with Avery Brooks starring as the titular character. It was the second film to be funded by the National Endowment for the Humanities, following A House Divided: Denmark Vesey's Rebellion in 1982. Parks returned to direct the film after years of absence. He chose to work in the Deep South and to collaborate with a crew of mixed races. The film first aired on PBS on December 10, 1984, and as part of PBS's American Playhouse anthology television series in the following year. It was released on video under the title Half Slave, Half Free.

Solomon Northup's Odyssey was the first film adaptation of Twelve Years a Slave. A second film adaptation, 12 Years a Slave, was released in 2013.

== Synopsis ==
Solomon Northup's Odyssey is based on the true story of Solomon Northup, a free black man in Saratoga, New York, who was kidnapped in 1841 and sold into slavery (see slavery in the United States). Northup was intelligent, skilled in carpentry, and was able to play music. He was enslaved in the state of Louisiana for 12 years before he was released.

== Cast ==
- Avery Brooks as Solomon Northup
- Loretta Greene as Jenny (credited as Rhetta Green)
- Petronia Paley as Anne
- Joe Seneca as Noah
- Art Evans as Walton
- Lee Bryant as Mrs. Epps
- John Saxon as Mr. Epps
- J.C. Quinn as Tibeats
- Mason Adams as Ford
- J. Don Ferguson as Freeman
- Michael Tolan as Henry Northup
- Janet League as Eliza
- Jay McMillian as Harry

== Production ==
Solomon Northup's Odyssey is directed by Gordon Parks, who also composed the film score with Kermit Moore. The television film is based on the autobiography Twelve Years a Slave by Solomon Northup. Lou Potter and Samm-Art Williams wrote the teleplay for the film. The film was produced by The Fremantle Corporation and Past America Inc.

The National Endowment for the Humanities provided funding for a series of programs related to American history. Producer Shep Morgan received a planning grant from the NEH in 1976 and sought input from historians including Robert B. Toplin who suggested the topic of American slavery. When the miniseries Roots was aired in 1977, the team was forced to argue to some television executives that there was more to say about American slavery. The first film in the series was A House Divided: Denmark Vesey's Rebellion, about Denmark Vesey, who planned a slave rebellion. The film was aired on PBS in 1982, and Solomon Northup's Odyssey was the next to be produced. Toplin said, "While we hoped the Vesey show would throw light on questions about slave insurrections, we designed the Northup film to address questions about life in bondage." Toplin said the film in particular corrected the tendency of Roots and similar media "to portray almost all slaveholders as insensitive exploiters". Toplin described the various portrayals, "[It] showed an African American working under three different masters. One was a kindly individual whose good intentions were undermined by the slave system. A second master was a vicious, poorly educated individual who was jealous of Northup's intelligence and skills. The third respected Northup but drove him hard nevertheless in order to maximize profits on his plantation."

Gordon Parks was approached to direct the film, and though he was disillusioned by his experience with the release of his 1976 feature film Leadbelly, he anticipated a different experience in television. After not having directed a film in years, he returned to adapt the autobiography. The script mostly followed Northup's autobiography, though Parks had to change some parts. Parks said, "Solomon was very tolerant in a terrible situation, and very fair in his reporting. I tried to remain fair in my reporting and not go overboard, although it's very difficult not to when you know so much happened that was so bad to so many people. But there were things I had to change." Five historical advisers assisted with the film, though Parks said he felt pressured "to keep it toned down".

Parks chose to film in areas of the Deep South where Northup labored in slavery. The director sought to have a crew of mixed races, he said "perhaps to show the Southerners how Blacks and Whites could work together". In his memoir, Parks recalled the mix: Japanese American cinematographer Hiro Narita, a black producer and assistant director, a mostly white crew, and a black costume lady who was assisted by a woman from Hong Kong. He filmed Solomon Northup's Odyssey in three weeks' time in Savannah, Georgia. Parks said of the final product, "I can't say I don't like the film; I think it's a powerful film, but it could have been stronger. But you meet that sort of crisis on every film; there are some sort of compromises you always have to make."

== Contemporary release ==
Solomon Northup's Odyssey first aired on PBS on December 10, 1984. It aired again as part of the PBS anthology television series American Playhouse on February 13, 1985. The film was released on video in 1985 as Half Slave, Half Free. Ebony said the film had the second-largest "Black viewership of any PBS show", following Denmark Vesey's Rebellion. The magazine said Solomon Northup's Odyssey at the time of airing "has been praised by critics who are calling for a theater release as well". John Corry of The New York Times said of the film, "It gives us an earnest and intelligent depiction, although its real subject—the moral effect of slavery—stays just out of reach. It is almost as if the drama's good taste is keeping it at bay." Corry said the direction obeying the "fidelity of history" made the setting and the society less harsh: "It is not meant this way, but an intolerable institution is made to look almost benign." He commended the performances of Brooks, Green, Saxon, and Seneca and concluded, "[The film] is informative, but whatever else it is, it is not dull."

Film critic Gene Siskel, writing for the Chicago Tribune, said Solomon Northup's Odyssey was "beautifully filmed" with Parks's past experience as a photographer. Siskel also commended Brooks for portraying Northup "with nobility and humanity". Jeff Jarvis, reviewing for People, said the film was made "with remarkable restraint". Jarvis said, "It is teary stuff. But because Parks and Brooks do not go overboard, they manage to make their picture of slavery seem real. Their show... is extraordinarily effective and moving." Author Alan J. Singer wrote that "Solomon Northup's Odyssey... is a much more accurate picture of plantation life and work" than the miniseries Roots (1977), which he said had a soap opera quality and that "enslaved Africans are rarely shown working". For the film, Past America, Inc. received the Erik Barnouw Award from the Organization of American Historians.

== Legacy and subsequent releases ==
The National Endowment for the Humanities wrote in 2016, "The [1984] film helped push one of the darkest periods from America’s past into public consciousness, paving the way for such later movies as Amistad [in 1997], Django Unchained [in 2012], and the most recent adaptation of Northup's memoir... 12 Years a Slave [in 2013], which was lauded for its realistic portrayal of the horror of slavery."

When Steve McQueen's adaptation 12 Years a Slave was released, ColorLines noted the obscurity of Solomon Northup's Odyssey, "With limited funding, and predating social media, the film came and went with little fanfare." The blog Vulture under the magazine New York compared the film to 12 Years a Slave, "As a made-for-TV movie from the mid-eighties, [Solomon Northup's Odyssey] had a very modest budget and could never come close to the brutality of McQueen's film. Yet Parks's film is beautiful in its own right, lacking the ferocious immediacy of McQueen's work, but containing a somber lyricism that's hard to shake. The outrage is still there, just more muted and given more historical context."

By 2013, when 12 Years a Slave was released, Vulture said of the 1984 film, "Out-of-print videos of it sell for a lot of money nowadays," and that the film was available for streaming online.

IndieCollect, a film preservation organization, uncovered an original negative of Solomon Northup's Odyssey from DuArt Film and Video's vault. The company Colorlab created a new print from the negative, and the U.S. National Archives and Records Administration hosted a one-time screening of the new print on May 20, 2014 before IndieCollect donated the print to the Library of Congress for safekeeping.

The Criterion Collection featured Solomon Northup's Odyssey, along with other works by Gordon Parks, on its Criterion Channel in February 2021.

== See also ==
- List of films featuring slavery
- Edwin Epps, Northup's enslaver
