= A House Divided: Denmark Vesey's Rebellion =

1982 film by Stan Lathan

- Written by: William Thornton Hauptman; Robert Brent Toplin
- Directed by: Stan Lathan
- Starring: Yaphet Kotto; Ned Beatty; Bernie Casey; Antonio Fargas; Cleavon Little
- Country of origin: United States
- Original language: English

Production
- Cinematography: Larry Pizer
- Editors: John Carter; Paul L. Evans
- Running time: 90 minutes
- Production companies: WPBT; PBS

Original release
- Network: PBS
- Release: February 17, 1982

A House Divided: Denmark Vesey's Rebellion is a 1982 television film about Denmark Vesey, a literate skilled carpenter and former slave who planned a slave rebellion in 1822 in Charleston, South Carolina. Denmark Vesey's Rebellion was produced by WPBT and PBS, and Yaphet Kotto played Vesey.

== Synopsis ==
Denmark Vesey is a former slave in Charleston, South Carolina who has been free for 20 years after buying his freedom. He is literate and a skilled carpenter, one of the founders of an AME church in the city. In 1822 he decides to organize a slave rebellion. Authorities discover the plan and arrest Vesey and many others before the rebellion is carried out, quickly convicting and executing them in secret proceedings.

== Production ==
A House Divided: Denmark Vesey's Rebellion is directed by Stan Lathan based on a teleplay written by William Thornton Hauptman. The television film was produced by WPBT in Miami, Florida. Filming took place in Charleston, South Carolina. The film was produced by Shep Morgan and partially funded by the National Endowment for the Humanities. An advisory board of scholars helped ensure the film's historical accuracy.

== Reception ==
Ebony said the film "drew the largest Black viewership of any PBS show".

Richard F. Shepard of The New York Times said, "This 90-minute play... gives us a colorful and apparently well-researched account of the incident." Shepard said Kotto "set the tone" as Vesey as "a large and impressive man, absolutely dedicated to his purpose" and with speaking "in quiet voice, sometimes too soft for the high drama he launches". The critic said, "The play does not give us unvarnished villains and heroes, black or white," and he concluded, "'Denmark Vesey's Rebellion'... is a sound and absorbing work that acquits itself with distinction as both history and drama."

People said, "Neither [Yapher Kotto] nor co-stars Cleavon Little and Ned Beatty can unshackle this plodding drama."

Douglas R. Egerton, author of a 2004 biography of Denmark Vesey, said, "PBS produced a moving television drama... featuring the charismatic—if then too youthful—Caribbean-born actor Yaphet Kotto as the aged revolutionary."

== See also ==
- List of films featuring slavery
