= Charles W. DeWitt Jr. =

American politician

Speaker of the Louisiana House of Representatives
- In office 2000–2004
- Preceded by: Hunt Downer
- Succeeded by: Joe R. Salter

Personal details
- Born: February 4, 1947 (age 79)
- Party: Democratic
- Profession: Cattle rancher, politician

Charles W. DeWitt Jr. (born February 4, 1947) is a politician from Louisiana, United States. He served in the Louisiana House of Representatives beginning in 1979. He served as Speaker of the Louisiana House of Representatives starting in January 2000, marking him as the first individual from Rapides Parish to hold the position. DeWitt, a member of the Democratic Party, began his political career on the Rapides Parish Police Jury before being elected to the Louisiana House in 1979.

== Political career ==
DeWitt's political career started with his service on the Rapides Parish Police Jury, followed by his election to the Louisiana House of Representatives in 1979. He was elected as Speaker of the House in January 2000, during which he was instrumental in promoting significant educational reforms, including the upgrading of LSU-Alexandria from a two-year to a four-year institution.

In addition to his role in the state legislature, DeWitt briefly served on the Louisiana Public Service Commission in 2016, filling the unexpired term of Clyde Holloway, who died unexpectedly.
