= Sue Eakin =

Louisiana historian

- Born: Myrtle Sue Lyles; December 7, 1918 near Cheneyville, Louisiana, U.S.
- Died: September 17, 2009 (aged 90); Bunkie, Louisiana

Academic background
- Education: Louisiana State University (BA, MA); University of Southwestern Louisiana (PhD)
- Thesis: The Black Struggle for Education in Louisiana, 1877–1930s (1980)

Academic work
- Discipline: Historian
- Sub-discipline: Louisiana history
- Institutions: Louisiana State University of Alexandria

Sue Eakin (1918–2009) was an American history professor at Louisiana State University of Alexandria. She received a National Endowment for the Humanities Fellowship and was made a Fellow of American Association of University Women. Eakin researched the story of Solomon Northup, Twelve Years a Slave, and published a version of the book that corrected historical inaccuracies.

== Personal life ==
Myrtle Sue Lyles was born on December 7, 1918, to Mary Myrtle Guy and Samuel Pickels Lyles. She was born just north of Cheneyville, Louisiana, in Lyles or Loyd Bridge. Her maternal and paternal families were early settlers in antebellum Avoyelles Parish, Louisiana. When she was 12, she went to a plantation and was given Twelve Years a Slave written by Solomon Northup to read while her father visited with the owner. She was fascinated by the story.

In 1941, she married Paul Mechlin Eakin from Pittsburgh, Pennsylvania, and they settled in Bunkie, Louisiana. They had five children, Russell, Paul, Sara, Sam, and Frank.

== Education ==
Eakin graduated from Lecompte High School, as well as Louisiana State University (LSU).

She began commuting to LSU at the age of 42 to earn her master's degrees. Eakin was awarded a fellowship by the American Association of University Women and received a master's degree in history from LSU in 1964. Her thesis was about Solomon Northup. The next year, she was awarded a degree in journalism. She received a doctorate in history in 1980 from the University of Southwestern Louisiana.

== Career ==
Eakin was a freelance journalist, columnist, and photojournalist. She wrote for Alexandria Daily Town Talk, the New Orleans Times-Picayune, and the column "Bunkie Main Street" for the Opelousas Daily World. She contributed to the History of St. Landry Parish in 1955, edited by Ruth Fontenot. Eakin and her husband published the Bunkie Record from 1957 to 1959. During that time, she had a weekly column at the paper.

She began her career as a history professor at the Louisiana State University of Alexandria in 1965. She received the LSU Foundation Distinguished Faculty Award. Eakin was a professor for LSU for 25 years. During that time, she had a number of research projects.

Eakin authored history books—particularly about events in the Avoyelles Parish, Louisiana—and school textbooks. She was particularly interested in history of plantation life.

A team including Sue Eakins researched Northup's book Twelve Years A Slave for accuracy in the 1960s. As part of the research, she found the house that Northup built, the Edwin Epps House. Over 150 years, storms and time had decayed the original house. She co-authored the revised version of the book with Joseph Logsdon of the University of New Orleans that was published in 1968.

I felt that Solomon Northup was my sibling... Solomon was always in our household, so to speak. I remember going to courthouses with her [my mother], tagging along where she would get documentation, interviewing people, descendants of the characters mentioned in the original narrative and all that. Solomon was a big part of our family.

— Eakin's son, Frank, who was 7 when the book was published.

Eakin worked to save the Edwin Epps House that belonged to Northup's enslaver. The house is now at LSU-Alexandria. The musical play that she wrote about Twelve Years a Slave has been performed in the Bunkie area for years.

She co-founded La Commission des Avoyelles and authored and edited Avoyelles Crossroads. With Normand Ferachi, she co-authored Vanishing Louisiana. Her husband provided the photographs for the book. She authored An Illustrated History of Rapides Parish. She wrote other books and text books about the history of Louisiana, including Louisiana: The Land and Its People the she wrote with her sister, Manie Culberton. She promoted historical preservation throughout the state.

In 1972, she received a National Endowment for the Humanities Fellowship. In 1985 she researched outstanding Blacks of Louisiana and was made a Fellow of American Association of University Women. Over her career, she received a number of honors and awards.

== Later years and death ==
After she retired, she continued to write about history. In 2007 she published her definitive version of Twelve Years a Slave, which benefited from source information made available over the previous 40 years.

She died at her home in Bunkie, Louisiana, on September 17, 2009. Funeral services were held at the Trinity Episcopal Church in Cheneyville. She was interred at the church cemetery.
