= David McCandless =

British writer and data journalist

David McCandless (born 1971) is a British data-journalist, writer, and information designer.

== Career ==
McCandless began his career writing for video, gaming and computer magazines such as Your Sinclair, PC Zone, and PC Format from the late 1980s until the early 2000s. In 1995, McCandless published the trivia-based book TrekMaster (based on Star Trek). After the 1990s, he went on to work for The Guardian and Wired.

McCandless eventually created the visual blog Information Is Beautiful, followed by a book of the same name. Early explorations into the synergy between data visualisation and his work as a journalist led to the development of Information Is Beautiful and the subsequent publication of his book of the same name (titled A Visual Miscellaneum in the United States). Since the publication of Information Is Beautiful in 2009, his information design work has appeared in numerous publications, including The Guardian, Wired, and Die Zeit, and has also been showcased at the Museum of Modern Art in New York, the Wellcome Trust gallery in London, and at the Tate Britain. Another book, Knowledge Is Beautiful, was published in 2014. It was followed by Beautiful News in 2023.

== Bibliography ==
- TrekMaster (1995)
- Information Is Beautiful (2009)
- Knowledge Is Beautiful (2014)
- Beautiful News (2023)
