= William Prince Ford =

American Baptist minister, preacher, and planter (1803 – 1866)

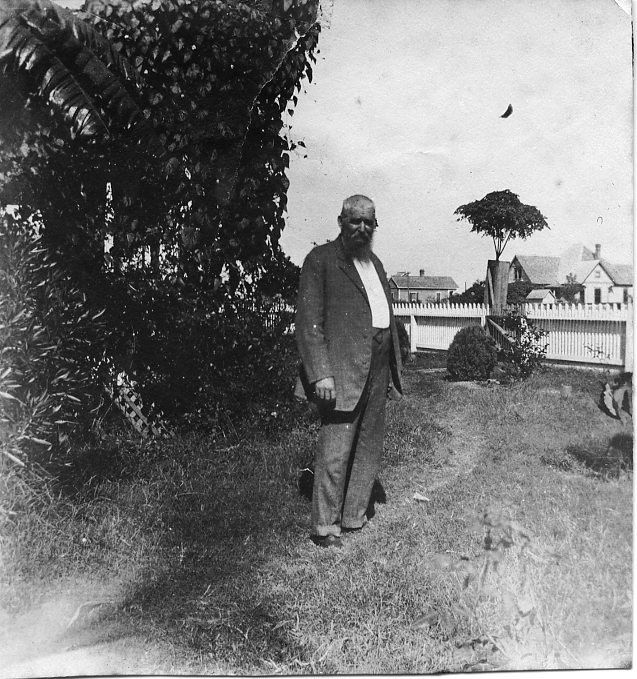
- Born: January 15, 1803
- Died: August 23, 1866 (aged 63)
- Occupations: Preacher and planter

William Prince Ford (January 15, 1803 – August 23, 1866) was an American Baptist minister, preacher, and slaveholder in pre–Civil War Louisiana.

Ford was the enslaver who first bought Solomon Northup, a free African-American, after Northup was kidnapped in the District of Columbia, and sold in New Orleans in 1841. Ford resided in the "Great Pine Woods", Avoyelles, Red River Parish, Louisiana, and ran a farm there. At the same year, Ezra Bennett, a Bayou Boeuf storekeeper and planter, lived near the plantation of Prince Ford and gave him instructions to his factors.

After selling Northup to another enslaver, Ford, in 1843, converted with most of his Baptist congregation to the Disciples of Christ, to which Ford had become influenced by the writings of Alexander Campbell. Campbell visited the congregation in 1857 and was impressed by the fellowship between blacks and whites. As of 2014, the congregation continued as the Cheneyville Christian Church. It is the oldest congregation associated with the Restoration Movement in Louisiana.

== Biography ==
William Prince Ford was born in 1803. Ford was a pioneer planter of the Cheneyville area, and was among the first recipients of a land patent from the United States in southwestern Louisiana. Ford was also a dedicated Baptist minister associated with the Beulah Baptist Church in Cheneyville and the Springhill Baptist Church.

His letters reflect a particularly God-fearing, righteous man who was quite articulate.

Ford was a principal in a doctrinal quarrel over predestination among Cheneyville Baptists in the 1840s. Ford was finally expelled from Springhill Baptist Church as a heretic for, among other reasons, allowing a Methodist to take communion in the church.

In 1841, William Prince Ford purchased Solomon Northup at an auction in New Orleans, Louisiana. In Saratoga Springs, Solomon Northup worked as a plumber, helping William Prince Ford with the lumber mill. Northup showed Ford how to build rafts from pine trees they cut and how to tie the pines together to float on the water. Solomon Northup wanted to build a mill on the banks of Indian Creek, so William Prince Ford helped him. Despite this, the farm still lost money; Ford accumulated more debt and finally sold Northup.

== Popular culture ==
Mason Adams played Ford in the 1984 TV film Solomon Northup's Odyssey.

In the 2013 feature film 12 Years a Slave, Ford was portrayed by Benedict Cumberbatch. Some of Ford's descendants have objected to the portrayal in the film as rendering Ford as a "pompous hypocrite; a weak-willed man unable to protect Northup and his fellow slaves from sadistic overseers in the cotton fields," in contrast to Northup's description of Ford as a humane man: "There never was a more kind, noble, candid Christian man than William Ford."

== Bibliography ==
- McCarthy, Tom (2017). Weird Disappearances: Real Tales of Missing People. Nomad Press. p. 128. ISBN 9781619305281.
- Zender, Karl F. (2008). Shakespeare, Midlife, and Generativity. LSU Press. p. 184. ISBN 9780807101506.
