= Joseph Logsdon =

American historian

- Born: March 12, 1938; Chicago, Illinois
- Died: June 2, 1999 (aged 61); Jefferson, Louisiana
- Education: University of Wisconsin–Madison; University of Chicago
- Scientific career
- Fields: History of the Southern United States
- Workplaces: University of New Orleans

Joseph Logsdon (March 12, 1938 – June 2, 1999) was an American historian. He was a professor at the University of New Orleans. Logsdon is known for his collaboration with Sue Eakin on a 1968 scholarly edition of Twelve Years a Slave.

A Chicago native, Logsdon got his bachelor's and master's degrees from the University of Chicago and a doctorate from the University of Wisconsin–Madison in the 1960s.

Logsdon died on June 2, 1999, at Ochsner Medical Center in Jefferson, Louisiana.
