= James Cephas Derby =

American book publisher (1818-1892)

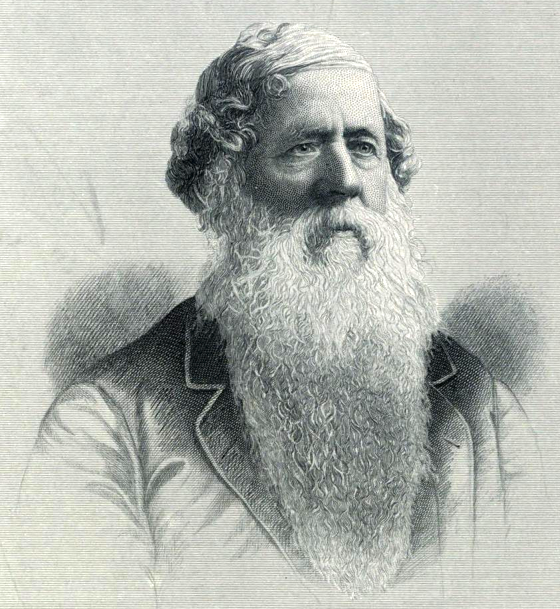
- Portrait of J.C. Derby, circa 1884, engraved by G.E. Perine
- Born: July 20, 1818; Little Falls, New York, United States
- Died: September 22, 1892 (aged 74); Brooklyn, New York City, United States
- Occupation: Book publisher
- Spouse: Lavanchie White Fitch (m. 1841)
- Children: 8

James Cephas Derby (1818–1892) was an American book publisher in New York state.

== Biography ==
James Cephas Derby was born in Little Falls, New York on July 20, 1818.

He created several business partnerships which issued works by Thomas Bailey Aldrich, Henry Ward Beecher, Alice and Phoebe Cary, Margaret C. Conkling, Augusta Jane Evans, Fanny Fern, Samuel Griswold Goodrich, Josiah Hopkins, Solomon Northup, William H. Seward, Mary Virginia Terhune, Catherine Anne Warfield, and others. A Republican Party activist, he served under Secretary Seward in the Department of State for the Lincoln administration. He also helped organize the American portion of the 1867 International Exposition in Paris.

He married Lavanchie White Fitch in 1841, and they had eight children.

He died at his daughter's home in Brooklyn on September 22, 1892.

== Publishing firms ==
- J.C. Derby & Co., Auburn, New York. Established circa 1844 by Derby and H. Ivison Jr.
- Derby & Miller, Auburn, New York, 1848-1852. Established by Derby and Norman C. Miller.
- Derby, Miller & Co., Auburn, New York
- Derby, Orton and Mulligan, Buffalo, New York. Established in 1852 by Derby, William Orton, and Eugene Mulligan.
- Derby & Jackson, New York City, 1855-1861. Established by Derby and Edwin Jackson.
- Derby & Miller, New York City. Re-established in 1862 by Derby and Norman C. Miller. Re-established once again in 1890 for the publication of the three volume biography of William H. Seward.
