= Edwin Epps =

American slave owner (1808-1867)

- Born: 1808; North Carolina, U.S.
- Died: March 3, 1867 (aged 58-59); Avoyelles Parish, Louisiana, U.S.

Edwin Epps (1808 – March 3, 1867) was an American slave owner who owned a cotton plantation in Avoyelles Parish, Louisiana. Epps was the third and longest enslaver of Solomon Northup, who was kidnapped in Washington, D.C., in 1841 and forced into slavery. On January 3, 1853, Northup left Epps's property and returned to his family in New York.

== Personal life ==
Edwin Epps was born in North Carolina around 1808. By 1843, Epps married Mary Elvira Robert, with whom he had seven children: John (b. c. 1843), Edwin (b. c. 1846), Robert (b. c. 1849), Virginia (b. c. 1851), Mary (b. c. 1853), Wilbur (b. c. 1855), and Massa (b. c. 1858). The eldest, John, was not living with the family in 1860.

== Overseer and enslaver ==
Epps was an overseer on the Oakland Plantation (now the site of Louisiana State University of Alexandria). When Archy P. Williams, the plantation's owner, could not pay Epps, he transferred eight slaves and some money for lost wages. Epps then purchased 325.5 acres in Holmesville, Avoyelles Parish, Louisiana. The eight enslaved people included a family of five, a single man, and a woman named Patsey who came from a single plantation in Williamsburg County, South Carolina.

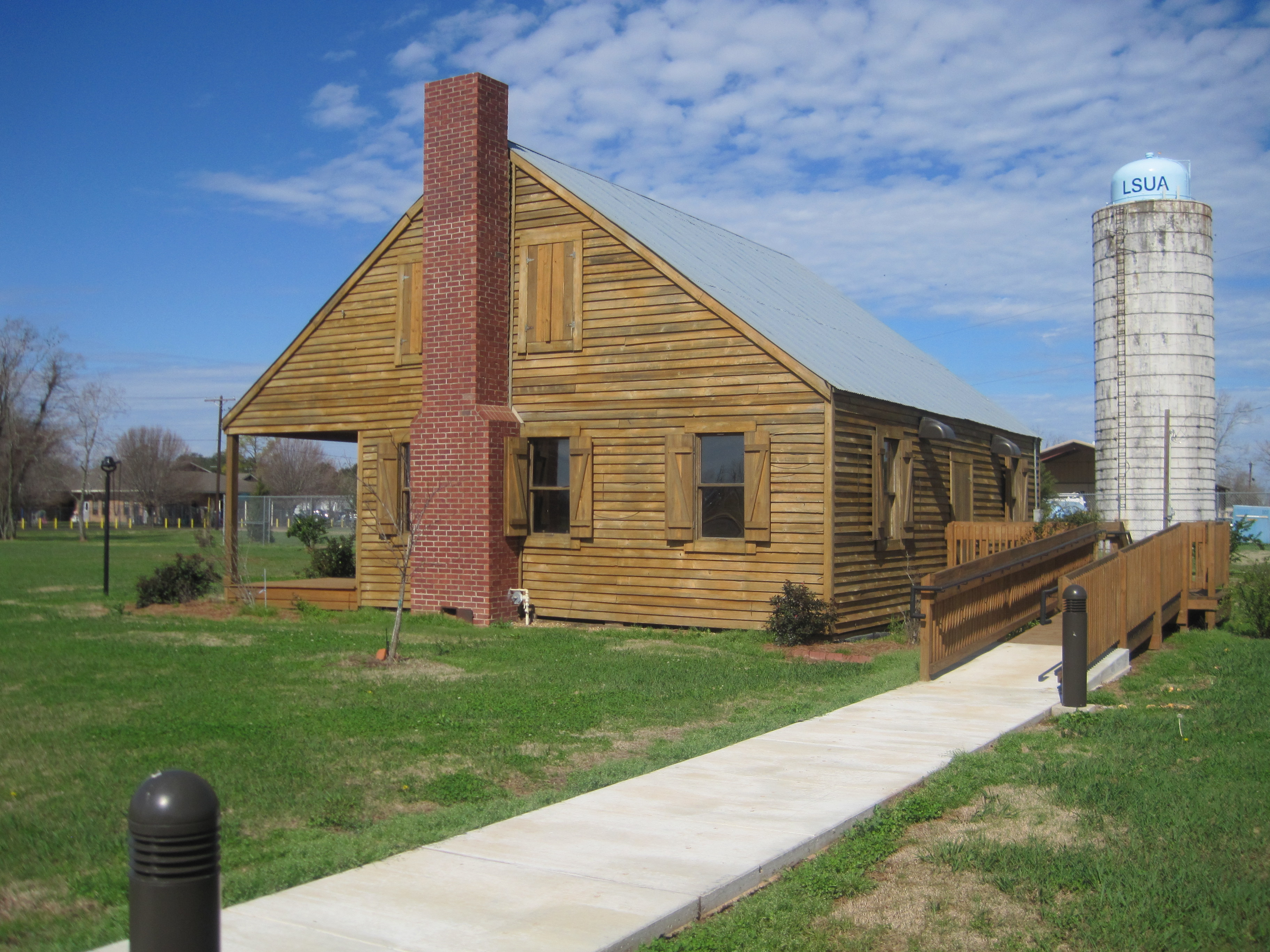
Restored Epps plantation house. Now located on the Louisiana State University of Alexandria campus

Epps settled in Avoyelles Parish, Louisiana, in the mid-1840s. At that time, frontier land opened up through the Louisiana Purchase, where Epps and other planters made money growing cotton. Epps initially leased land from his wife's paternal uncle and later purchased a farm. The former overseer never attained the status of the planter class, who would have had more land and more than 50 slaves. Epps had a violent temper and was an alcoholic, who went on two-week long "sprees" in which he might enjoy dancing with or whipping his slaves.

Epps also enslaved Solomon Northup, who had been renamed "Platt" after he had been kidnapped into slavery. Northup wrote the story in the memoir entitled Twelve Years a Slave. Northup and a Canadian carpenter, Samuel Bass, worked together on the modest plantation, Edwin Epps House. Bass wrote letters to Northup's friends in New York, leading to his freedom.

Women on Epps's property worked as hard as the men. Both men and women were beaten and whipped. Northup, with the position of overseer, was expected to mete out whippings to other slaves. An enslaved woman, Celeste, resisted being whipped by hiding out in the swamp for three months. Patsey, who left the farm to get a small bar of soap from a neighboring plantation, was beaten brutally. Epps's wife, Mary, had denied Patsey the use of soap because she was jealous of Patsey, whom Epps regularly raped. Epps was violent in his treatment of Patsey, inflicting "life-threatening whippings" on her.

Epps...wanted to own Patsey's body unconditionally. She had to work harder than anyone else in his cotton fields by day, permit his sexual satisfaction at night, and yield to his barbaric whippings upon his, or his wife's, whims.

In 1850, Epps owned six men and two women from the ages of 11 to 40. In 1860, Epps owned eight enslaved men and four women from the ages of 15 to 65.

Mary made the enslaved women on their property feel that she was their superior. She was particularly incensed that her husband raped Patsey. She doggedly insisted that Epps sell Patsey.

== Popular culture ==
- John Saxon played Epps in the 1984 TV film Solomon Northup's Odyssey.
- Michael Fassbender played Epps in the 2013 film 12 Years a Slave. He was nominated for Best Supporting Actor at the Oscars.

== Sources ==
- Northup, Solomon (1853). Twelve Years a Slave: Narrative of Solomon Northup, a Citizen of New-York, Kidnapped in Washington City in 1841, and Rescued in 1853.
- Stevenson, Brenda E. (2014). "12 Years a Slave: Narrative, History and Film". The Journal of African American History. 99 (1–2): 110–118. doi:10.5323/jafriamerhist.99.1-2.0106. ISSN 1548-1867. JSTOR 10.5323/jafriamerhist.99.1-2.0106. S2CID 96500495.
