= David Fiske =

American author and local historian

David Fiske (February 24, 1954 – October 28, 2023) was an American author and local historian. He wrote several books related to Solomon Northup.

== Early life and education ==
Born in Bangor, Maine in 1954, Fiske grew up in Connecticut. He received his bachelor's degree from Cornell University. He studied library science at the University at Albany, SUNY, where he received his master's degree.

== Death ==
Fiske died on October 28, 2023, after a battle with cancer.

== Author ==
He has authored books about a free black man who was kidnapped and enslaved during the antebellum period. He was a co-author of Solomon Northup: The Complete Story of the Author of Twelve Years a Slave with Rachel Seligman, a Skidmore College curator and Clifford Brown, a Union College professor. and he authored Solomon Northup: His Life Before and After Slavery

He wrote another book about more people who were kidnapped and sold into slavery entitled Solomon Northup's Kindred: The Kidnapping of Free Citizens before the Civil War. The book also explains the kidnapping phenomenon of the antebellum U. S.

A key question about Northup is what happened to him after a scheduled lecture in 1857 in Streetsville, Mississauga in Ontario. There was a crowd of people who disrupted his talk and yelled obscenities at him. A local paper said at the time that it was a "Most Dastardly Outrage". Northup locked himself in a room. Fiske's research has led him to a couple of theories. One, for which there is evidence in the form of letters, is that Northup became an Underground Railroad operator, helping people make it into Canada from Vermont. He is said to have helped freedom seekers and worked on the Underground Railroad. Fiske said "given his tendency to boldness and reasoned solutions to problems, there may have been impressive accomplishments… that we simply do not know about."

With Eric Stanway, he wrote Madame Sherri: The Special Edition. He also authored Forgotten on the Kennebec: Abandoned Places and Quirky People. He also lectured on various historical topics.
