= Slavery in the United States =

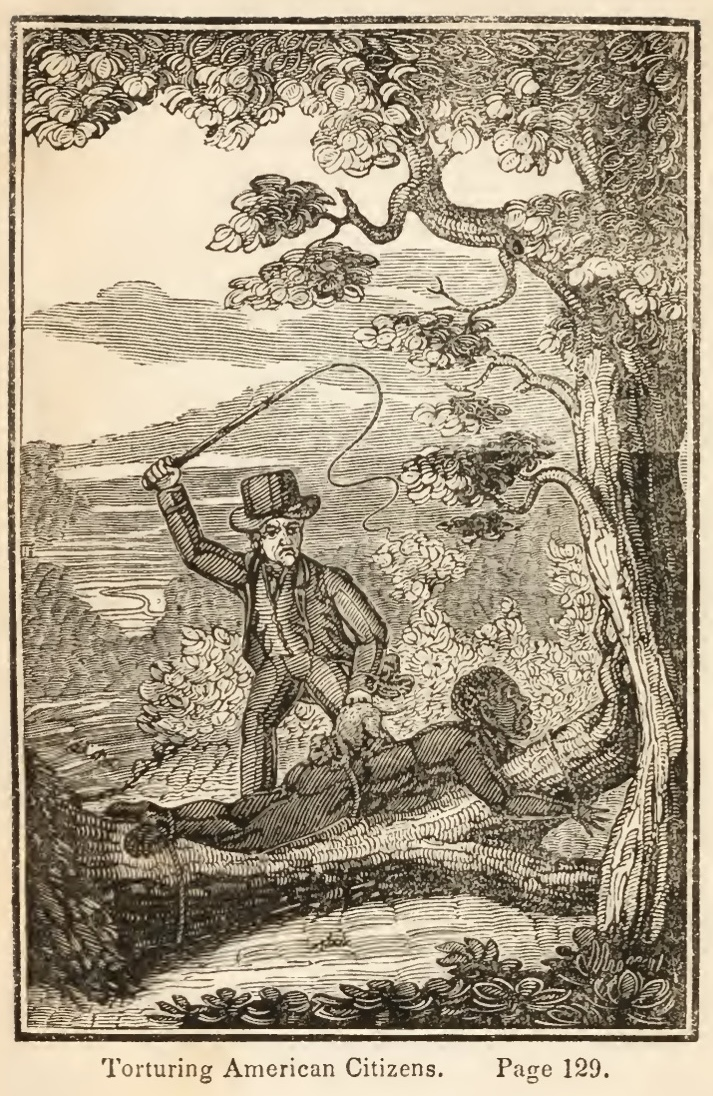
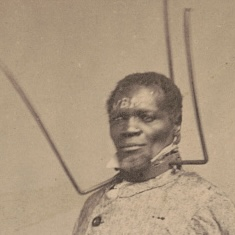
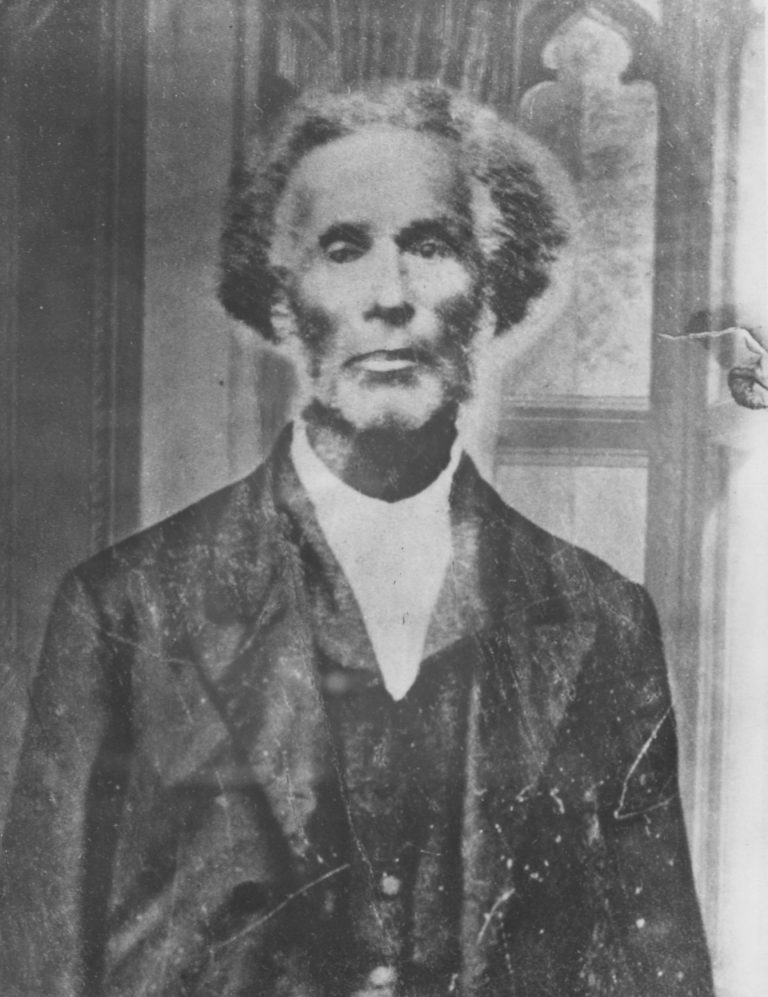
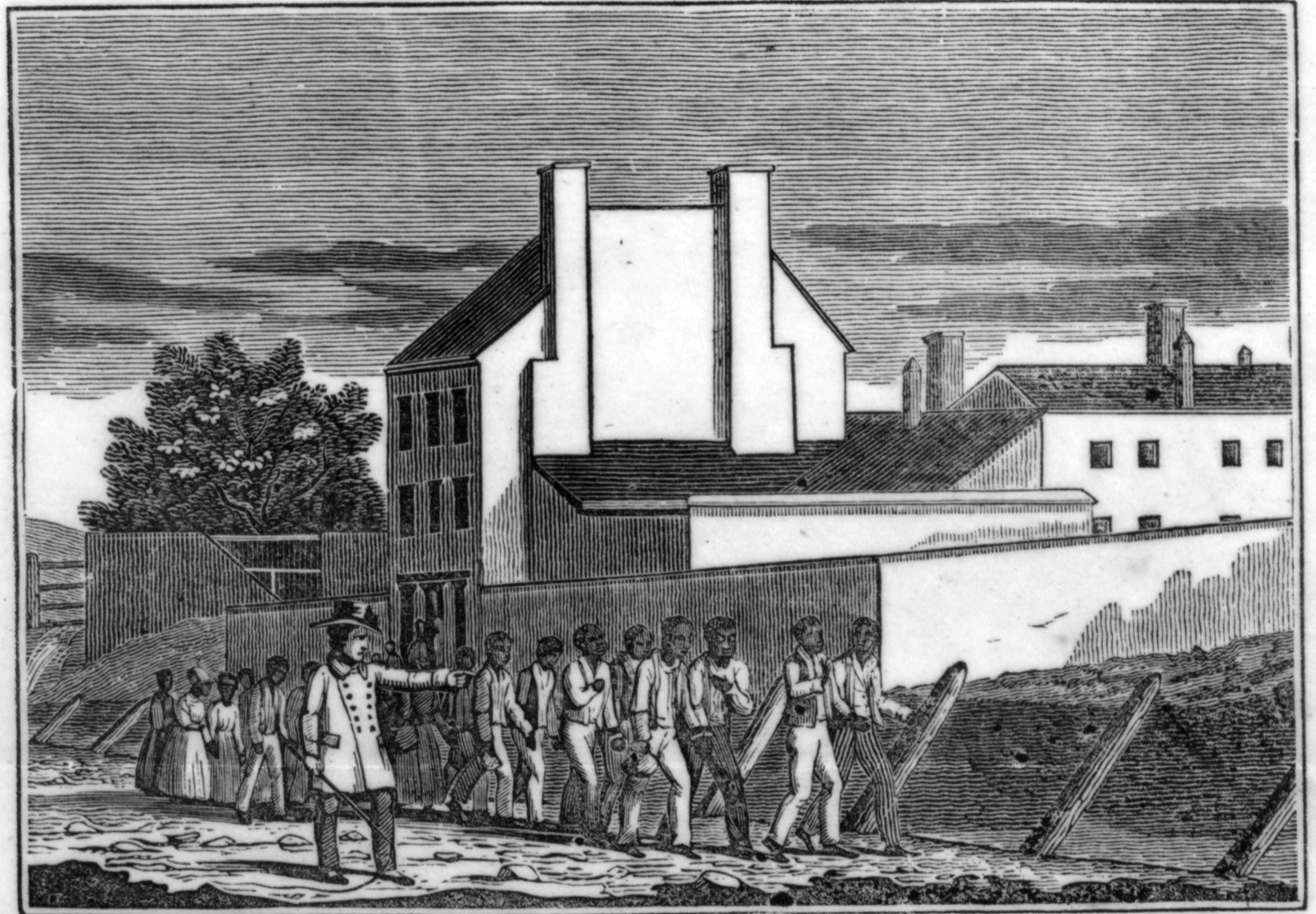
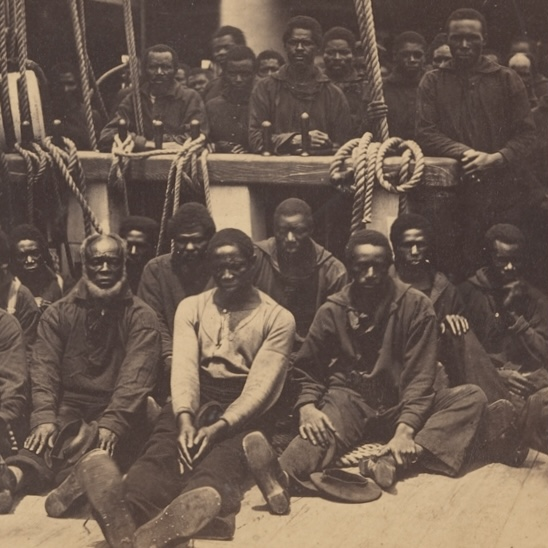
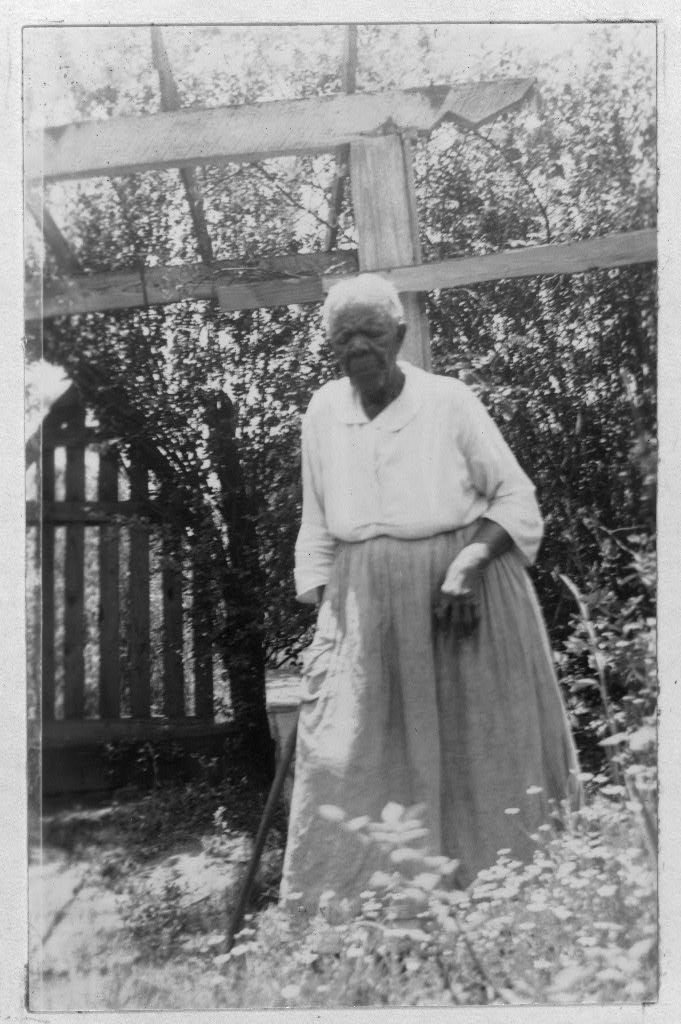
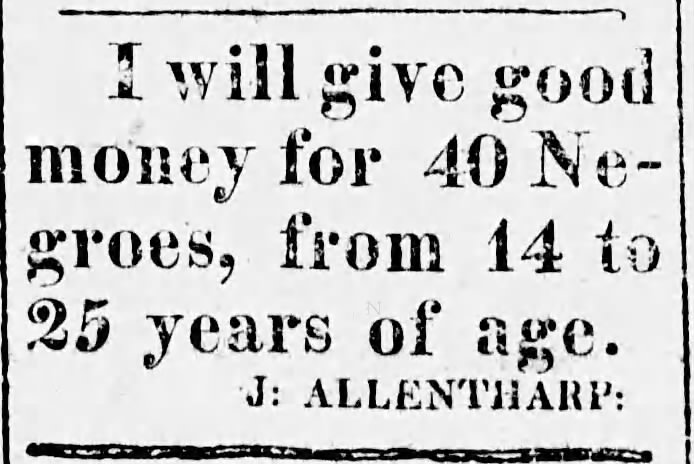
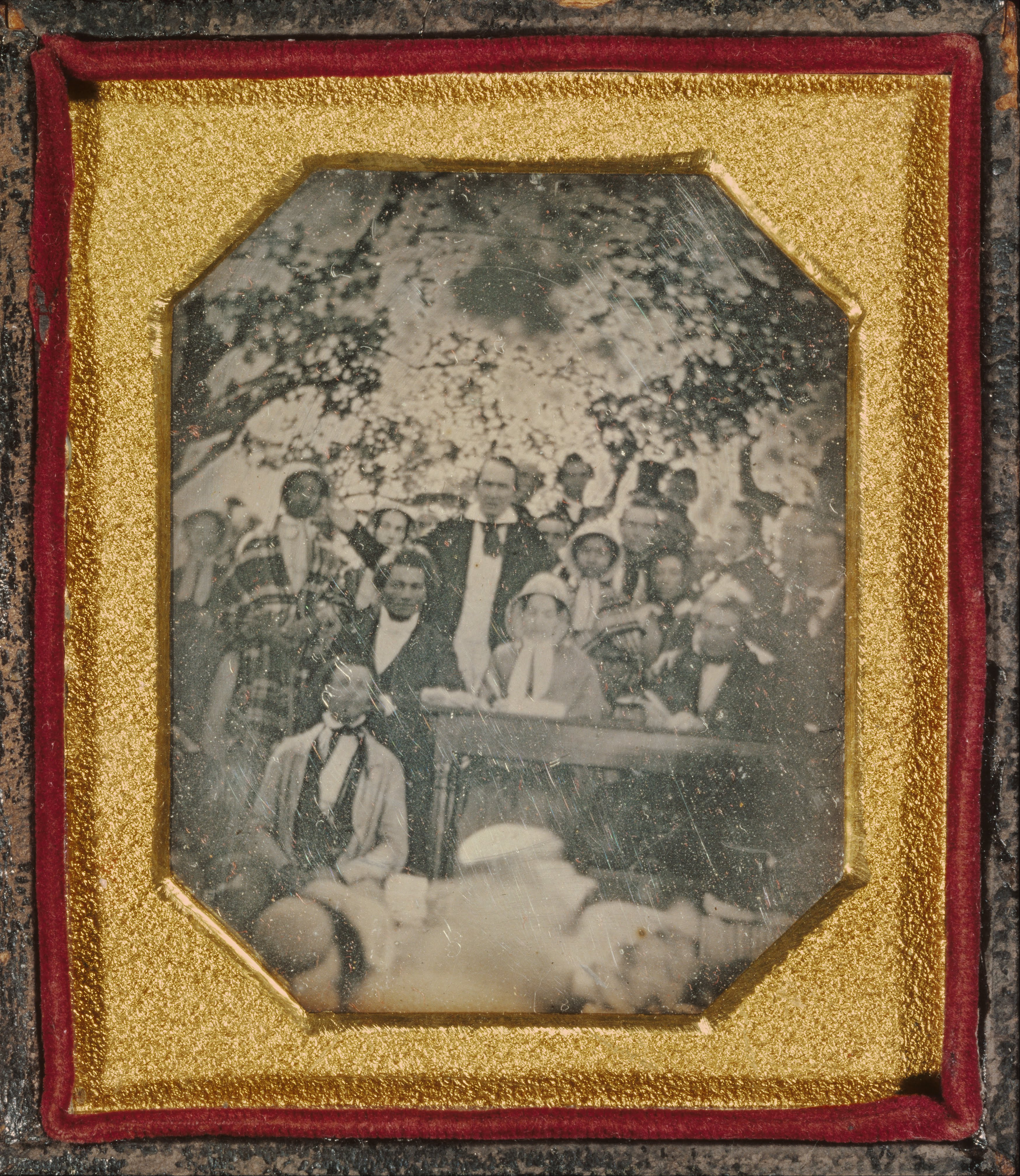
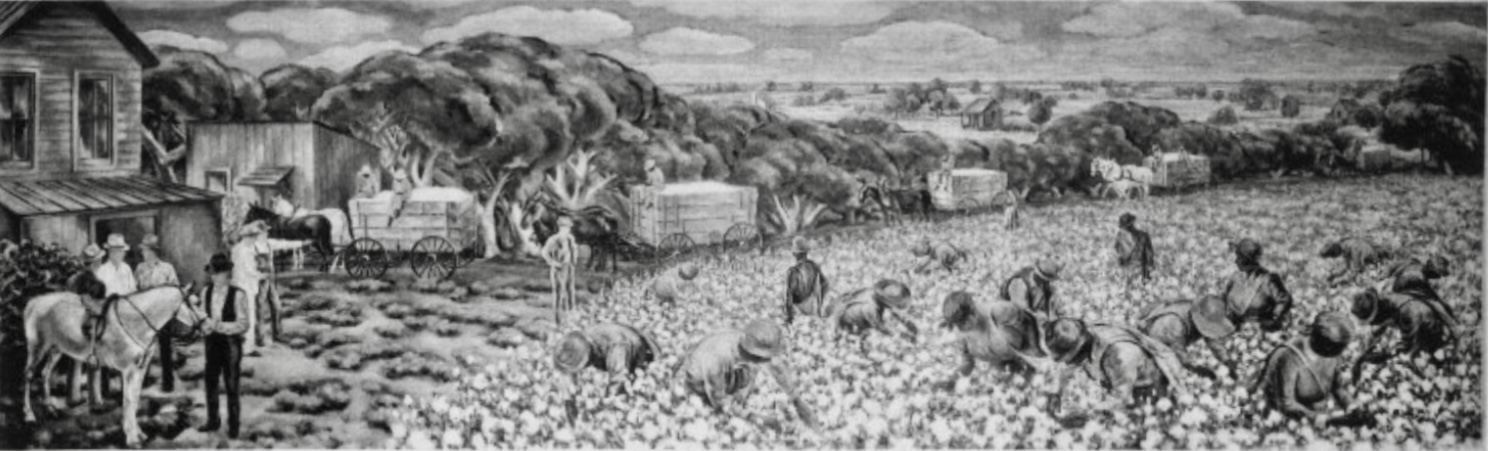
Whipping a slave, wood-engraving made 1834; Wilson Chinn, showing a slave collar and facial branding of the initials of his enslaver, Valsin B. Marmillion; slavery survivor Adam Crosswhite photographed 1878; Franklin & Armfield's slave jail in Alexandria, D.C., 1836; freedmen leaving South Carolina on the USS Vermont in 1862; Delia Garlic at age 100; 1818 Kentucky slave trader's ad; daguerreotype made at the 1850 Fugitive Slave Convention; White Gold in the Delta, painted 1939 by Beulah Bettersworth for the Indianola, Mississippi post office, mural destroyed 1960s

The legal institution of chattel slavery, comprising the enslavement primarily of Africans and African Americans, was prevalent in the United States from its founding in 1776 until 1865, predominantly in the South. Slavery was found throughout European colonization in the Americas. From 1526, during the early colonial period, it was practiced in what became Britain's colonies, including the Thirteen Colonies that formed the United States. Under the law, children were born into slavery, and an enslaved person was treated as property that could be bought, sold, or given away. Slavery persisted in about half of the U.S. states until its abolition after the civil war between the North and the South in 1865. Issues involving slavery seeped into every aspect of national politics, economics, and social customs. In the decades after Reconstruction ended in 1877, many of slavery's economic and social functions continued through segregation, sharecropping, and convict leasing. Involuntary servitude as a punishment for crime remains legal.

By the time of the American Revolutionary War (1775–1783), enslaved people had been institutionalized as a racial caste associated with African ancestry. During and immediately after the Revolution, abolitionist laws passed in most Northern states and a movement developed to abolish slavery. The role of slavery under the United States Constitution (1789) was highly contentious during its drafting. The Three-Fifths Clause of the Constitution inflated slave states' political power, while the Fugitive Slave Clause provided that, if a slave escaped to another state, the other state could not prevent the slave's return to the person claiming to be their owner. All Northern states had abolished slavery to some degree by 1805, sometimes with completion at a future date, and sometimes with an intermediary status of unpaid indentured servitude.

Abolition was, in many cases, gradual. Some slave owners, primarily in the Upper South, freed their slaves. Charitable groups bought and freed others. Individual states began to outlaw the Atlantic slave trade during the American Revolution, and Congress banned it in 1808. Nevertheless, smuggling was common thereafter, and the U.S. Revenue Cutter Service (Coast Guard) began to enforce the ban on the high seas. Before 1820, most serving congressmen owned slaves, and about 30% of congressmen born before 1840 (the last of whom, Rebecca Latimer Felton, served in the 1920s) owned slaves at some time in their lives.

The cotton industry's rapid expansion in the Deep South after the invention of the cotton gin greatly increased demand for slave labor, and the Southern states remained slave societies. The U.S., divided into slave and free states, became ever more polarized over slavery. Driven by labor demands from new cotton plantations in the Deep South, the Upper South sold more than a million slaves who were taken to the Deep South. The total slave population in the South eventually reached four million. As the U.S. expanded, the Southern states attempted to extend slavery into the new Western territories to allow pro-slavery forces to maintain power in Congress. The new territories acquired in the Louisiana Purchase and the Mexican Cession were the subject of major political crises and compromises. Slavery was defended in the South as a "positive good", and the largest religious denominations split over slavery into regional organizations of the North and South.

By 1850, the newly rich, cotton-growing South threatened to secede from the Union. Bloody fighting broke out over slavery in the Kansas Territory. When Abraham Lincoln won the 1860 election on a platform of halting the expansion of slavery, slave states seceded to form the Confederacy. Shortly afterward, the Civil War began when Confederate forces attacked the U.S. Army's Fort Sumter in Charleston, South Carolina. During the war some jurisdictions abolished slavery and, due to Union measures such as the Confiscation Acts and the Emancipation Proclamation, the war effectively ended slavery in most places. After the war, the Thirteenth Amendment to the United States Constitution was ratified on December 6, 1865, prohibiting "slavery [and] involuntary servitude, except as a punishment for crime."

== Background ==
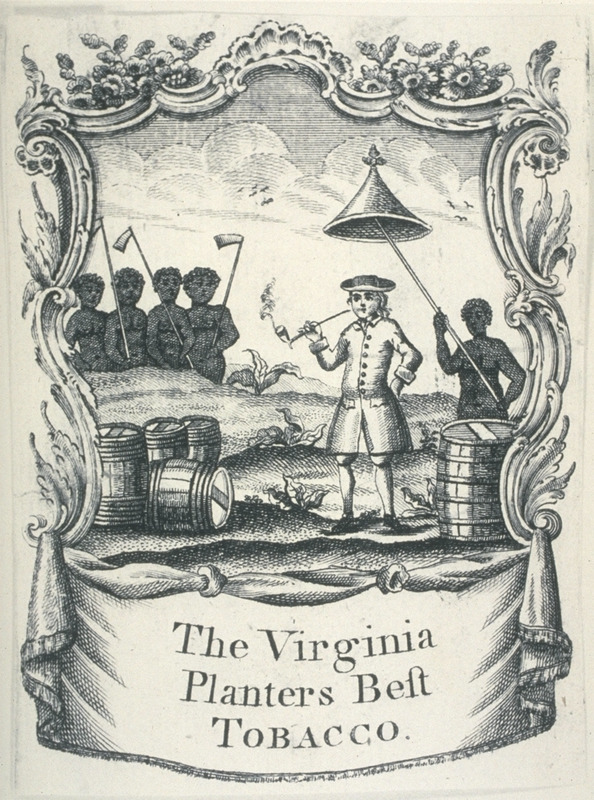
Image marketing 18th-century tobacco produced by enslaved laborers in the Colony of Virginia (Colonial Williamsburg Foundation)

During most of the British colonial period, slavery existed in all the colonies. People enslaved in the North typically worked as house servants, artisans, laborers, and craftsmen, mostly in cities. Many men worked on the docks and in shipping. In 1703, more than 42% of New York City households held enslaved people in bondage, the second-highest proportion of any city in the colonies, behind only Charleston, South Carolina. Enslaved people were also used as agricultural workers in farm communities, especially in the South, but also in upstate New York and Long Island, Connecticut, and New Jersey.

The South developed an agricultural economy dependent on commodity crops. Its planters rapidly acquired a significantly higher number and proportion of enslaved people, as its commodity crops were labor-intensive. Early on, enslaved people in the South worked primarily on farms and plantations growing indigo, rice, and tobacco (cotton did not become a major crop until after the 1790s). In 1720, about 65% of South Carolina's population was enslaved. Planters (defined by historians in the Upper South as those who held 20 or more slaves) used enslaved workers to cultivate commodity crops. They also worked in the artisanal trades on large plantations and in many Southern port cities. The 18th-century wave of settlers who settled along the Appalachian Mountains and backcountry were backwoods subsistence farmers, and they seldom held enslaved people.

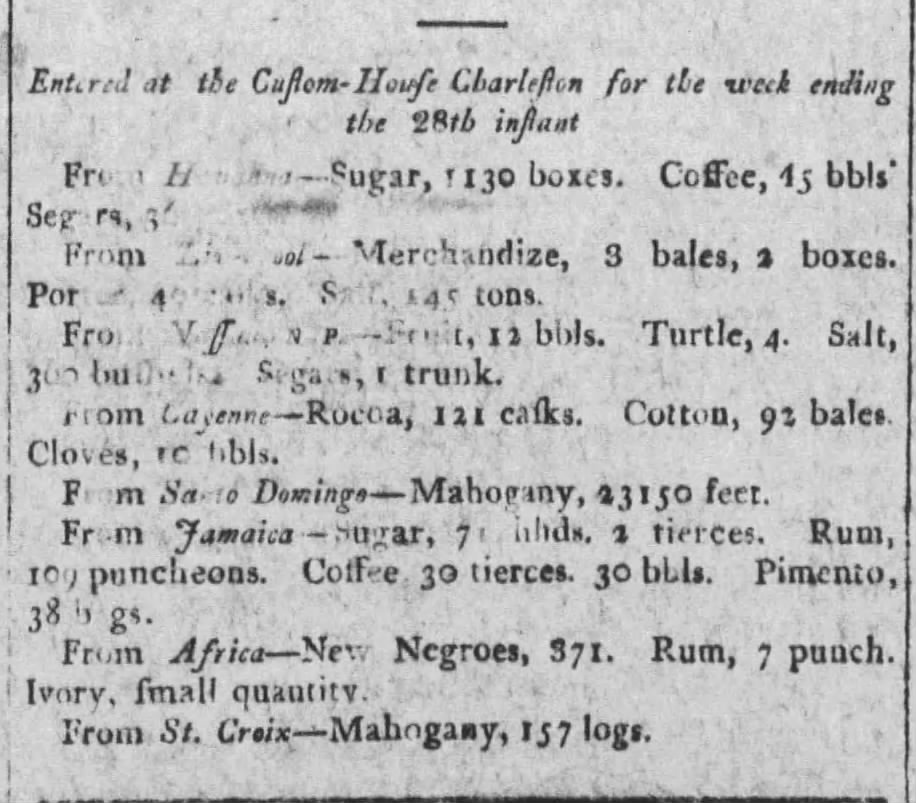
"Entered at the Custom-House Charleston for the week of the 28th instant...From Africa—New Negroes, 371. Rum, 7 punch. Ivory, small quantity" (Charleston Daily Courier, December 30, 1805)

In the second half of the 18th century, a debate emerged over the continued importation of African slaves to the American colonies. Many in the colonies, including the Southern slavocracy, opposed further importation of slaves due to fears that it would destabilize colonies and lead to further slave rebellions. In 1772, prominent Virginians submitted a petition to the Crown requesting that the slave trade to Virginia be abolished; it was rejected. Rhode Island forbade the importation of slaves in 1774. The influential revolutionary Fairfax Resolves called for an end to the "wicked, cruel and unnatural" Atlantic slave trade. All the colonies banned slave importations during the Revolutionary War.

== Slavery in the American Revolution and early republic ==
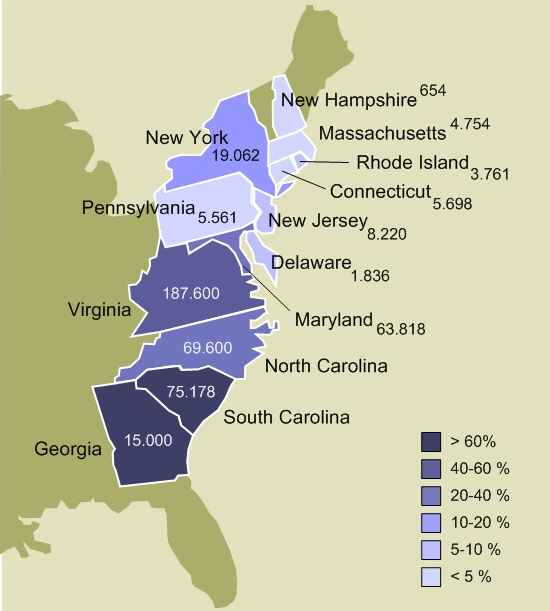
A map of the Thirteen Colonies in 1770, showing number of slaves in each colony and percentage of colony's total population held as slaves

Slavery had existed for thousands of years, all around the world. In British colonies and many parts of the world it was legal, and in many societies it had become socially and economically entrenched. The ideals and principles promoted in the Enlightenment and the American Revolution helped put slavery and the desire for its abolition on the political agenda. Historian Christopher L. Brown wrote that slavery "had never been on the agenda in a serious way before" but the American Revolution "forced it to be a public question from there forward".

After the new country's independence was secure, slavery was a topic of contention at the 1787 Constitutional Convention. Many of the Founding Fathers of the United States were plantation owners who owned large numbers of enslaved laborers; the original Constitution preserved their right to own slaves, and they gained a political advantage in owning slaves: although the enslaved of the early Republic were considered sentient property, were not permitted to vote, and had no rights to speak of, they were to be enumerated in population censuses and counted as three-fifths of a person for the purposes of representation in the national legislature, the U.S. Congress.

=== Slaves and free blacks who supported the Continental Army ===
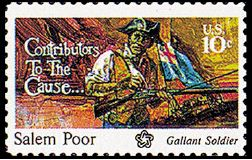
This postage stamp, which was created at the time of the Bicentennial, honors Salem Poor, who was an enslaved African-American man who purchased his freedom, became a soldier, and rose to fame as a war hero during the Battle of Bunker Hill.

The rebels began to offer freedom as an incentive to motivate slaves to fight on their side. Washington authorized slaves to be freed who fought with the American Continental Army. Rhode Island started enlisting slaves in 1778, and promised compensation to owners whose slaves enlisted and survived to gain freedom. During the course of the war, about one-fifth of the Northern army was black. In 1781, Baron Closen, a German officer in the French Royal Deux-Ponts Regiment at the Battle of Yorktown, estimated the American army to be about one-quarter black. These men included both former slaves and free-born blacks. Thousands of free blacks in the Northern states fought in the state militias and Continental Army. In the South, both sides offered freedom to slaves who would perform military service. Roughly 20,000 slaves fought in the American Revolution.

=== Black Loyalists ===
After the Revolutionary War broke out, the British realized they lacked the manpower necessary to prosecute the war. In response, British commanders began issuing proclamations to Patriot-owned slaves, offering freedom if they fled to British lines and assisted the British war effort. Such proclamations were repeatedly issued over the course of the conflict, which resulted in up to 100,000 American slaves fleeing to British lines. Self-emancipated slaves who reached British lines were organized into a variety of military units, which served in all theaters of the war. Formerly enslaved women and children, in lieu of military service, worked instead as laborers and domestic servants. At the end of the war, freed slaves in British lines either evacuated to other British colonies or to Britain itself, were re-enslaved by the victorious Americans, or fled into the countryside.

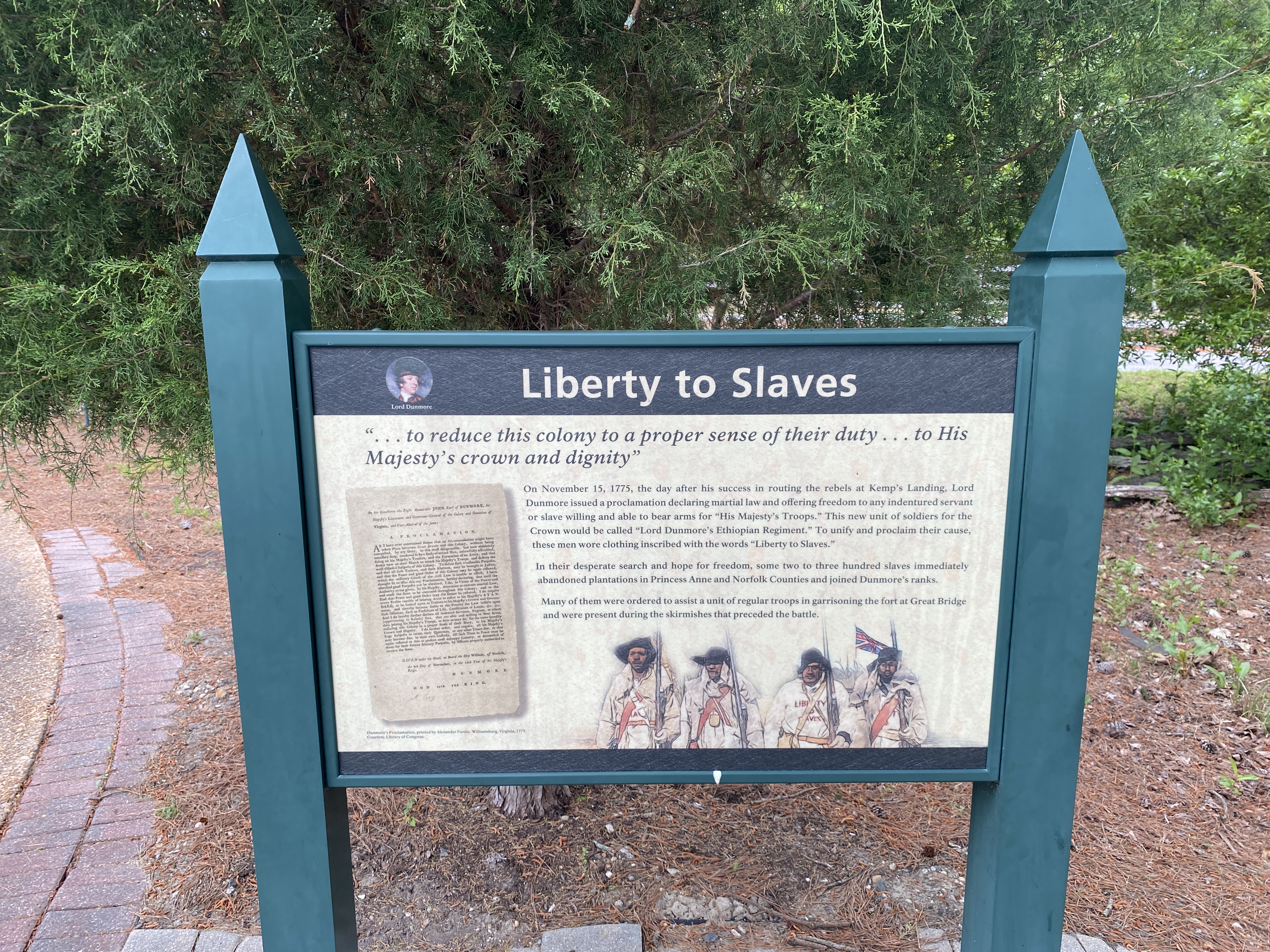
Memorial to Lord Dunmore's Ethiopian Regiment of Black Loyalists who wore clothing inscribed with the words "Liberty to Slaves"

In early 1775, the royal governor of Virginia, Lord Dunmore, wrote to the Earl of Dartmouth of his intention to free slaves owned by American Patriots in case they staged a rebellion. On November 7, 1775, Dunmore issued Dunmore's Proclamation, which promised freedom to any slaves of American patriots who would leave their masters and join the British forces. Historians agree that the proclamation was chiefly designed for practical rather than moral reasons, and slaves owned by American Loyalists were unaffected by the proclamation. About 1,500 slaves owned by patriots escaped and joined Dunmore's forces. A total of 18 slaves fled George Washington's plantation, one of whom, Harry, served in Dunmore's all-black loyalist regiment called "the Black Pioneers". Escapees who joined Dunmore had "Liberty to Slaves" stitched on to their clothes. Most died of disease before they could do any fighting, but three hundred of these freed slaves made it to freedom in Britain. Historian Jill Lepore writes that "between eighty and a hundred thousand (nearly one in five black slaves) left their homes ... betting on British victory", but Cassandra Pybus states that between 20,000 and 30,000 is a more realistic number of slaves who defected to the British side during the war.

Many slaves took advantage of the disruption of war to escape from their plantations to British lines or to fade into the general population. Upon their first sight of British vessels, thousands of slaves in Maryland and Virginia fled from their owners. Throughout the South, losses of slaves were high, with many due to escapes. Slaves also escaped throughout New England and the mid-Atlantic, with many joining the British who had occupied New York. In the closing months of the war, the British evacuated freedmen and also removed slaves owned by loyalists. Around 15,000 black loyalists left with the British, most of them ending up as free people in England or its colonies. Washington hired a slave catcher during the war, and at its end he pressed the British to return the slaves to their masters. With the British certificates of freedom in their belongings, the black loyalists, including Washington's slave Harry, sailed with their white counterparts out of New York harbor to Nova Scotia. More than 3,000 were resettled in Nova Scotia, where they were eventually granted land and formed the community of the black Nova Scotians.

=== Early abolitionism in the United States ===
In the first two decades after the American Revolution, state legislatures and individuals took actions to free slaves. Northern states passed new constitutions that contained language about equal rights or specifically abolished slavery; some states, such as New York and New Jersey, where slavery was more widespread, passed laws by the end of the 18th century to abolish slavery incrementally. By 1804, all the Northern states had passed laws outlawing slavery, either immediately or over time. In New York, the last slaves were freed in 1827 (celebrated with a big July 5 parade).

No Southern state abolished slavery, but some individual owners, more than a handful, freed their slaves by personal decision, often providing for manumission in wills but sometimes filing deeds or court papers to free individuals. Numerous slaveholders who freed their slaves cited revolutionary ideals in their documents; others freed slaves as a promised reward for service. From 1790 to 1810, the proportion of blacks free in the United States increased from 8% to 13.5%, and in the Upper South from less than 1% to nearly 10% as a result of these actions.

Starting in 1777, the states outlawed the importation of slaves one by one. They all acted to end the international trade, but, after the war, it was reopened in North Carolina (opened until 1794) and Georgia (opened until 1798) and South Carolina (opened until 1787, and then reopened again in 1803.) In 1807, the United States Congress acted on President Thomas Jefferson's advice and, without controversy, made importing slaves from abroad a federal crime, effective the first day that the United States Constitution permitted this prohibition: January 1, 1808.

During the Revolution and in the following years, all states north of Maryland ( the Mason–Dixon line) took steps towards abolishing slavery. In 1777, the independent Vermont Republic passed a state constitution prohibiting slavery. The Pennsylvania Abolition Society, led in part by Benjamin Franklin, was founded in 1775, and Pennsylvania began gradual abolition in 1780. In 1783, the Supreme Judicial Court of Massachusetts ruled in Commonwealth v. Jennison that slavery was unconstitutional under the state's new 1780 constitution. New Hampshire began gradual emancipation in 1783, while Connecticut and Rhode Island followed suit in 1784. The New York Manumission Society, which was led by John Jay, Alexander Hamilton, and Aaron Burr, was founded in 1785. New York state began gradual emancipation in 1799, and New Jersey did the same in 1804.

In 1787, the Northwest Territory was established by the Continental Congress, and it excluded slavery. It became the states of Ohio, Michigan, Indiana, Illinois, and Wisconsin, as well as part of Minnesota. It doubled the size of the United States. As each new state wrote its constitution, slavery was prohibited, although Illinois allowed the presence of slaves temporarily brought in by their owners.

=== Constitution of the United States ===
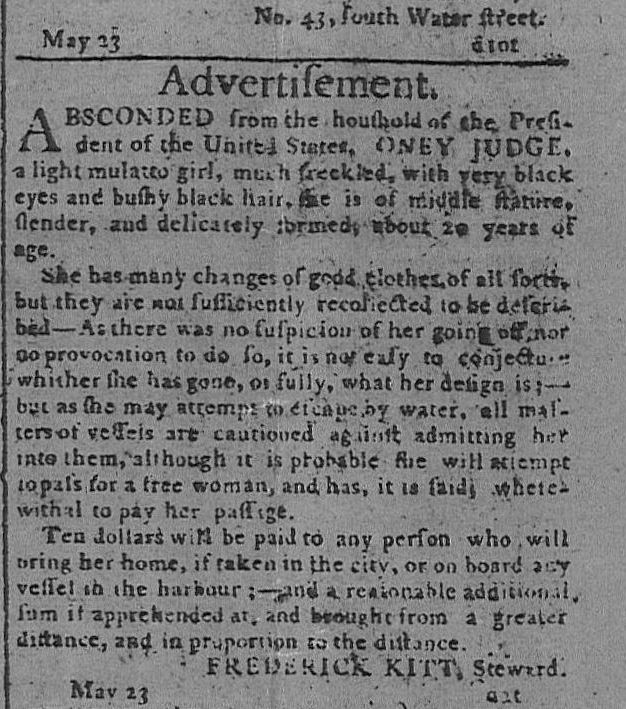
Advertisement in Pennsylvania Gazette, May 24, 1796, seeking the return of Oney Judge, a fugitive slave who had escaped from the household of George Washington

Slavery was a contentious issue in the writing and approval of the Constitution of the United States. The words "slave" and "slavery" did not appear in the Constitution as originally adopted, although several provisions clearly referred to slaves and slavery. Until the adoption of the 13th Amendment in 1865, the Constitution did not prohibit slavery.

Section 9 of Article I forbade the federal government from prohibiting the importation of slaves, described as "such Persons as any of the States now existing shall think proper to admit", for twenty years after the Constitution's ratification (until January 1, 1808). The Act Prohibiting Importation of Slaves of 1807, passed by Congress and signed into law by President Thomas Jefferson (who had called for its enactment in his 1806 State of the Union address), went into effect on January 1, 1808, the earliest date on which the importation of slaves could be prohibited under the Constitution.

The delegates approved the Fugitive Slave Clause of the Constitution (Article IV, section 2, clause 3), which prohibited states from freeing those "held to Service or Labour" (meaning slaves, indentures, and apprentices) who fled to them from another state and required that they be returned to their owners. The Fugitive Slave Act of 1793 and the Fugitive Slave Act of 1850 gave effect to the Fugitive Slave Clause. Salmon P. Chase considered the Fugitive Slave Acts unconstitutional because "The Fugitive Slave Clause was a compact among the states, not a grant of power to the federal government".

==== Three-fifths Compromise ====
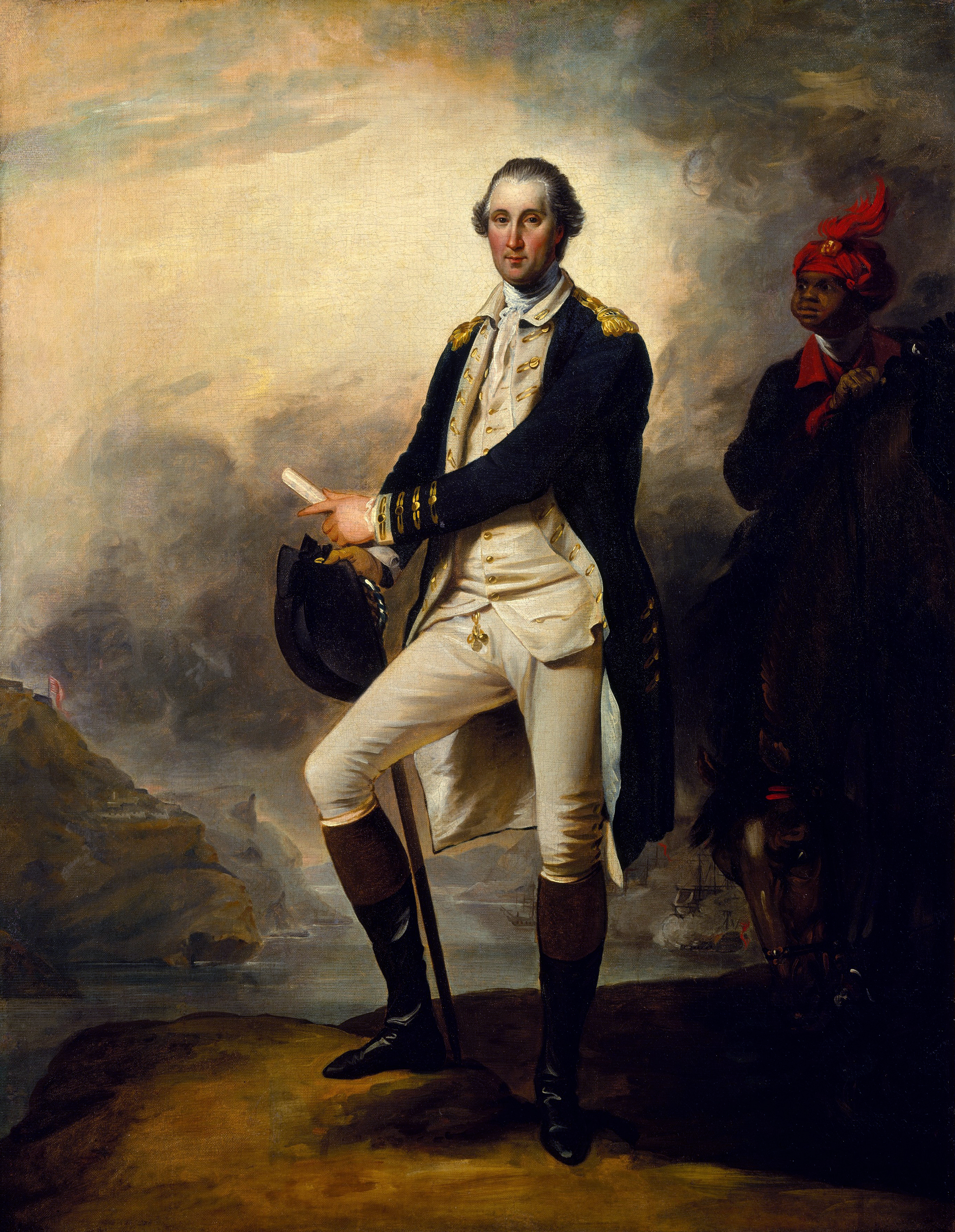
John Trumbull's 1780 portrait George Washington also depicts a man believed to be Washington's enslaved valet William Lee (Metropolitan Museum of Art 24.109.88)

In a section negotiated by James Madison of Virginia, Section 2 of Article I designated "other persons" (slaves) to be added to the total of the state's free population, at the rate of three-fifths of their total number, to establish the state's official population for the purposes of apportionment of congressional representation and federal taxation. The "Three-Fifths Compromise" was reached after a debate in which delegates from Southern (slave-holding) states argued that slaves should be counted in the census just as all other persons were while delegates from Northern (free) states countered that slaves should not be counted at all. The compromise strengthened the political power of Southern states, as three-fifths of the (non-voting) slave population was counted for congressional apportionment and in the Electoral College, although it did not strengthen Southern states as much as it would have had the Constitution provided for counting all persons, whether slave or free, equally.

In addition, many parts of the country were tied to the Southern economy. As the historian James Oliver Horton noted, prominent slaveholder politicians and the commodity crops of the South had a strong influence on United States politics and economy. Horton said,

in the 72 years between the election of George Washington and the election of Abraham Lincoln, 50 of those years [had] a slaveholder as president of the United States, and, for that whole period of time, there was never a person elected to a second term who was not a slaveholder.

The power of Southern states in Congress lasted until the Civil War, affecting national policies, legislation, and appointments. One result was that most of the justices appointed to the Supreme Court were slave owners. The planter elite dominated the Southern congressional delegations and the United States presidency for nearly fifty years.

== Slavery in the 19th century ==
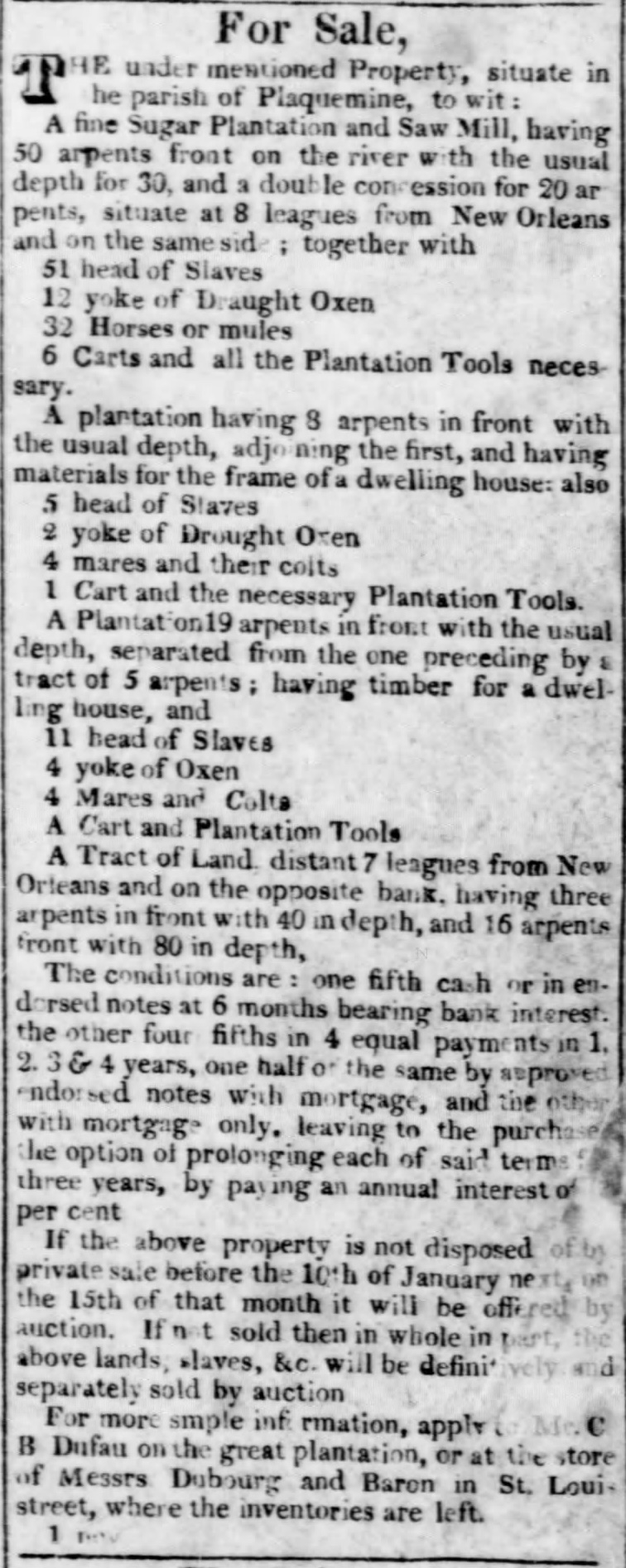
For sale: 51 head of slaves, 12 yoke of draught oxen, 32 horses or mules; 5 head of slaves, 2 yoke of draught oxen; 11 head of slaves, 4 yoke of oxen—in early America, slaves were treated legally and socially as if they were farm animals (Louisiana State Gazette, New Orleans, November 1, 1819)

According to demographic calculations by J. David Hacker of the University of Minnesota, approximately four out of five of all of the slaves who ever lived in the United States or the territory that became the United States (beginning in 1619 and including all colonies that were eventually acquired or conquered by the United States) were born in or imported to the United States in the 19th century. Slaves were the labor force of the South, but slave ownership (and the dispossession and expulsion of Native Americans from their lands) was also the foundation upon which American white supremacy was constructed. Historian Walter Johnson argues that "one of the many miraculous things a slave could do was make a household white...", meaning that the value of whiteness in America was in some ways measured by the ability to purchase and maintain black slaves.

Slavery in the United States was a variable thing, in "constant flux, driven by the violent pursuit of ever-larger profits." The enslaved labor force of the United States, while stereotypically drawn as field labor for the production of cash crops like sugar and cotton, performed nearly every type of skilled labor sought by the economy. An examination of 1200 runaway slave ads published in Tennessee found 25 blacksmiths, 18 carpenters, and 13 shoemakers, as well as barbers, boat builders, bricklayers, a "conjurer or fortune teller," cooks, coopers, cotton mill engineers, dressmakers (often called mantuamakers), hack drivers, iron furnace engineers, milliners, millwrights, ministers, musicians (most commonly of the fiddle/violin), a racehorse trainer, ostlers, plasterers, painters, seamstresses, stonemasons, tanners, a "turner and tin-plate workman," wagoners, waiters, and weavers. Complex as it was, historians do know, however, that slavery in the United States was not a "deferred-compensation trade school opportunity." Harriet Beecher Stowe summarized slavery in the United States in 1853:

What, then, is American slavery, as we have seen it exhibited by law, and by the decision of Courts? Let us begin by stating what it is not:

1. It is not apprenticeship.

2. It is not guardianship.

3. It is in no sense a system for the education of a weaker race by a stronger.

4. The happiness of the governed is in no sense its object.

5. The temporal improvement or the eternal well-being of the governed is in no sense its object.

The object of it has been distinctly stated in one sentence by Judge Ruffin,— "The end is the profit of the master, his security, and the public safety."

Slavery, then, is absolute despotism, of the most unmitigated form.

=== Justifications in the South ===
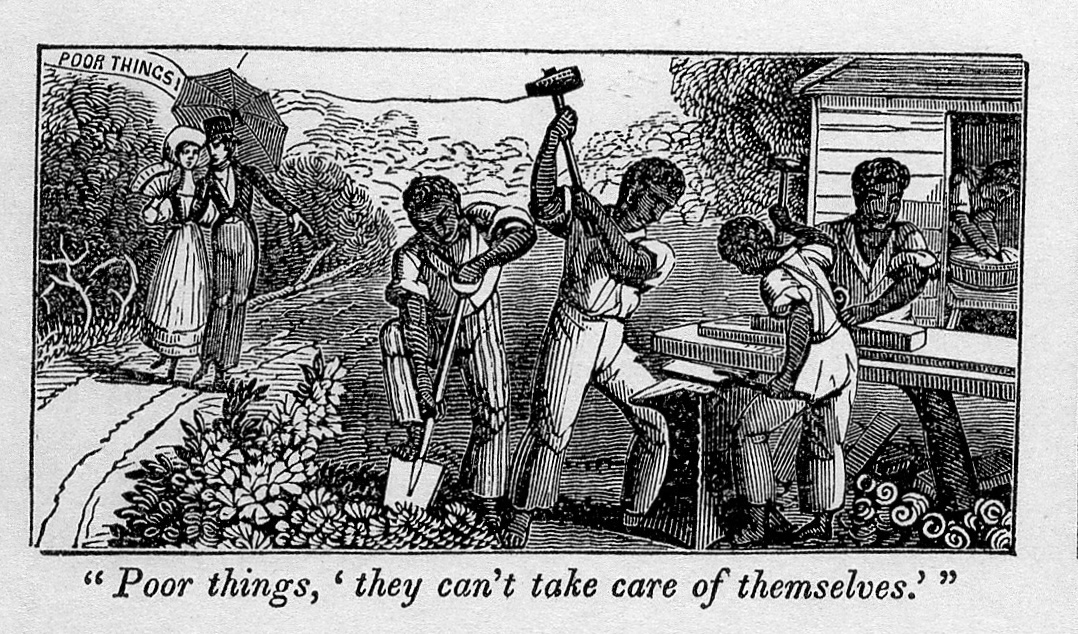
One of the many defenses of American slavery was that the imagined "benevolent paternalism" of planters was beneficial or necessary (Detail, Anti-Slavery Almanac, 1840)

==== American slavery as "a necessary evil" ====
In the 19th century, proponents of slavery often defended the institution as a "necessary evil". At that time, it was feared that emancipation of black slaves would have more harmful social and economic consequences than the continuation of slavery. On April 22, 1820, Thomas Jefferson, one of the Founding Fathers of the United States, wrote in a letter to John Holmes, that with slavery,

We have the wolf by the ear, and we can neither hold him, nor safely let him go. Justice is in one scale, and self-preservation in the other.

In his influential Democracy in America (1835), the French writer and traveler Alexis de Tocqueville expressed opposition to slavery while observing its effects on American society. He felt that a multiracial society without slavery was untenable, as he believed that prejudice against blacks increased as they were granted more rights (for example, in Northern states). He believed that white Southerners' attitudes, and the concentration of the black population in the South, were bringing the white and black populations to a state of equilibrium and were a danger to both races. Because of the racial differences between master and slave, he believed the latter could not be emancipated.

In a letter to his wife dated December 27, 1856, in reaction to a message from President Franklin Pierce, Robert E. Lee wrote,

There are few, I believe, in this enlightened age, who will not acknowledge that slavery as an institution is a moral and political evil. It is idle to expatiate on its disadvantages. I think it is a greater evil to the white than to the colored race. While my feelings are strongly enlisted in behalf of the latter, my sympathies are more deeply engaged for the former. The blacks are immeasurably better off here than in Africa, morally, physically, and socially. The painful discipline they are undergoing is necessary for their further instruction as a race, and will prepare them, I hope, for better things. How long their servitude may be necessary is known and ordered by a merciful Providence.

==== American slavery as "a positive good" ====
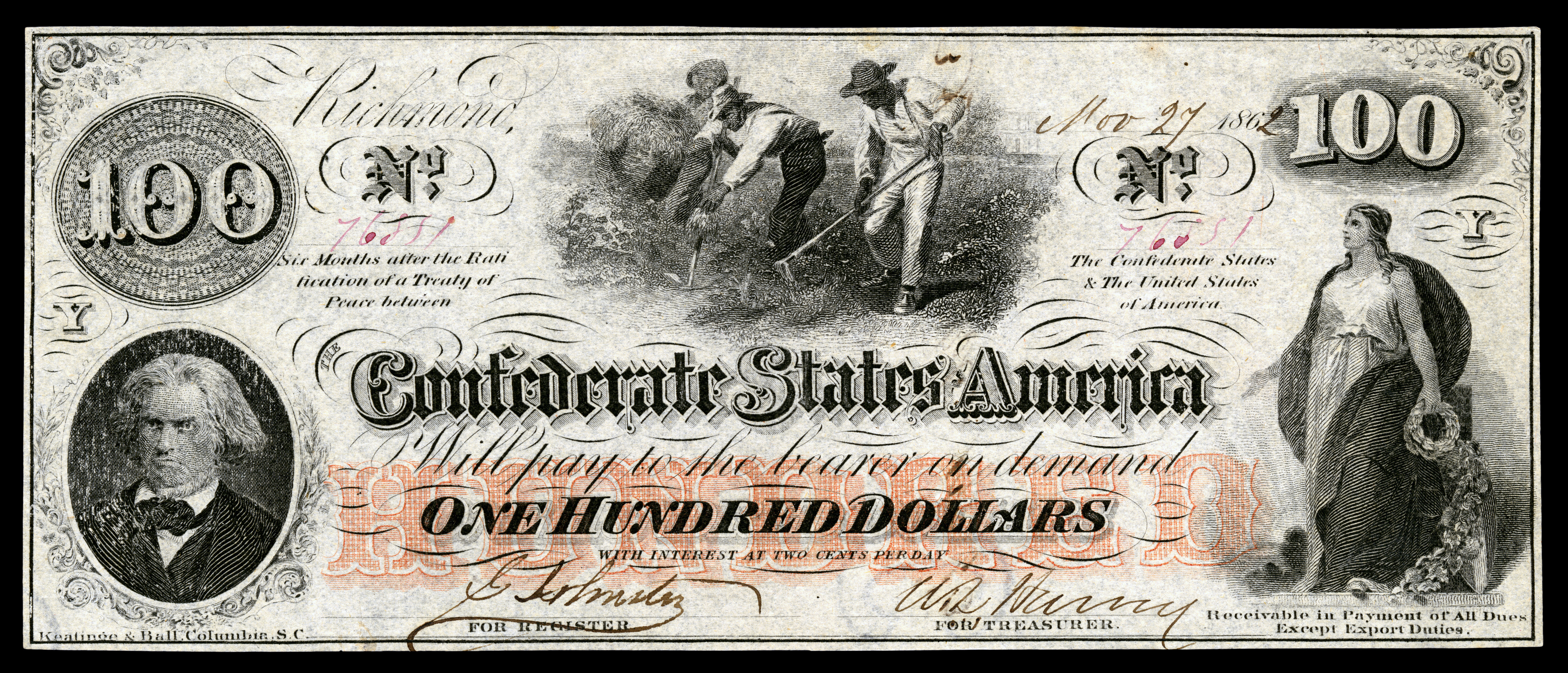
Confederate $100 bill, 1862–63, showing slaves farming; there were over 125 carefully wrought etchings of laboring slaves made for currency issued by 19th-century Southern banks and the Confederate States, images that provided reassurance that slavery "was protected both by law and by tradition." In 1860, Southern slaveholders held slaves as personal property (Note: Slaves were considered personal property in all slave states except Louisiana, which deemed them real estate.) collectively valued at more than $3 billion (about $97 billion in 2022) (National Numismatic Collection, National Museum of American History)

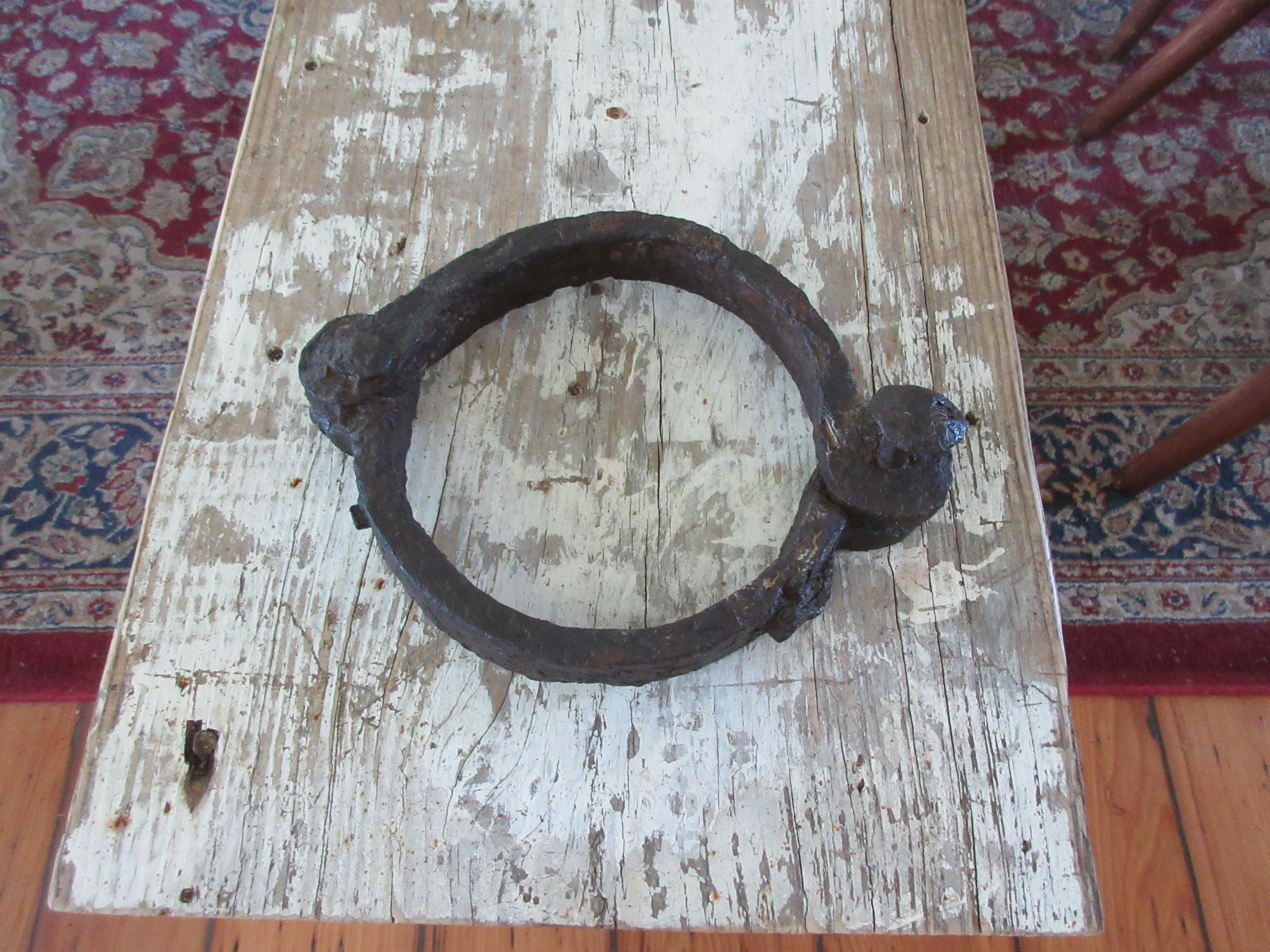
Slave shackle found while digging in a property on Baronne Street in New Orleans; donated to the Kid Ory Historic House museum

As the abolitionist movement's agitation increased and the area developed for plantations expanded, apologies for slavery became fainter in the South. Leaders then described slavery as a beneficial scheme of labor management. In a famous 1837 Senate speech, John C. Calhoun declared that slavery was "instead of an evil, a good—a positive good". Calhoun supported his view with the following reasoning: in every civilized society one portion of the community must live on the labor of another; learning, science, and the arts are built upon leisure; the African slave, kindly treated by his master and mistress and looked after in his old age, is better off than the free laborers of Europe; and under the slave system conflicts between capital and labor are avoided. The advantages of slavery in this respect, he concluded, "will become more and more manifest, if left undisturbed by interference from without, as the country advances in wealth and numbers".

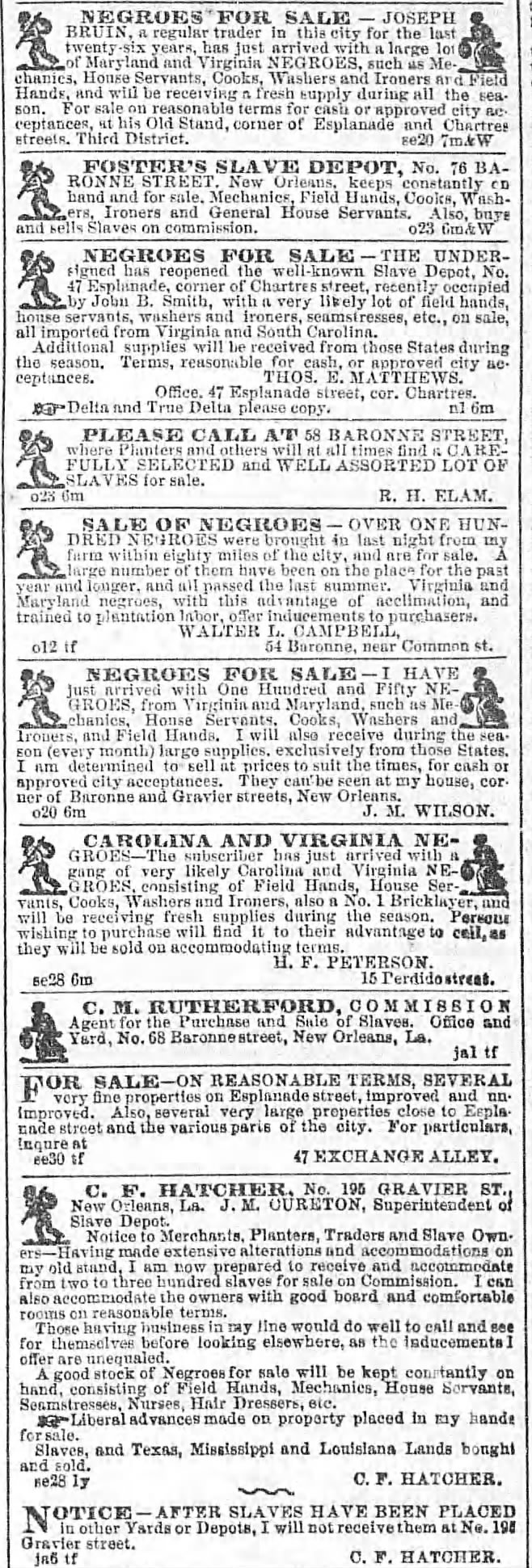
Newspaper listings for New Orleans slave depots at Barrone and Gravier Street, and at 54, 58, 68, and 78 Barrone represented but a slim fraction of the trade in the city (New Orleans Crescent, January 10, 1861)

South Carolina army officer, planter, and railroad executive James Gadsden called slavery "a social blessing" and abolitionists "the greatest curse of the nation". Gadsden supported South Carolina's secession in 1850 and led efforts to split California into two states, one slave and one free.

Southern writers James Henry Hammond and George Fitzhugh also began to portray slavery as a positive good. They presented several arguments to defend the practice. Like Calhoun, Hammond argued that slavery was needed to build the rest of society. In a speech to the Senate on March 4, 1858, Hammond developed his "Mudsill Theory", saying: "Such a class you must have, or you would not have that other class which leads progress, civilization, and refinement. It constitutes the very mud-sill of society and of political government; and you might as well attempt to build a house in the air, as to build either the one or the other, except on this mud-sill." Hammond said that, in every class, one group must accomplish all the menial duties, because without them society's leaders could not progress. He argued that the hired laborers of the North were slaves too: "The difference ... is, that our slaves are hired for life and well compensated; there is no starvation, no begging, no want of employment", while those in the North had to seek employment.

Fitzhugh used assumptions about white superiority to justify slavery, writing, "the Negro is but a grown up child, and must be governed as a child." In The Universal Law of Slavery, Fitzhugh argues that slavery provides everything necessary for life and that the slave is unable to survive in a free world because he is lazy and cannot compete with the intelligent European white race. He writes, "The negro slaves of the South are the happiest, and in some sense, the freest people in the world." Without the South, "He [a slave] would become an insufferable burden to society" and "Society has the right to prevent this, and can only do so by subjecting him to domestic slavery."

On March 21, 1861, Vice President of the Confederacy Alexander Stephens gave his Cornerstone Speech. He explained the differences between the Constitution of the Confederate States and the United States Constitution, laid out the cause for the American Civil War, as he saw it, and defended slavery:

The new [Confederate] Constitution has put at rest forever all the agitating questions relating to our peculiar institutions—African slavery as it exists among us—the proper status of the negro in our form of civilization. This was the immediate cause of the late rupture and present revolution. Jefferson, in his forecast, had anticipated this, as the "rock upon which the old Union would split." He was right. What was conjecture with him, is now a realized fact. But whether he fully comprehended the great truth upon which that rock stood and stands, may be doubted. The prevailing ideas entertained by him and most of the leading statesmen at the time of the formation of the old Constitution were, that the enslavement of the African was in violation of the laws of nature; that it was wrong in principle, socially, morally and politically. It was an evil they knew not well how to deal with; but the general opinion of the men of that day was, that, somehow or other, in the order of Providence, the institution would be evanescent and pass away [...] Those ideas, however, were fundamentally wrong. They rested upon the assumption of the equality of races. This was an error. It was a sandy foundation, and the idea of a Government built upon it—when the "storm came and the wind blew, it fell".

Our new [Confederate] Government is founded upon exactly the opposite ideas; its foundations are laid, its cornerstone rests, upon the great truth that the negro is not equal to the white man; that slavery, subordination to the superior race, is his natural and moral condition.

This view of the "Negro race" was backed by pseudoscience. The leading researcher was Samuel A. Cartwright, a Southerner and the inventor of the mental illnesses of drapetomania (the desire of a slave to run away) and dysaesthesia aethiopica ("rascality"), both cured, according to him, by whipping. The Medical Association of Louisiana set up a committee, which he chaired, to investigate "the Diseases and Physical Peculiarities of the Negro Race". Their report, first delivered to the Medical Association in an address, was published in their journal in 1851, and then reprinted in part in the widely circulated DeBow's Review.

==== American slavery as a cornerstone of world economics ====
Many American Southerners justified slavery as a fundamental part of the world's economic system. Central to this belief was the King Cotton ideology—the idea that global industrial economies, particularly in Britain and France, heavily depended on the South's cotton exports, which were affordable only due to enslaved labor. Alabama Governor John A. Winston said, "the suspension of involuntary servitude for a single year only, would cause convulsions in all the governments of the civilised world, the disastrous results of which, it would be beyond human ken to foresee."

Southerners often pointed to the economic disruptions faced by Britain, France, and Denmark following emancipation as proof of slavery's importance. Some even believed these nations might reverse abolition due to market pressures. Many Southerners interpreted the British repeal of protectionist tariffs against slave-grown sugar in 1846, alongside Europe's broader turn toward free trade in the 1850s, as tacit recognition that slave-based commodities remained essential to the global economy.

==== Southern attempts to expand slavery ====
Throughout the 19th century, many white Southern Americans sought to expand slavery into new territories. The most successful example was Texas. Anglo-American settlers in Texas declared independence from Mexico in March 1836 and defeated the Mexican army at the Battle of San Jacinto. One of the primary motivations for independence was to preserve slavery, which the Mexican government had abolished. After a decade of political debate in the United States, Texas was annexed in 1845.

But most attempts to expand slavery failed. Efforts to extend it into territories acquired during the Mexican Cession met resistance, culminating in the Compromise of 1850. Several high-profile expansionist initiatives, such as the Ostend Manifesto (a plan to annex Cuba as a slave state) and Narciso López's filibustering expeditions to Cuba, were unsuccessful. There were also ambitions to expand slavery into Mexico, Nicaragua (see Walker Affair and Filibuster War), and other parts of Latin America within the proposed "Golden Circle".

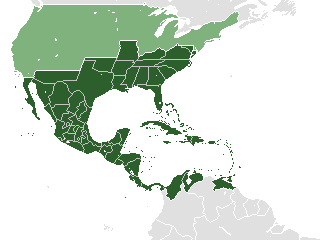
Dark green indicates the reach of the Golden Circle, an aspirational empire for American slave owners

Some other controversial proposals included:

- Actively sought to reopen the transatlantic slave trade
- Funded illegal slave shipments from the Caribbean and Africa, such as the Wanderer slave shipment to Georgia in 1858
- Wanted to reintroduce slavery in the Northern states, through federal action or Constitutional amendment making slavery legal nationwide, thus overriding state anti-slavery laws. (See Crittenden Compromise.) This was described as "well underway" by 1858.
- Said openly that slavery should by no means be limited to black people, since in their view it was beneficial. Northern white workers, who were allegedly "wage slaves" already, would allegedly have better lives if they were enslaved.

None of these ideas got very far, but they alarmed Northerners and contributed to the country's growing polarization.

=== Abolitionism in the North ===
Slavery is a volcano, the fires of which cannot be quenched, nor its ravishes controlled. We already feel its convulsions, and if we sit idly gazing upon its flames, as they rise higher and higher, our happy republic will be buried in ruin, beneath its overwhelming energies.

— William Ellsworth, attorney for Prudence Crandall, 1834

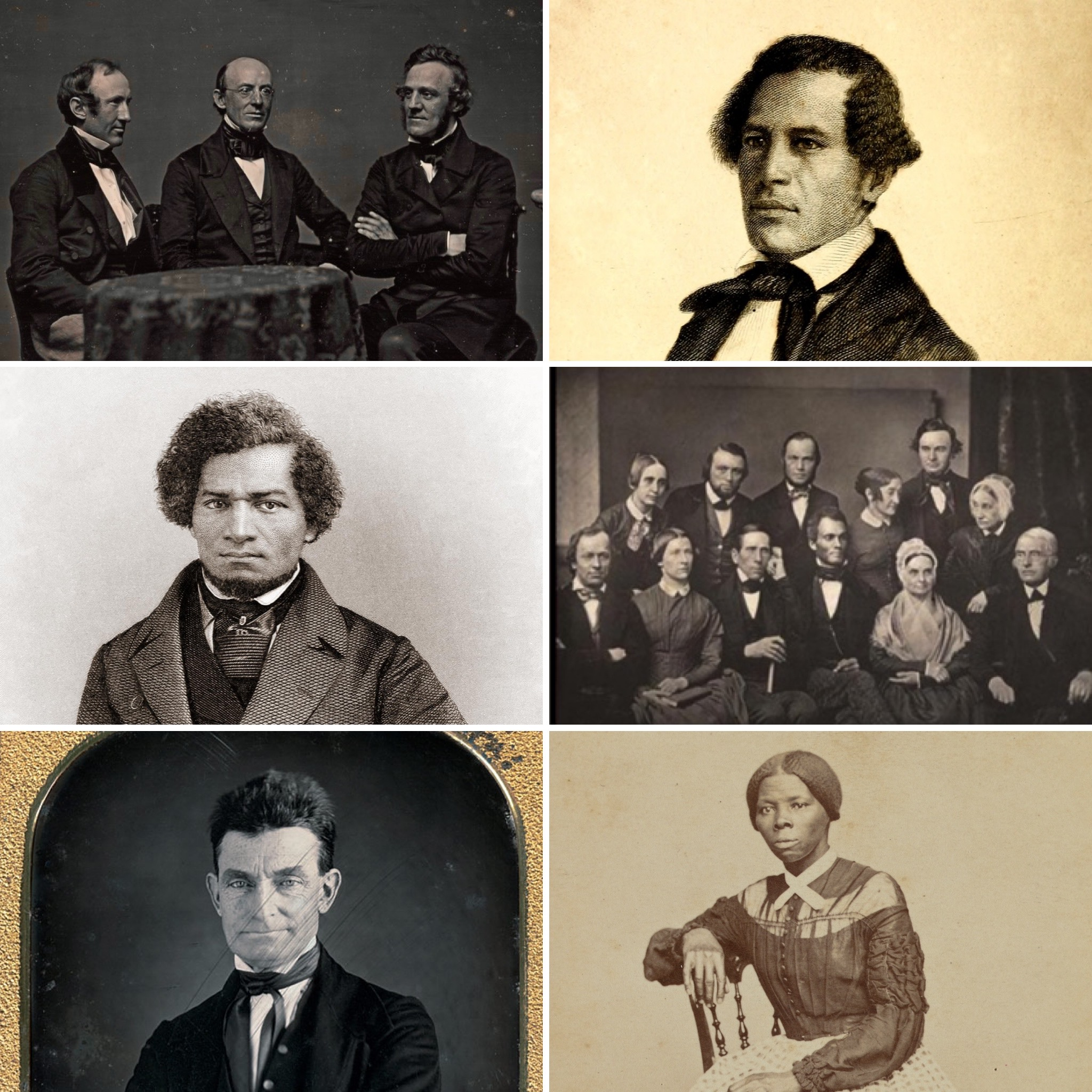
Some 19th-century American abolitionists: Wendell Phillips and William Lloyd Garrison (with British abolitionist George Thompson), William Wells Brown, Frederick Douglass, 1851 meeting of the Pennsylvania Abolition Society (including Oliver Johnson, Mary Grew, Robert Purvis, and Lucretia Mott), John Brown, and Harriet Tubman

Beginning during the Revolution and in the first two decades of the postwar era, every state in the North abolished slavery. These were the first abolitionist laws in the Atlantic World. However, the abolition of slavery did not necessarily mean that existing slaves became free. In some states they were forced to remain with their former owners as indentured servants: free in name only, although they could not be sold and thus families could not be split, and their children were born free. The end of slavery did not come in New York until July 4, 1827, when it was celebrated (on July 5) with a big parade. However, in the 1830 census, the only state with no slaves was Vermont. In the 1840 census, there were still slaves in New Hampshire (1), Rhode Island (5), Connecticut (17), New York (4), Pennsylvania (64), Ohio (3), Indiana (3), Illinois (331), Iowa (16), and Wisconsin (11). There were none in these states in the 1850 census.

Most Northern states passed legislation for gradual abolition, first freeing children born to slave mothers (and requiring them to serve lengthy indentures to their mother's owners, often into their 20s as young adults). In 1845, the Supreme Court of New Jersey received lengthy arguments towards "the deliverance of four thousand persons from bondage". Pennsylvania's last slaves were freed in 1847, Connecticut's in 1848, and while neither New Hampshire nor New Jersey had any slaves in the 1850 Census, and New Jersey only one and New Hampshire none in the 1860 Census, slavery was never prohibited in either state until ratification of the 13th Amendment in 1865 (and New Jersey was one of the last states to ratify it).

None of the Southern states abolished slavery before 1865, but it was not unusual for individual slaveholders in the South to free numerous slaves, often citing revolutionary ideals, in their wills. Methodist, Quaker, and Baptist preachers traveled in the South, appealing to slaveholders to manumit their slaves, and there were "manumission societies" in some Southern states. By 1810, the number and proportion of free blacks in the population of the United States had risen dramatically. Most free blacks lived in the North, but even in the Upper South, the proportion of free blacks went from less than 1% of all blacks to more than 10%, even as the total number of slaves was increasing through imports.

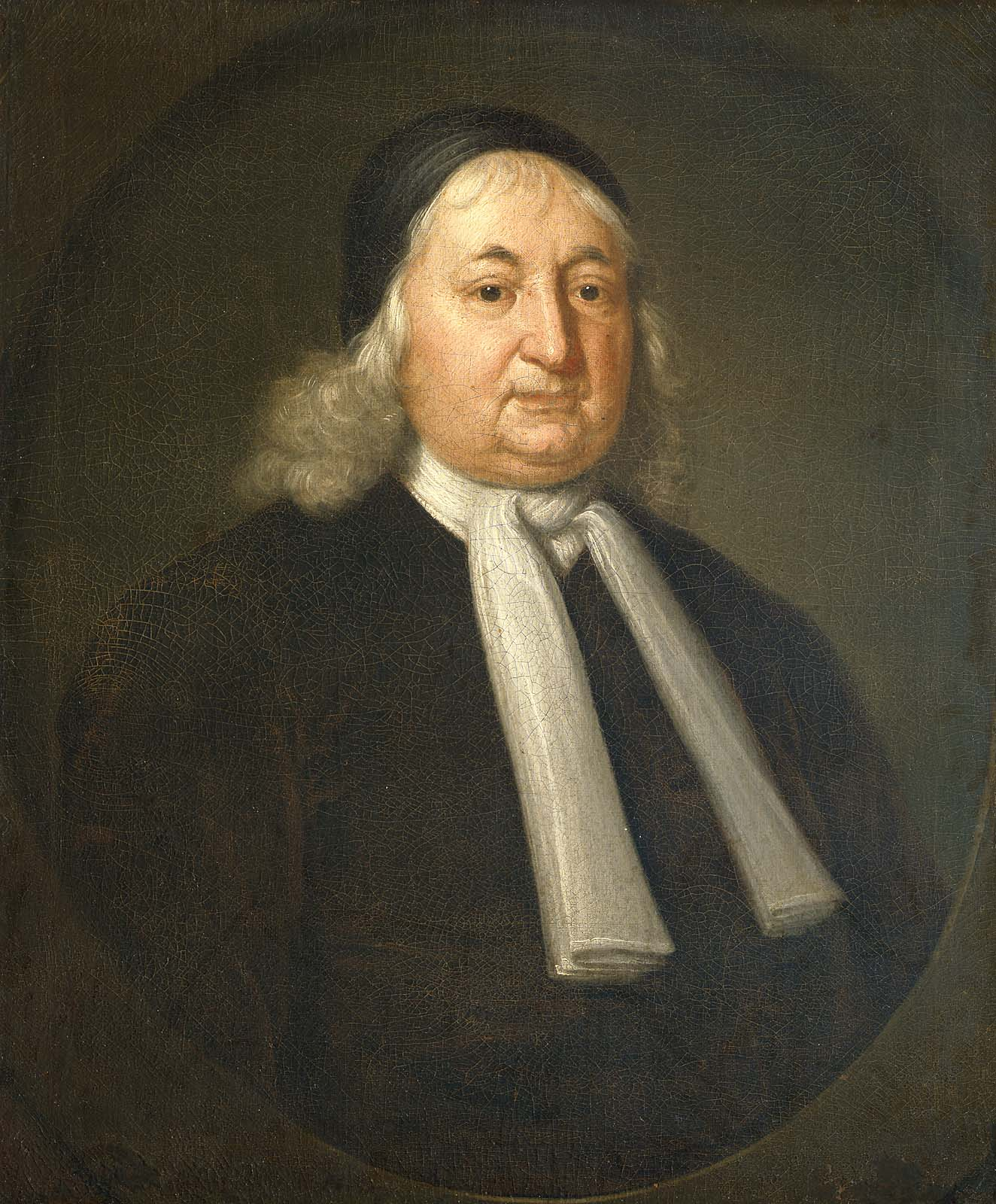
Abolitionist Samuel Sewall was chief justice of the Massachusetts Superior Court of Judicature, the highest court in Massachusetts. (Museum of Fine Arts, Boston, Massachusetts)

African slaves arrived in the Massachusetts Bay Colony in the 1630s, and slavery was legally sanctioned by the Puritans in 1641. Massachusetts residents participated in the slave trade, and laws were passed regulating the movement and marriage among slaves. In 1700, Samuel Sewall, Puritan abolitionist and associate justice of the Massachusetts Superior Court of Judicature, wrote The Selling of Joseph, within which he condemned slavery and the slave trade and refuted many of the era's typical justifications for slavery. The Puritan influence on slavery was still strong at the time of the American Revolution and up until the Civil War. Of America's first seven presidents, the two who did not own slaves, John Adams and his son John Quincy Adams, came from Puritan New England. They were wealthy enough to own slaves, but they chose not to because they believed that it was morally wrong to do so. In 1765, colonial leader Samuel Adams and his wife were given a slave girl as a gift. They immediately freed her.

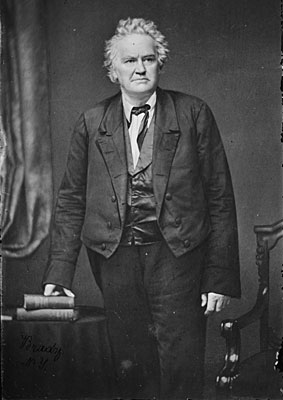
Abolitionist and politician Joshua Reed Giddings was censured in the U.S. House of Representatives in 1842 for introducing anti-slavery resolution deemed to be incendiary, and in violation of the House's gag rule prohibiting discussion of slavery.

In the decades leading up to the Civil War, the abolitionists, such as Theodore Parker, Ralph Waldo Emerson, Henry David Thoreau and Frederick Douglass, repeatedly used the Puritan heritage of the country to bolster their cause. The most radical anti-slavery newspaper, The Liberator, invoked the Puritans and Puritan values over a thousand times. Parker, in urging New England Congressmen to support the abolition of slavery, wrote that "The son of the Puritan ... is sent to Congress to stand up for Truth and Right ..."

Northerners predominated in the westward movement into the Midwestern territory after the American Revolution; as the states were organized, they voted to prohibit slavery in their constitutions when they achieved statehood: Ohio in 1803, Indiana in 1816, and Illinois in 1818. What developed was a Northern block of free states united into one contiguous geographic area that generally shared an anti-slavery culture. The exceptions were the areas along the Ohio River settled by Southerners: the southern portions of Indiana, Ohio, and Illinois. Residents of those areas generally shared in Southern culture and attitudes. In addition, these areas were devoted to agriculture longer than the industrializing northern parts of these states, and some farmers used slave labor. In Illinois, for example, while the trade in slaves was prohibited, it was legal to bring slaves from Kentucky into Illinois and use them there, as long as the slaves left Illinois one day per year (they were "visiting"). The emancipation of slaves in the North led to the growth in the population of Northern free blacks, from several hundred in the 1770s to nearly 50,000 by 1810.

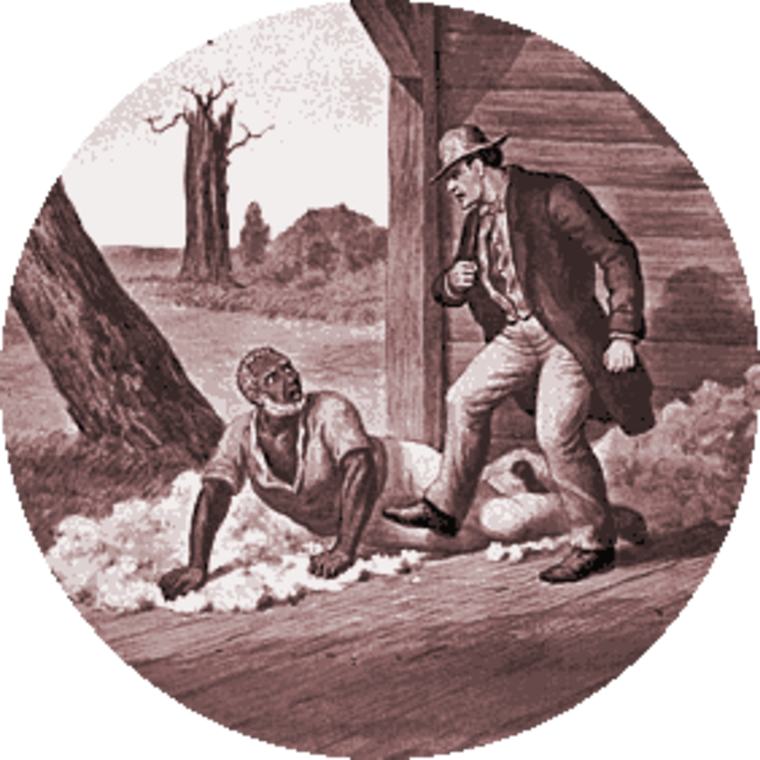
Simon Legree and Uncle Tom: a scene from Uncle Tom's Cabin (1852), an influential abolitionist novel

Throughout the first half of the 19th century, abolitionism, a movement to end slavery, grew in strength; most abolitionist societies and supporters were in the North. They worked to raise awareness about the evils of slavery, and to build support for abolition. After 1830, abolitionist and newspaper publisher William Lloyd Garrison promoted emancipation, characterizing slaveholding as a personal sin. He demanded that slaveowners repent and start the process of emancipation. His position increased defensiveness on the part of some Southerners, who noted the long history of slavery among many cultures. A few abolitionists, such as John Brown, favored the use of armed force to foment uprisings among the slaves, as he attempted to do at Harper's Ferry. Most abolitionists tried to raise public support to change laws and to challenge slave laws. Abolitionists were active on the lecture circuit in the North, and often featured escaped slaves in their presentations. Writer and orator Frederick Douglass became an important abolitionist leader after escaping from slavery. Harriet Beecher Stowe's novel Uncle Tom's Cabin (1852) was an international bestseller, and along with the non-fiction companion A Key to Uncle Tom's Cabin, aroused popular sentiment against slavery. It also provoked the publication of numerous anti-Tom novels by Southerners in the years before the American Civil War.

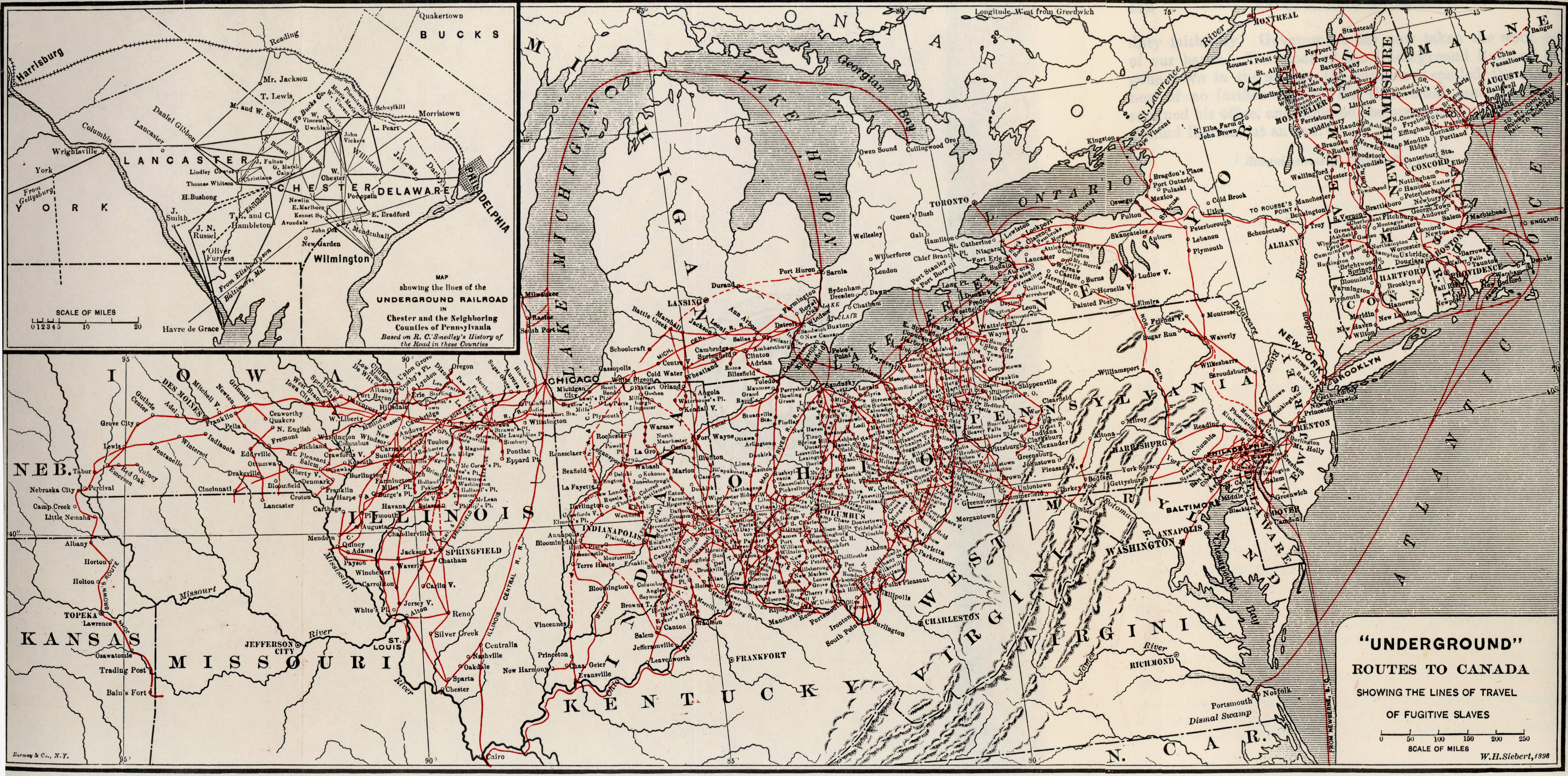
Map of known Underground Railroad routes, as mapped by a historian of 1898

This struggle took place amid strong support for slavery among white Southerners, who profited greatly from the system of enslaved labor. But slavery was entwined with the national economy; for instance, the banking, shipping, insurance, and manufacturing industries of New York City all had strong economic interests in slavery, as did similar industries in other major port cities in the North. The Northern textile mills in New York and New England processed Southern cotton and manufactured clothes to outfit slaves. By 1822, half of New York City's exports were related to cotton.

Slaveholders began to refer to slavery as the "peculiar institution" to differentiate it from other examples of forced labor. They justified it as less cruel than the free labor of the North.

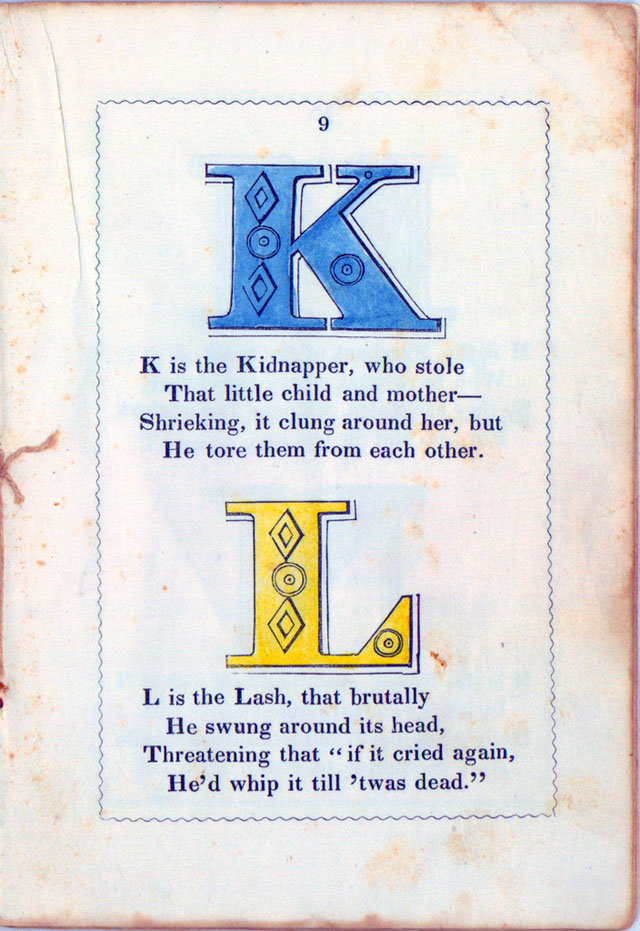
Page from The Anti-Slavery Alphabet (1846–1849)

The principal organized bodies to advocate abolition and anti-slavery reforms in the north were the Pennsylvania Abolition Society and the New York Manumission Society. Before the 1830s the antislavery groups called for gradual emancipation. By the late 1820s, under the impulse of religious evangelicals such as Beriah Green, the sense emerged that owning slaves was a sin and the owner had to immediately free himself from this grave sin by immediate emancipation.

=== Prohibiting the international trade ===
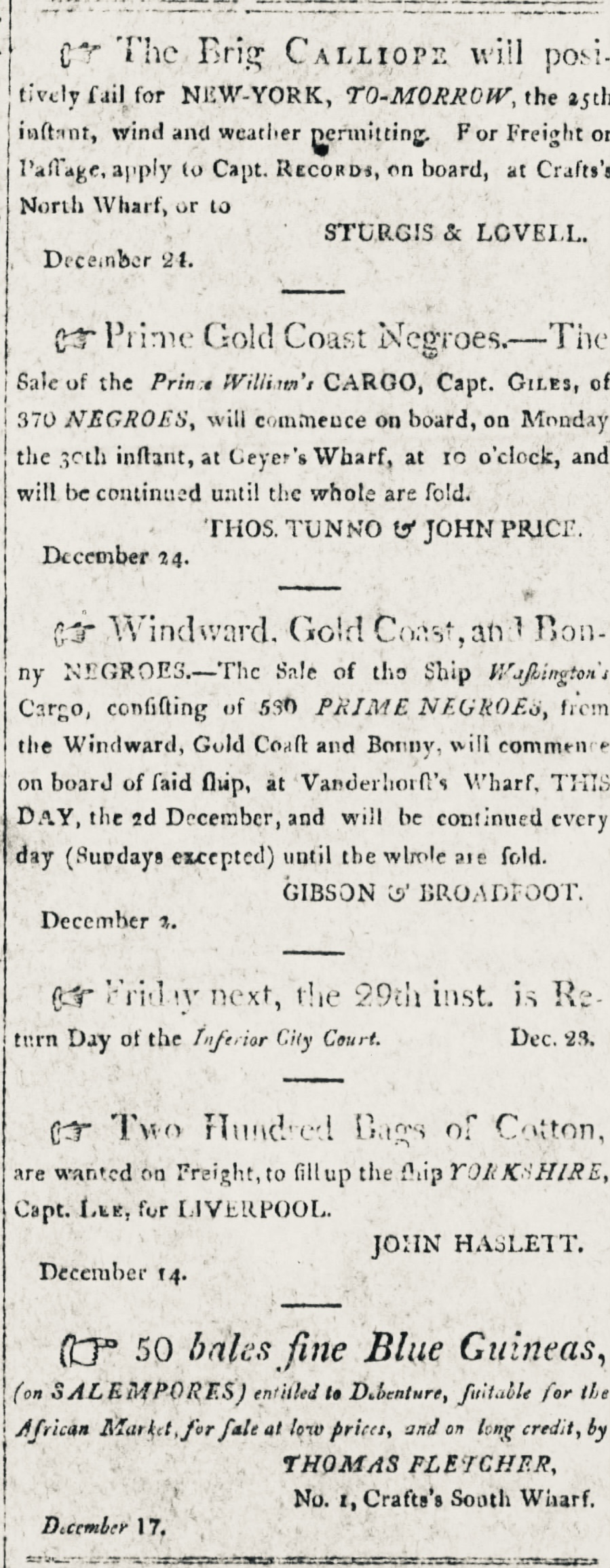
The shipping news in Charleston in December 1805 included 900 newly imported enslaved Africans from the Gold Coast, Windward Coast, and Bonny, plus cotton shipping out for Liverpool, and a delivery of salampore cloth, which was traded for "prime negroes" in regions of Africa where Islamic dietary laws made American rum undesirable

Under the Constitution, Congress could not prohibit the import slave trade that was allowed in South Carolina until 1808. However, the third Congress regulated against it in the Slave Trade Act of 1794, which prohibited American shipbuilding and outfitting for the trade. Subsequent acts in 1800 and 1803 sought to discourage the trade by banning American investment in the trade, and American employment on ships in the trade, as well as prohibiting importation into states that had abolished slavery, which all states except South Carolina had by 1807. The final Act Prohibiting Importation of Slaves was adopted in 1807 and went into effect in 1808. However, illegal importation of African slaves (smuggling) was common. The Cuban slave trade between 1796 and 1807 was dominated by American slave ships. Despite the 1794 Act, Rhode Island slave ship owners found ways to continue supplying the slave-owning states. The overall U.S. slave-ship fleet in 1806 was estimated to be almost 75% the size of that of the British.

After Great Britain and the United States outlawed the international slave trade in 1807, British slave trade suppression activities began in 1808 through diplomatic efforts and the formation of the Royal Navy's West Africa Squadron in 1809. The United States denied the Royal Navy the right to stop and search U.S. ships suspected as slave ships, so not only were American ships unhindered by British patrols, but slavers from other countries would fly the American flag to try to avoid being stopped. Co-operation between the United States and Britain was not possible during the War of 1812 or the period of poor relations in the following years. In 1820, the United States Navy sent USS Cyane under the command of Captain Edward Trenchard to patrol the slave coasts of West Africa. Cyane seized four American slave ships in her first year on station. Trenchard developed a good level of co-operation with the Royal Navy. Four additional U.S. warships were sent to the African coast in 1820 and 1821. A total of 11 American slave ships were taken by the U.S. Navy over this period. Then American enforcement activity reduced. There was still no agreement between the United States and Britain on a mutual right to board suspected slave traders sailing under each other's flag. Attempts to reach such an agreement stalled in 1821 and 1824 in the United States Senate. A U.S. Navy presence, however sporadic, did result in American slavers sailing under the Spanish flag, but still as an extensive trade. The Webster-Ashburton Treaty of 1842 set a guaranteed minimum level of patrol activity by the U.S. Navy and the Royal Navy, and formalized the level of co-operation that had existed in 1820. Its effects, however, were minimal (Note: The United States continued to prohibit Royal Navy ships from investigating U.S.-flagged vessels – even in instances when the U.S. flag was being used fraudulently. The British still insisted on the right to impress (i.e. force to serve in the Royal Navy) British citizens found on American ships – something that was a continued cause of grievance. Despite the intent of the treaty, the opportunity for additional co-operation was missed.) while opportunities for greater co-operation were not taken. The U.S. transatlantic slave trade was not effectively suppressed until 1861, during Lincoln's presidency, when a treaty with Britain was signed whose provisions included allowing the Royal Navy to board, search and arrest slavers operating under the American flag.

=== War of 1812 ===
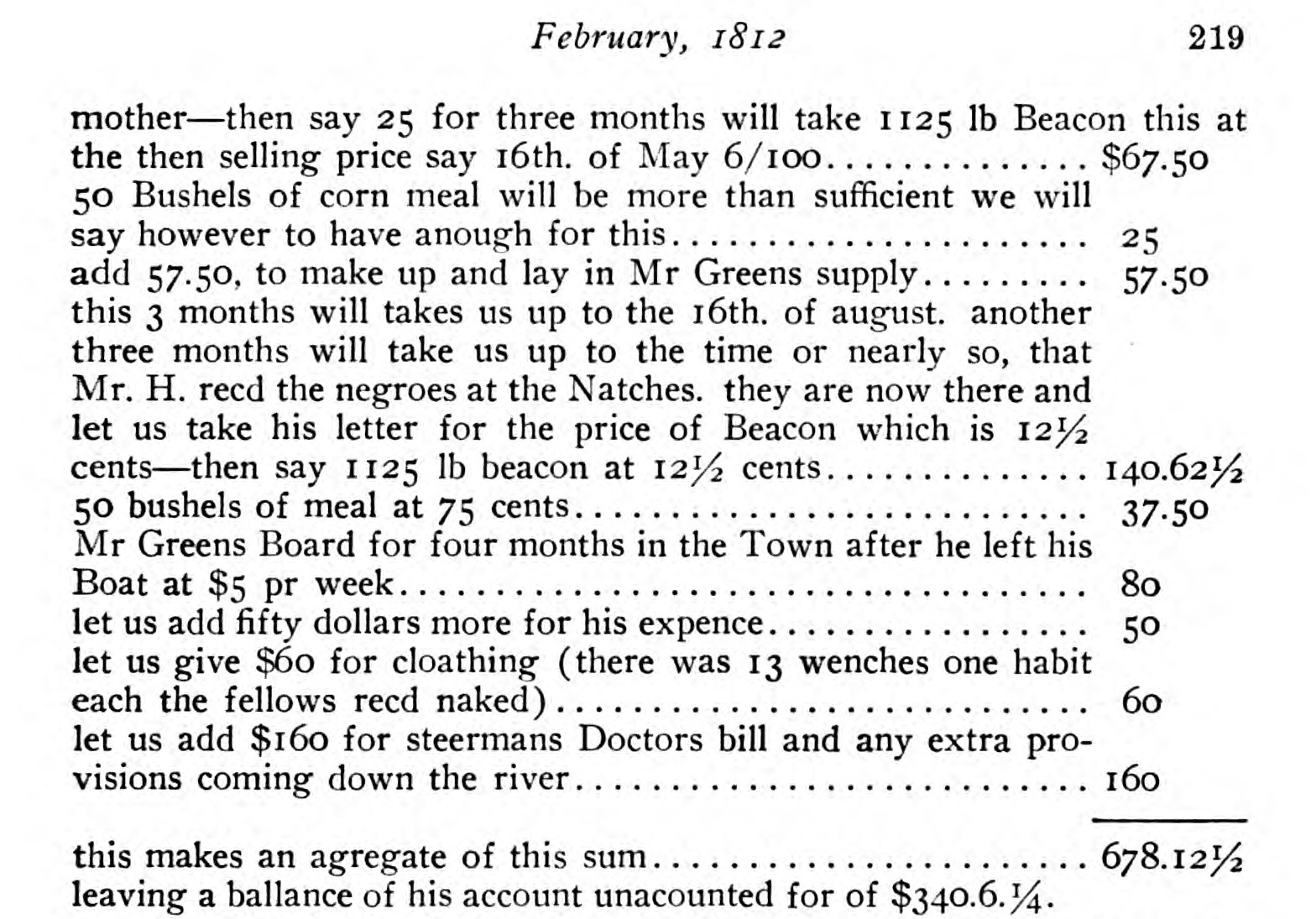
Andrew Jackson and the slave trade in the United States: Jackson, soon to be the "Hero of New Orleans", explains how much it should cost to take a shipment of slaves to Natchez for sale ( The Correspondence of Andrew Jackson, 1926)

During the War of 1812, British Royal Navy commanders of the blockading fleet were instructed to offer freedom to defecting American slaves, as the Crown had during the Revolutionary War. Thousands of escaped slaves went over to the Crown with their families. Men were recruited into the Corps of Colonial Marines on occupied Tangier Island, in the Chesapeake Bay. Many freed American slaves were recruited directly into existing West Indian regiments, or newly created British Army units. The British later resettled a few thousand freed slaves to Nova Scotia. Their descendants, together with descendants of the black people resettled there after the Revolution, have established the Black Loyalist Heritage Museum.

Slaveholders, primarily in the South, had considerable "loss of property" as thousands of slaves escaped to the British lines or ships for freedom, despite the difficulties. The planters' complacency about slave "contentment" was shocked by seeing that slaves would risk so much to be free. Afterward, when some freed slaves had been settled at Bermuda, slaveholders such as Major Pierce Butler of South Carolina tried to persuade them to return to the United States, to no avail.

The Americans protested that Britain's failure to return all slaves violated the Treaty of Ghent. After arbitration by the Tsar of Russia, the British paid $1,204,960 in damages (about $34.3 million in today's money) to Washington, which reimbursed the slaveowners.

=== Slave rebellions ===
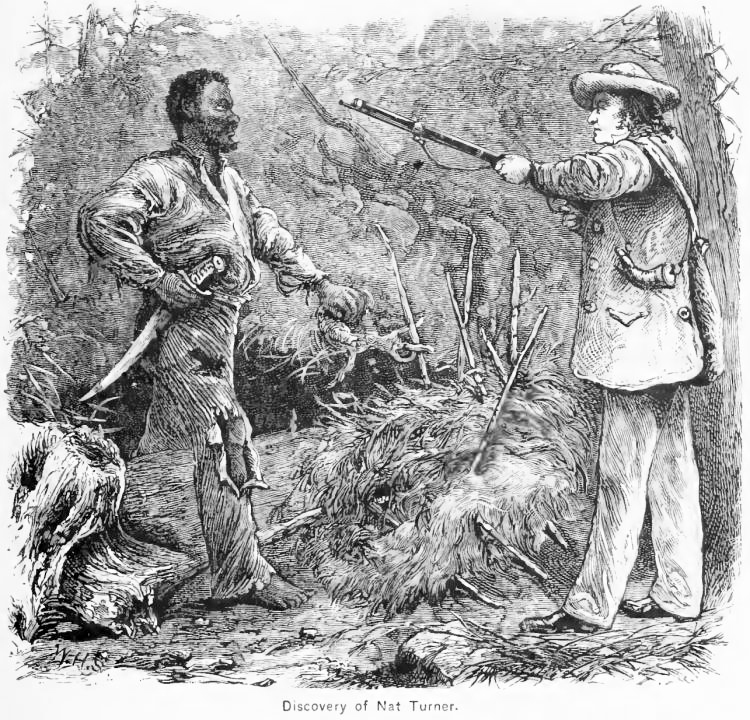
Discovery of Nat Turner [in 1831], an 1881 wood-engraving by William Henry Shelton

According to Herbert Aptheker, "there were few phases of ante-bellum Southern life and history that were not in some way influenced by the fear of, or the actual outbreak of, militant concerted slave action."

Historians in the 20th century identified 250 to 311 slave uprisings in U.S. and colonial history. Those after 1776 include:

- Gabriel's conspiracy (1800)
- Igbo Landing slave escape and mass suicide (1803)
- Chatham Manor Rebellion (1805)
- 1811 German Coast uprising (1811)
- George Boxley Rebellion (1815)
- Denmark Vesey's conspiracy (1822)
- Ohio River slave rebellion (1826)
- Nat Turner's Rebellion (1831)
- Black Seminole Slave Rebellion (1835–1838)
- Amistad seizure (1839)
- 1842 Slave Revolt in the Cherokee Nation
- Charleston Workhouse Slave Rebellion (1849)

In 1831, Nat Turner, a literate slave who claimed to have spiritual visions, organized a slave rebellion in Southampton County, Virginia; it was sometimes called the Southampton Insurrection. Turner and his followers killed nearly sixty white inhabitants, mostly women and children. Many of the men in the area were attending a religious event in North Carolina. Eventually Turner was captured with 17 other rebels, who were subdued by the militia. Turner and his followers were hanged, and Turner's body was flayed. In a frenzy of fear and retaliation, the militia killed more than 100 slaves who had not been involved in the rebellion. Planters whipped hundreds of innocent slaves to ensure resistance was quelled.

This rebellion prompted Virginia and other slave states to pass more restrictions on slaves and free people of color, controlling their movement and requiring more white supervision of gatherings. In 1835, North Carolina withdrew the franchise for free people of color, and they lost their vote.

There are four known mutinies on vessels involved in the coastwise slave trade: Decatur (1826), Governor Strong (1826), Lafayette (1829), and the Creole (1841).

=== Post-revolution Southern manumissions ===
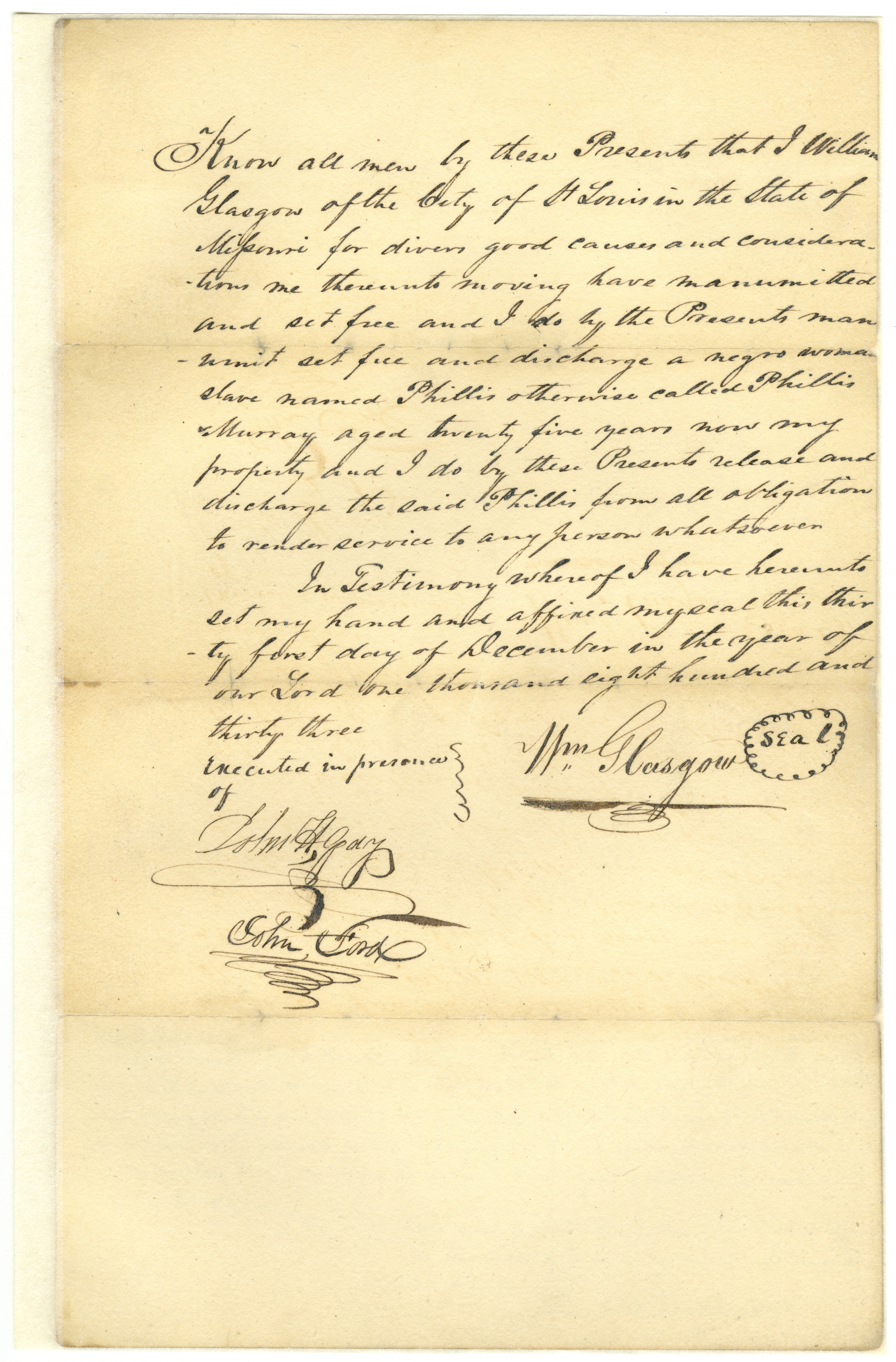
Manumission papers of Phillis Murray, a black woman about 25 years old, signed by William Glasgow, December 31, 1833 (Missouri History Museum)

Although Virginia, Maryland and Delaware were slave states, the latter two already had a high proportion of free blacks by the outbreak of war. Following the Revolution, the three legislatures made manumission easier, allowing it by deed or will. Quaker and Methodist ministers in particular urged slaveholders to free their slaves. The number and proportion of freed slaves in these states rose dramatically until 1810. More than half of the number of free blacks in the United States were concentrated in the Upper South. The proportion of free blacks among the black population in the Upper South rose from less than 1% in 1792 to more than 10% by 1810. In Delaware, nearly 75% of black people were free by 1810.

In the United States as a whole, by 1810 the number of free blacks reached 186,446, or 13.5% of all black people. After that period, few slaves were freed, as the development of cotton plantations featuring short-staple cotton in the Deep South drove up the internal demand for slaves in the domestic slave trade and high prices being paid for them.

Alabama banned free black people from the state beginning in 1834; free people of color who crossed the state line were subject to enslavement. Free black people in Arkansas after 1843 had to buy a $500 good-behavior bond, and no unenslaved black person was legally allowed to move into the state.

=== Female slave owners ===
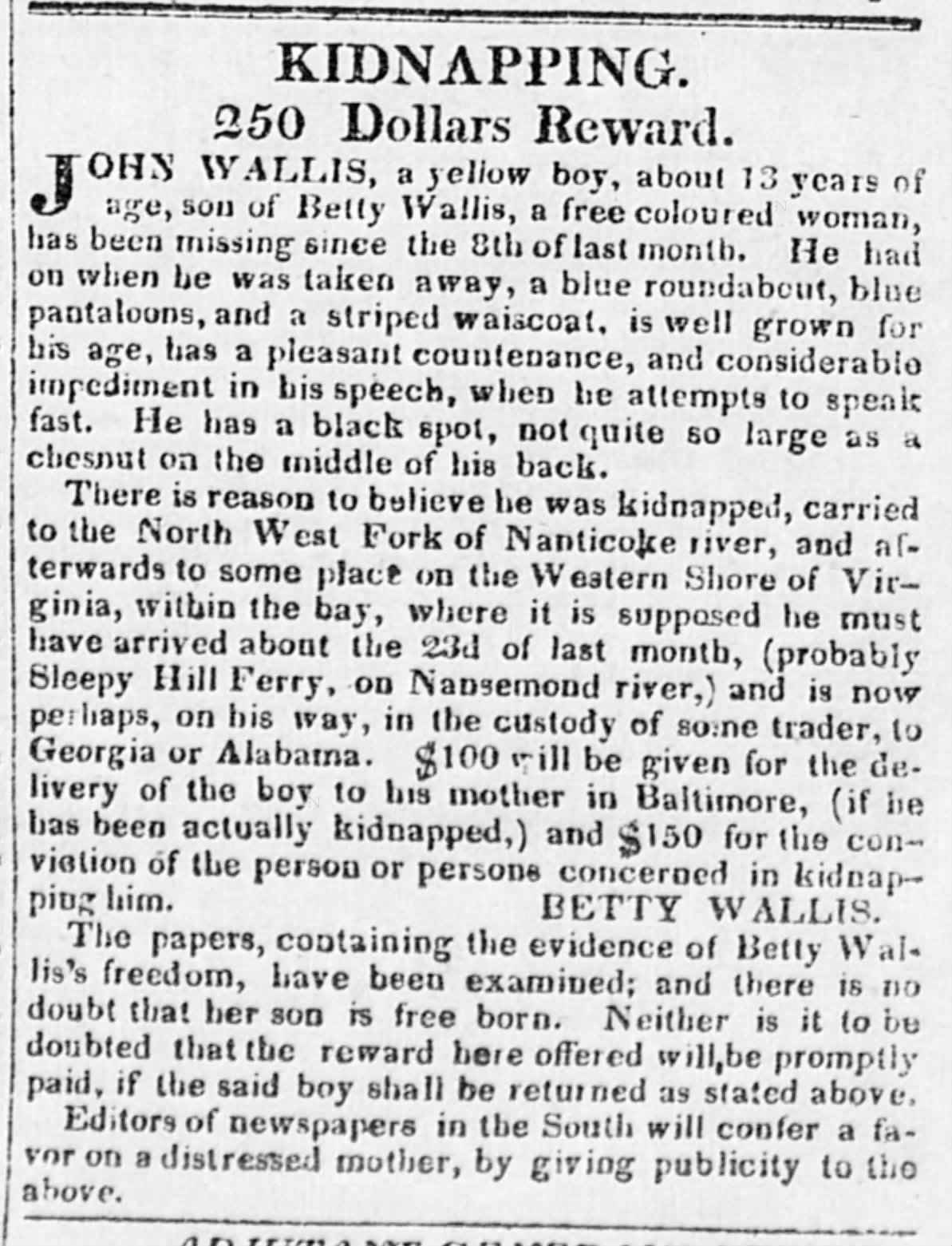
The slave trade made kidnapping children of color a profitable criminal business—the Patty Cannon gang was at work in Northwest Fork Hundred, Delaware until 1829, when four bodies were found buried on property they had owned ("Kidnapping 250 Dollars Reward" Constitutional Whig, April 27, 1827)

Despite coverture laws that gave the property of married women to their husbands, married women exercised their right to own and control human property without their husbands' interference or permission, and they were active participants in the slave trade. For example, in South Carolina 40% of bills of sale for slaves from the 1700s to the present included a female buyer or seller. Women also governed their slaves in a manner similar to men, engaging in the same levels of physical disciplining. Like men, they brought lawsuits against those who jeopardized their ownership to their slaves.

=== Black slave owners ===
Despite the longstanding color line in the United States, some African Americans were slave owners themselves, some in cities and others as plantation owners in the country. Slave ownership signified both wealth and increased social status. Black slave owners were uncommon, however, as "of the two and a half million African Americans living in the United States in 1850, the vast majority [were] enslaved."

=== Native American slave owners ===
After 1800, some of the Cherokee and the other four civilized tribes of the Southeast started buying and using black slaves as labor. They continued this practice after removal to Indian Territory in the 1830s, when as many as 15,000 enslaved blacks were taken with them.

The nature of slavery in Cherokee society often mirrored that of white slave-owning society. The law barred intermarriage of Cherokees and enslaved African Americans, but Cherokee men had unions with enslaved women, resulting in mixed-race children. Cherokee who aided slaves were punished with one hundred lashes on the back. In Cherokee society, persons of African descent were barred from holding office even if they were also racially and culturally Cherokee. They were also barred from bearing arms and owning property. The Cherokee prohibited the teaching of African Americans to read and write.

By contrast, the Seminole welcomed into their nation African Americans who had escaped slavery (Black Seminoles). Historically, the Black Seminoles lived mostly in distinct bands near the Native American Seminole. Some were held as slaves of particular Seminole leaders. Seminole practice in Florida had acknowledged slavery, though not the chattel slavery model common elsewhere. It was, in fact, more like feudal dependency and taxation. The relationship between Seminole blacks and natives changed following their relocation in the 1830s to territory controlled by the Creek who had a system of chattel slavery. Pro slavery pressure from Creek and pro-Creek Seminole and slave raiding led to many Black Seminoles escaping to Mexico.

=== High demand and smuggling ===
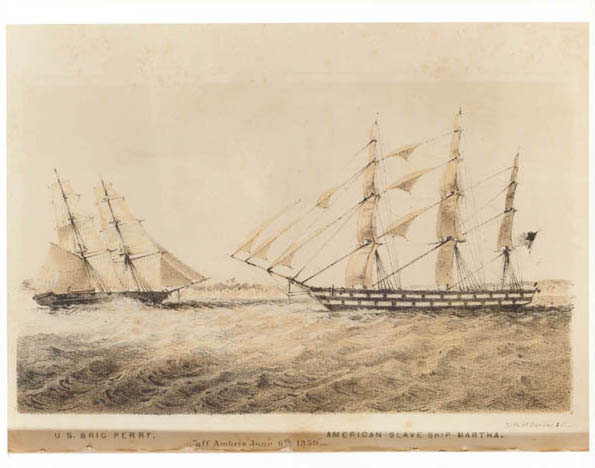
U.S. brig Perry confronting the slave ship Martha off Ambriz on June 6, 1850 (Sarony & Co. lithograph, Andrew H. Foote's Africa and the American Flag, 1854)

The United States Constitution, adopted in 1787, prevented Congress from completely banning the importation of slaves until 1808, although Congress regulated against the trade in the Slave Trade Act of 1794, and in subsequent Acts in 1800 and 1803. During and after the Revolution, the states individually passed laws against importing slaves. By contrast, the states of Georgia and South Carolina reopened their trade due to demand by their upland planters, who were developing new cotton plantations: Georgia from 1800 until December 31, 1807, and South Carolina from 1804. In that period, Charleston traders imported about 75,000 slaves, more than were brought to South Carolina in the 75 years before the Revolution. Approximately 30,000 were imported to Georgia.

By January 1, 1808, when Congress banned further imports, South Carolina was the only state that still allowed importation of enslaved people. The domestic trade became extremely profitable as demand rose with the expansion of cultivation in the Deep South for cotton and sugar cane crops. Slavery in the United States became, more or less, self-sustaining by natural increase among the current slaves and their descendants. Maryland and Virginia viewed themselves as slave producers, seeing "producing slaves" as resembling animal husbandry. Workers, including many children, were relocated by force from the upper to the lower South.

Despite the ban, slave imports continued through smugglers bringing in slaves past the U.S. Navy's African Slave Trade Patrol to South Carolina, and overland from Texas and Florida, both under Spanish control. Congress increased the punishment associated with importing slaves, classifying it in 1820 as an act of piracy, with smugglers subject to harsh penalties, including death if caught. After that, "it is unlikely that more than 10,000 [slaves] were successfully landed in the United States." But, some smuggling of slaves into the United States continued until just before the start of the Civil War.

=== Colonization movement ===
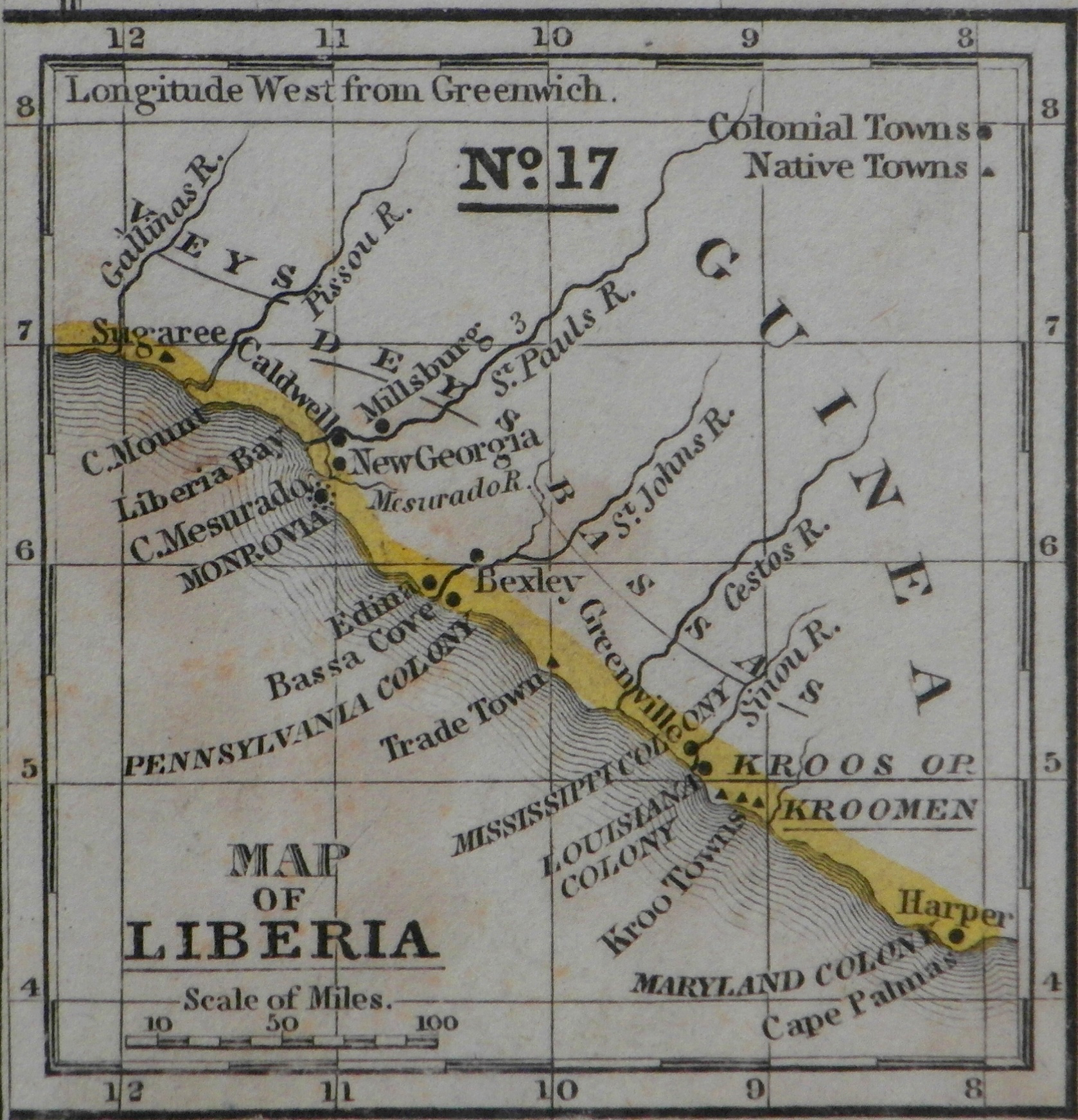
The 1839 Mitchell map of Liberia shows colonial settlements including New Georgia, Pennsylvania Colony, Mississippi Colony, Louisiana Colony, and Maryland Colony

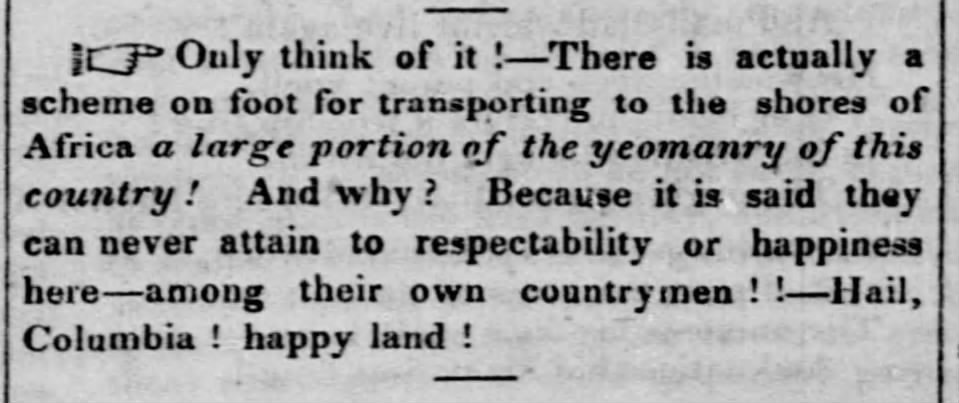
"Only think of it!—There is actually a scheme on foot for transporting to the shores of Africa a large portion of the yeomanry of this country! And why? Because it is said they can never attain to respectability or happiness here—among their own countrymen!!—Hail, Columbia! happy land!" (The Liberator, December 1, 1832)

In the early part of the 19th century, other organizations were founded to take action on the future of black Americans. Some advocated removing free black people from the United States to places where they would enjoy greater freedom; some endorsed colonization in Africa, while others advocated emigration, usually to Haiti. During the 1820s and 1830s, the American Colonization Society (ACS) was the primary organization to implement the "return" of black Americans to Africa. The ACS was made up mostly of Quakers and slaveholders, and they found uneasy common ground in support of what was incorrectly called "repatriation". By this time, however, most black Americans were native-born and did not want to emigrate, saying they were no more African than white Americans were British. Rather, they wanted full rights in the United States, where their families had lived and worked for generations.

In 1822, the ACS and affiliated state societies established what would become the colony of Liberia, in West Africa. The ACS assisted thousands of freedmen and free blacks (with legislated limits) to emigrate there from the United States. Many white people considered this preferable to emancipation in the United States. Henry Clay, one of the founders and a prominent slaveholder politician from Kentucky, said that blacks faced:

...unconquerable prejudice resulting from their color, they never could amalgamate with the free whites of this country. It was desirable, therefore, as it respected them, and the residue of the population of the country, to drain them off.

Deportation would also be a way to prevent reprisals against former slaveholders and white people in general, as had occurred in the 1804 Haiti massacre, which had contributed to a consuming fear amongst whites of retributive black violence, a phobia dubbed Haitianism.

=== Domestic slave trade and forced migration ===
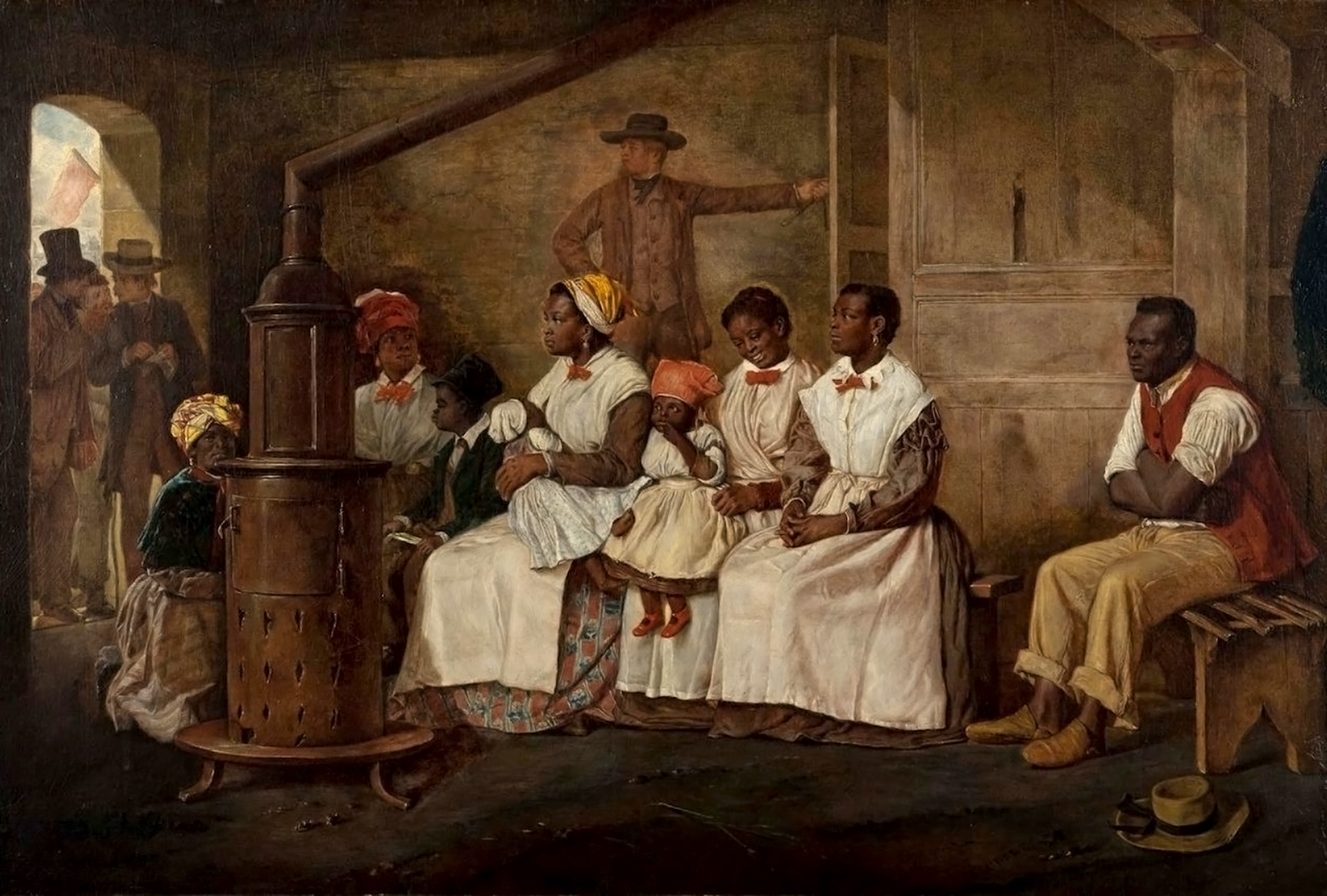
Slaves Waiting for Sale: Richmond, Virginia, painting by Eyre Crowe based on a sketch made 1853 while visiting the United States with William Thackeray

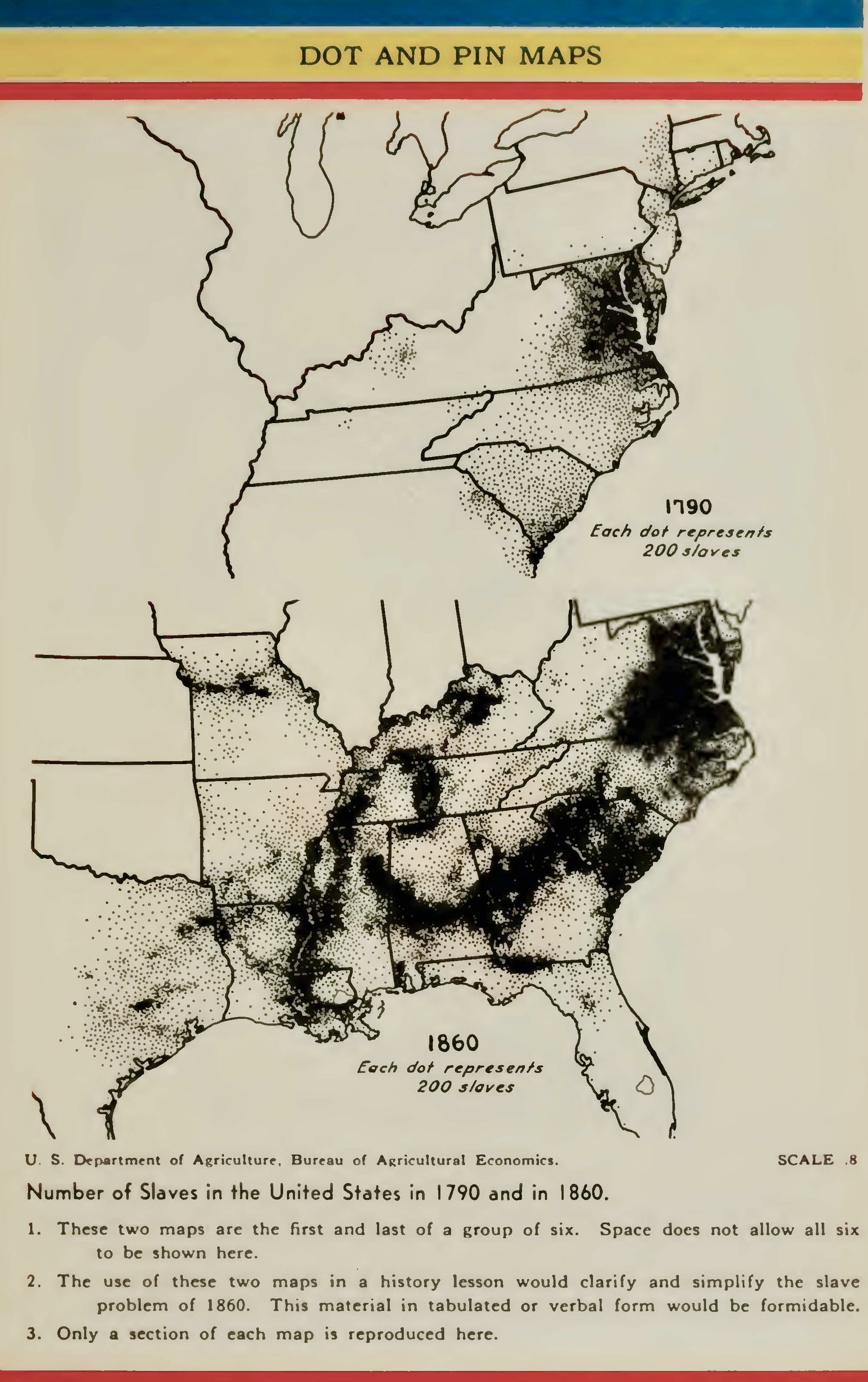
Movement of slaves between 1790 and 1860

The U.S. Constitution barred the federal government from prohibiting the importation of slaves for twenty years. Various states passed bans on the international slave trade during that period; by 1808, the only state still allowing the importation of African slaves was South Carolina. After 1808, legal importation of slaves ceased, although there was smuggling via Spanish Florida and the disputed Gulf Coast to the west. This route all but ended after Florida became a U.S. territory in 1821 (but see slave ships Wanderer and Clotilda).

The replacement for the importation of slaves from abroad was increased domestic production. Virginia and Maryland had little new agricultural development, and their need for slaves was mostly for replacements for decedents. Normal reproduction more than supplied these: Virginia and Maryland had surpluses of slaves. Their tobacco farms were "worn out" and the climate was not suitable for cotton or sugar cane. The surplus was even greater because slaves were encouraged to reproduce (though they could not marry). The pro-slavery Virginian Thomas Roderick Dew wrote in 1832 that Virginia was a "negro-raising state"; i.e. Virginia "produced" slaves. According to him, in 1832 Virginia exported "upwards of 6,000 slaves" per year, "a source of wealth to Virginia". A newspaper from 1836 gives the figure as 40,000, earning for Virginia an estimated $24,000,000 per year. Demand for slaves was the strongest in what was then the southwest of the country: Alabama, Mississippi, and Louisiana, and, later, Texas, Arkansas, and Missouri. Here there was abundant land suitable for plantation agriculture, which young men with some capital established. This was expansion of the white, monied population: younger men seeking their fortune.

The most valuable crop that could be grown on a plantation in that climate was cotton. That crop was labor-intensive, and the least-costly laborers were slaves. Demand for slaves exceeded the supply in the southwest; therefore slaves, never cheap if they were productive, went for a higher price. As portrayed in Uncle Tom's Cabin (the "original" cabin was in Maryland), "selling South" was greatly feared. A recently (2018) publicized example of the practice of "selling South" is the 1838 sale by Jesuits of 272 slaves from Maryland, to plantations in Louisiana, to benefit Georgetown University, which has been described as "ow[ing] its existence" to this transaction.

The growing international demand for cotton led many plantation owners further west in search of suitable land. In addition, the invention of the cotton gin in 1793 enabled profitable processing of short-staple cotton, which could readily be grown in the uplands. The invention revolutionized the cotton industry by increasing fifty-fold the quantity of cotton that could be processed in a day. At the end of the War of 1812, fewer than 300,000 bales of cotton were produced nationally. By 1820, the amount of cotton produced had increased to 600,000 bales, and by 1850 it had reached 4,000,000. There was an explosive growth of cotton cultivation throughout the Deep South and greatly increased demand for slave labor to support it. As a result, manumissions decreased dramatically in the South.

Through the domestic slave trade, about one million enslaved African Americans were forcibly removed from the Upper South to the Deep South, with some transported by ship in the coastwise trade. In 1834, Alabama, Mississippi, and Louisiana grew half the nation's cotton; by 1859, along with Georgia, they grew 78%. By 1859, cotton growth in the Carolinas had fallen to just 10% of the national total.

Most of the slaves sold from the Upper South were from Maryland, Virginia and the Carolinas, where changes in agriculture decreased the need for their labor and the demand for slaves. Before 1810, primary destinations for the slaves who were sold were Kentucky and Tennessee, but, after 1810, the Deep South states of Georgia, Alabama, Mississippi, Louisiana and Texas received the most slaves. This is where cotton became "king". Meanwhile, the Upper South states of Kentucky and Tennessee joined the slave-exporting states.

By 1815, the domestic slave trade had become a major economic activity in the United States; it lasted until the 1860s. Between 1830 and 1840, nearly 250,000 slaves were taken across state lines. In the 1850s, more than 193,000 enslaved persons were transported, and historians estimate nearly one million in total took part in the forced migration of this new "Middle Passage". By 1860, the slave population in the United States had reached four million. Of the 1,515,605 free families in the fifteen slave states in 1860, nearly 400,000 held slaves (roughly one in four, or 25%), amounting to 8% of all American families.

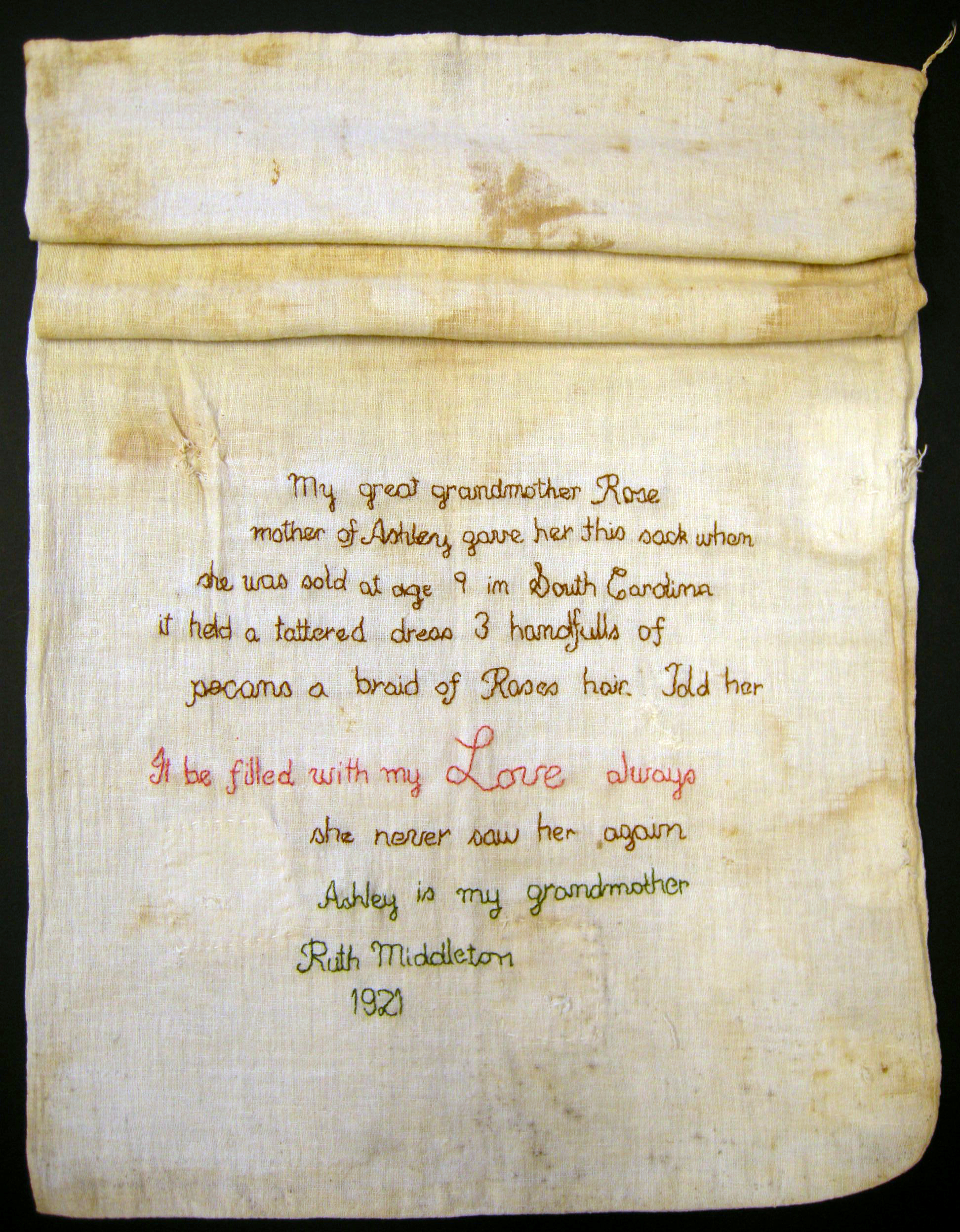
Ashley's Sack is a cloth that recounts a slave sale separating a mother and her daughter. The sack belonged to a nine-year-old girl Ashley and was a parting gift from her mother, Rose, after Ashley had been sold. Rose filled the sack with a dress, braid of her hair, pecans, and "my love always". (Middleton Place Foundation, South Carolina)

The historian Ira Berlin called this forced migration of slaves the "Second Middle Passage" because it reproduced many of the same horrors as the Middle Passage (the name given to the transportation of slaves from Africa to North America). These sales of slaves broke up many families and caused much hardship. Characterizing it as the "central event" in the life of a slave between the American Revolution and the Civil War, Berlin wrote that, whether slaves were directly uprooted or lived in fear that they or their families would be involuntarily moved, "the massive deportation traumatized black people, both slave and free". Individuals lost their connection to families and clans. Added to the earlier colonists combining slaves from different tribes, many ethnic Africans lost their knowledge of varying tribal origins in Africa. Most were descended from families that had been in the United States for many generations.

The firm of Franklin and Armfield was a leader in this trade. In the 1840s, almost 300,000 slaves were transported, with Alabama and Mississippi receiving 100,000 each. During each decade between 1810 and 1860, at least 100,000 slaves were moved from their state of origin. In the final decade before the Civil War, 250,000 were transported. Michael Tadman wrote in Speculators and Slaves: Masters, Traders, and Slaves in the Old South (1989) that 60–70% of inter-regional migrations were the result of the sale of slaves. In 1820, a slave child in the Upper South had a 30% chance of being sold South by 1860. The death rate for the slaves on their way to their new destination across the American South was less than that suffered by captives shipped across the Atlantic Ocean, but mortality nevertheless was higher than the normal death rate.

Slave traders transported two-thirds of the slaves who moved West. Only a minority moved with their families and existing master. Slave traders had little interest in purchasing or transporting intact slave families; in the early years, planters demanded only the young male slaves needed for heavy labor. Later, in the interest of creating a "self-reproducing labor force", planters purchased nearly equal numbers of men and women. Berlin wrote: "The internal slave trade became the largest enterprise in the South outside of the plantation itself, and probably the most advanced in its employment of modern transportation, finance, and publicity. It developed its own language: prime hands, bucks, breeding wenches, and fancy girls."

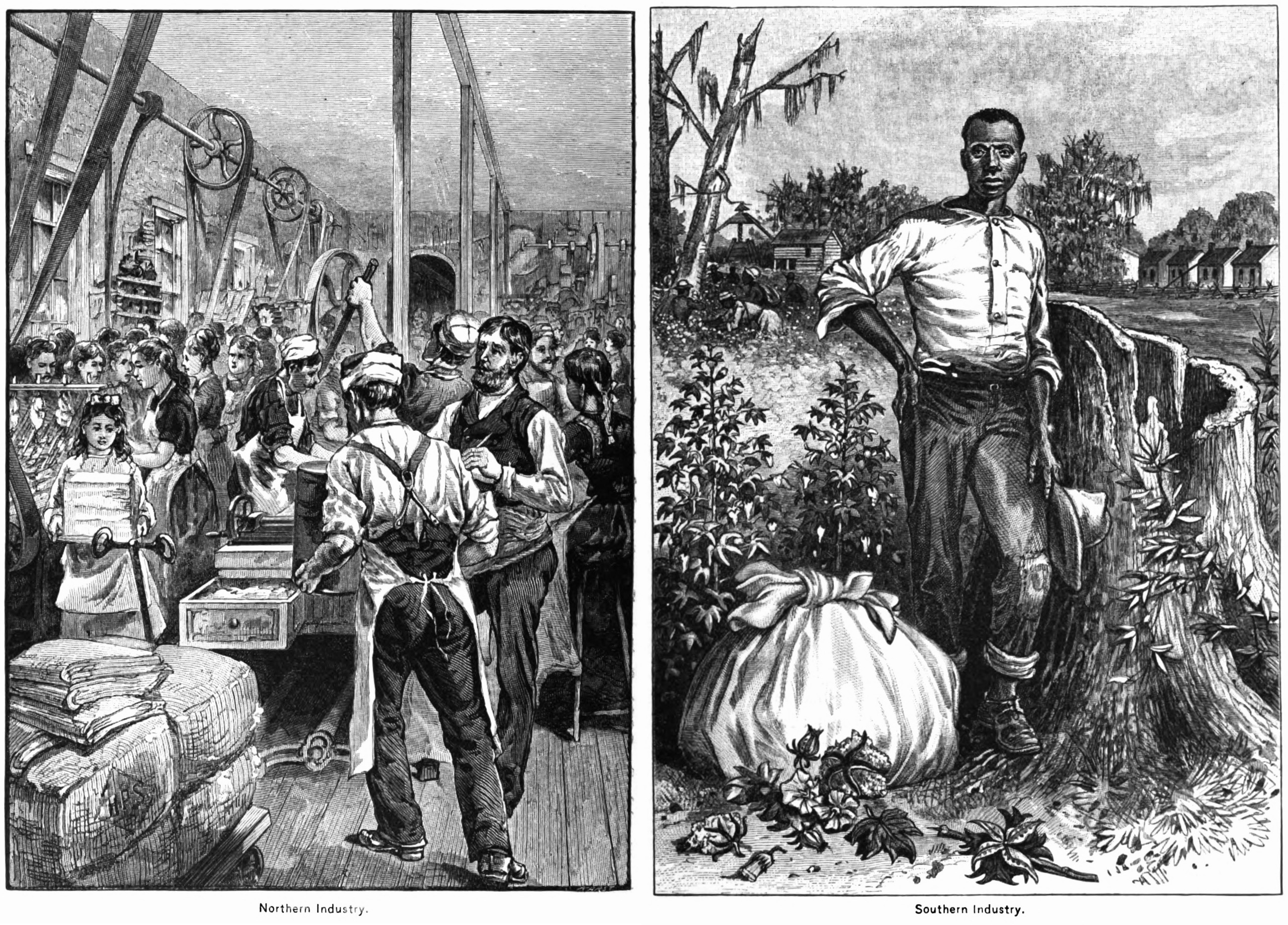
"Northern Industry" and "Southern Industry" before the American Civil War (Scribner's Popular History of the United States, 1896)

The expansion of the interstate slave trade contributed to the "economic revival of once depressed seaboard states" as demand accelerated the value of slaves who were subject to sale. Some traders moved their "chattels" by sea, with Norfolk to New Orleans the most common route, but most slaves were forced to walk overland. Others were shipped downriver from such markets as Louisville on the Ohio River and Natchez on the Mississippi. Traders created regular migration routes served by a network of slave pens, yards and warehouses needed as temporary housing for the slaves. In addition, other vendors provided clothes, food and supplies for slaves. As the trek advanced, some slaves were sold and new ones purchased. Berlin concluded, "In all, the slave trade, with its hubs and regional centers, its spurs and circuits, reached into every cranny of southern society. Few southerners, black or white, were untouched."

Once the trip ended, slaves faced a life on the frontier significantly different from most labor in the Upper South. Clearing trees and starting crops on virgin fields was harsh and backbreaking work. A combination of inadequate nutrition, bad water and exhaustion from both the journey and the work weakened the newly arrived slaves and produced casualties. New plantations were built at rivers' edges for ease of transportation and travel. Mosquitoes and other environmental challenges spread disease, which killed many slaves. They had acquired only limited immunity to lowland diseases in their previous homes. The death rate was so high that, in the first few years of hewing a plantation out of the wilderness, some planters preferred when possible to use rented slaves rather than their own.

The frontier's harsh conditions increased slave resistance and led owners and overseers to rely on violence for control. Many of the slaves were new to cotton fields and unaccustomed to the "sunrise-to-sunset gang labor" their new life required. Slaves were driven much harder than when they had been growing tobacco or wheat back East. Slaves had less time and opportunity to improve their quality of life by raising their own livestock or tending vegetable gardens, for either their own consumption or trade, than they did in the East.

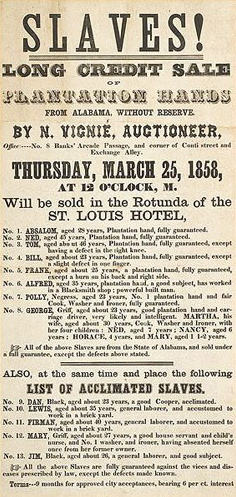
Broadside for an 1858 slave sale at the St. Louis Hotel in New Orleans (Museum of African American History and Culture 2011.155.305)

In Louisiana, French colonists had established sugar cane plantations and exported sugar as the chief commodity crop. After the Louisiana Purchase in 1803, Americans entered the state and joined the sugar cultivation. Between 1810 and 1830, planters bought slaves from the North and the number of slaves increased from fewer than 10,000 to more than 42,000. Planters preferred young males, who represented two-thirds of the slave purchases. Dealing with sugar cane was even more physically demanding than growing cotton. The largely young, unmarried male slave force made the reliance on violence by the owners "especially savage".

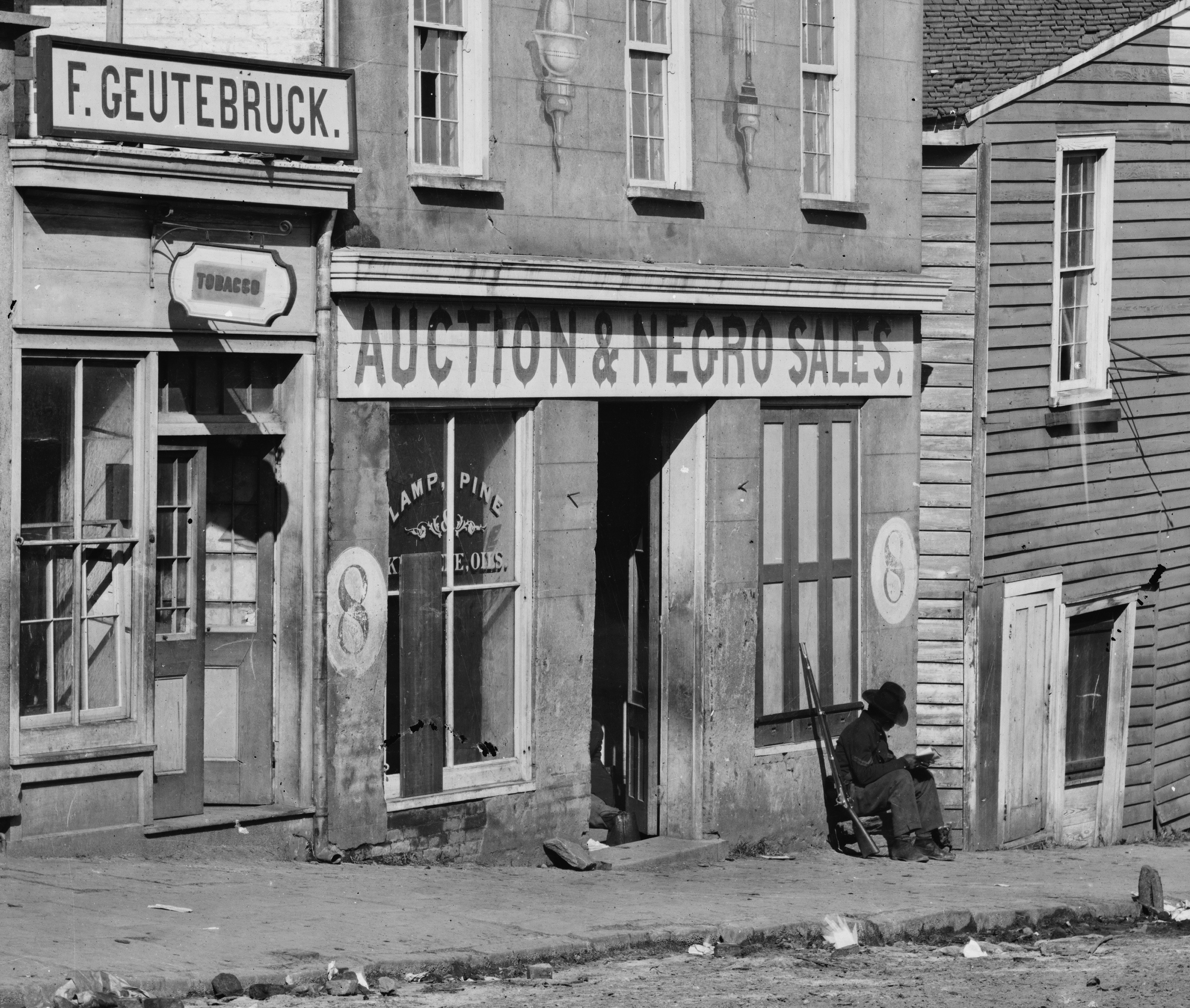
Crawford, Frazer & Co., a slave trading business in Georgia, photographed by George N. Barnard just before the 1864 burning of Atlanta

New Orleans became nationally important as a slave market and port, as slaves were shipped from there upriver by steamboat to plantations on the Mississippi River; it also sold slaves who had been shipped downriver from markets such as Louisville. By 1840, the New Orleans slave market was North America's largest. It became the wealthiest and the fourth-largest city in the nation, thanks chiefly to the slave trade and associated businesses. The trading season was from September to May, after the harvest.

The notion that slave traders were social outcasts of low reputation, even in the South, was initially promulgated by defensive southerners and later by figures like historian Ulrich Bonnell Phillips. Historian Frederic Bancroft, author of Slave-Trading in the Old South (1931) found—contrary to Phillips's position—that many traders were esteemed members of their communities. Contemporary researcher Steven Deyle argues that the "trader's position in society was not unproblematic and owners who dealt with the trader felt the need to satisfy themselves that they acted honorably"; Michael Tadman contends that "'trader as outcast' operated at the level of propaganda" whereas white slave owners almost universally professed a belief that slaves were not human like them, and thus dismissed the consequences of slave trading as beneath consideration. Similarly, historian Charles B. Dew read hundreds of letters to slave traders and found virtually zero narrative evidence for guilt, shame, or contrition about the slave trade: "If you begin with the absolute belief in white supremacy—unquestioned white superiority/unquestioned black inferiority—everything falls neatly into place: the African is inferior racial 'stock,' living in sin and ignorance and barbarism and heathenism on the 'Dark Continent' until enslaved...Slavery thus miraculously becomes a form of 'uplift' for this supposedly benighted and brutish race of people. And once notions of white supremacy and black inferiority are in place in the American South, they are passed on from one generation to the next with all the certainty and inevitability of a genetic trait."

In the 1828 presidential election, candidate Andrew Jackson was strongly criticized by opponents as a slave trader who transacted in slaves in defiance of modern standards or morality.

=== Treatment ===
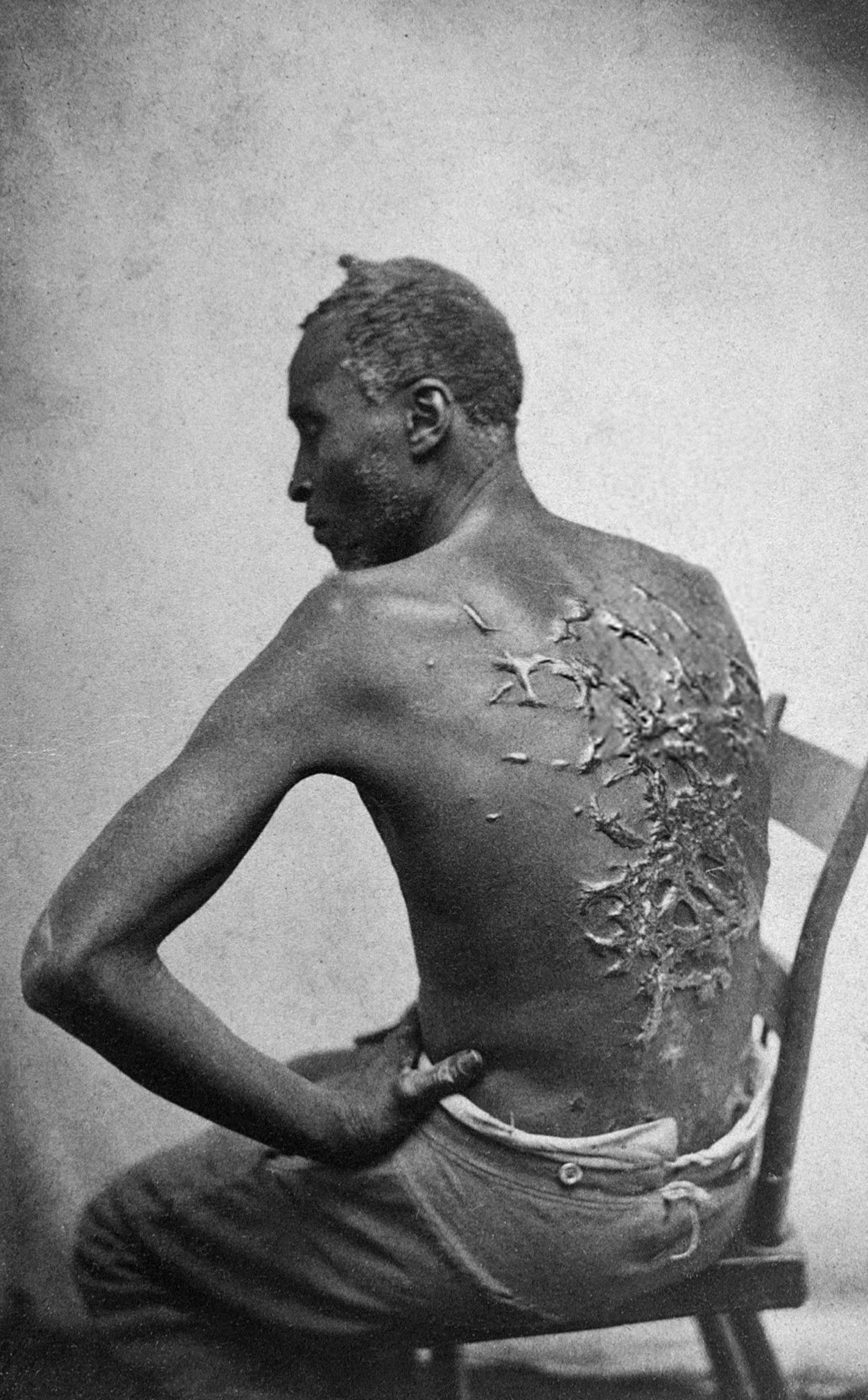
Peter, formerly enslaved on a cotton plantation along the Atchafalaya River, photo taken at Baton Rouge, Louisiana, 1863; after the whipping, Peter's wounds were salted, a common practice; the overseer who whipped Peter was fired by slave owner Capt. John Lyons (original carte de visite by McPherson & Oliver)

The treatment of slaves in the United States varied widely depending on conditions, time, and place, but in general it was brutal, especially on plantations. Whippings and rape were routine. The power relationships of slavery corrupted many whites that had authority over slaves, with children showing their own cruelty. Masters and overseers resorted to physical punishments to impose their wills. Slaves were punished by whipping, shackling, hanging, beating, burning, mutilation, branding and imprisonment. Punishment was most often meted out in response to disobedience or perceived infractions, but sometimes abuse was carried out to re-assert the dominance of the master or overseer of the slave. Treatment was usually harsher on large plantations, which were often managed by overseers and owned by absentee slaveholders, conditions permitting abuses.

William Wells Brown, who escaped to freedom, reported that on one plantation, slave men were required to pick eighty pounds of cotton per day, while women were required to pick seventy pounds per day; if any slave failed in his or her quota, they were subject to one lash of the whip for each pound that they were short. The whipping post stood next to the cotton scales. A New York man who attended a slave auction in the mid-19th century reported that at least three-quarters of the male slaves he saw at sale had scars on their backs from whipping. By contrast, small slave-owning families had closer relationships between the owners and slaves; this sometimes resulted in a more humane environment but was not a given.

Historian Lawrence M. Friedman wrote: "Ten Southern codes made it a crime to mistreat a slave. ... Under the Louisiana Civil Code of 1825 (art. 192), if a master was "convicted of cruel treatment", the judge could order the sale of the mistreated slave, presumably to a better master. Masters and overseers were seldom prosecuted under these laws. No slave could give testimony in the courts.

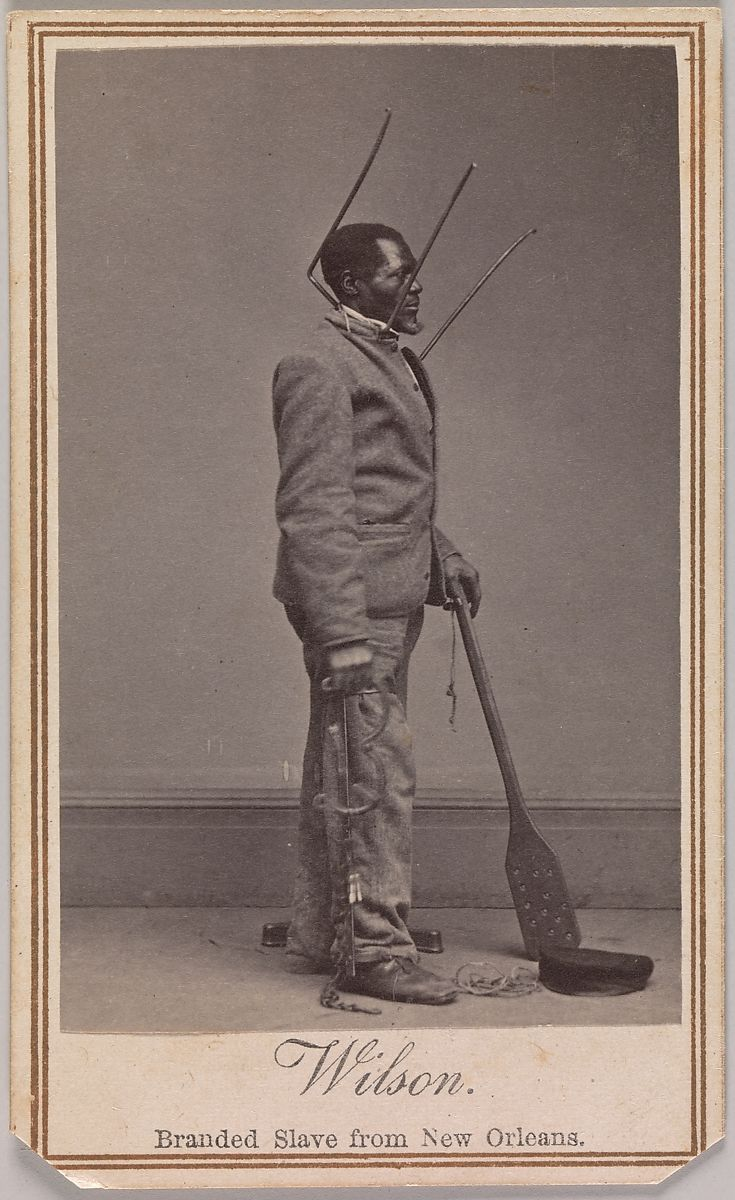
Wilson Chinn, a branded slave from Louisiana—also exhibiting instruments of torture used to punish slaves (carte de visite by Charles Paxson, Metropolitan Museum of Art 2019.521)

According to Adalberto Aguirre's research, 1,161 slaves were executed in the United States between the 1790s and 1850s. Quick executions of innocent slaves as well as suspects typically followed any attempted slave rebellions, as white militias overreacted with widespread killings that expressed their fears of rebellions, or suspected rebellions.

Although most slaves had lives that were very restricted in terms of their movements and agency, exceptions existed to virtually every generalization; for instance, there were also slaves who had considerable freedom in their daily lives: slaves allowed to rent out their labor and who might live independently of their master in cities, slaves who employed white workers, and slave doctors who treated upper-class white patients. After 1820, in response to the inability to import new slaves from Africa and in part to abolitionist criticism, some slaveholders improved the living conditions of their slaves, to encourage them to be productive and to try to prevent escapes. It was part of a paternalistic approach in the antebellum era that was encouraged by ministers trying to use Christianity to improve the treatment of slaves. Slaveholders published articles in Southern agricultural journals to share best practices in treatment and management of slaves; they intended to show that their system was better than the living conditions of Northern industrial workers.

Medical care for slaves was limited in terms of the medical knowledge available to anyone. It was generally provided by other slaves or by slaveholders' family members, although sometimes "plantation physicians", like J. Marion Sims, were called by the owners to protect their investment by treating sick slaves. Many slaves possessed medical skills needed to tend to each other, and used folk remedies brought from Africa. They also developed new remedies based on American plants and herbs.

An estimated 9% of slaves were disabled due to a physical, sensory, psychological, neurological, or developmental condition. But slaves were often described as disabled if they could not work or bear a child, and often subjected to harsh treatment as a result.

In some cases, enslaved persons were cruelly tortured to death as punishment while other slaves had to watch. According to Andrew Fede, an owner could be held criminally liable for killing a slave only if the slave he killed was "completely submissive and under the master's absolute control". For example, in 1791 the North Carolina General Assembly defined the willful killing of a slave as criminal murder, unless done in resisting or under moderate correction (that is, corporal punishment).

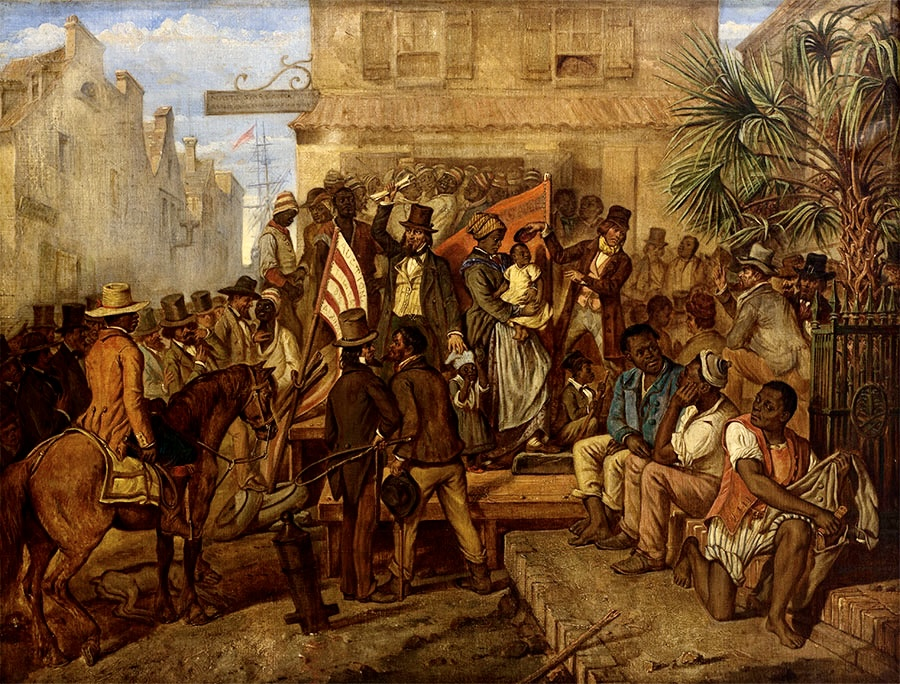
Sale at auction, by Alonzo J. White on the plaza north of the Exchange Building in Charleston on March 10, 1853, of 96 people who had previously been enslaved near the Combahee River (Eyre Crowe, Museo Nacional de Bellas Artes, Havana, Cuba)

While slaves' living conditions were poor by modern standards, Robert Fogel argued that all workers, free or slave, during the first half of the 19th century were subject to hardship. Unlike free individuals, however, enslaved people were far more likely to be underfed, physically punished, sexually abused, or killed, with no recourse, legal or otherwise, against those who perpetrated these crimes against them.

=== Commodification of human tissue ===
In a very grim fashion, the commodification of the human body was legal in the case of African slaves as they were not legally seen as fully human. The most popular means of commodifying slave tissues was through medical experimentation. Slaves were routinely used as medical specimens forced to take part in experimental surgeries, amputations, disease research, and developing medical techniques. Many slaves in these routine experiments were not given pain relief or analgesics, resulting in death by shock on the table. The bodies of such slaves were grouped with other medical cadavers, or sold with the bodies of other slaves sold, stolen, or grave robbed for medical experimentation. In many cases, slave cadavers were used in demonstrations and dissection tables, oftentimes resulting in their tissues being sold for profit.

For the reason of slave punishment, decoration, or self-expression, the skin of slaves was in many instances allowed to be made into leather for furniture, accessories, and clothing, a common instance of which being that of wealthy clientele sending cadaver skin to tanners and shoemakers under the guise of animal leather. Slave hair could be shaved and used for stuffing in pillows and furniture. In some instances, the inner body tissue of slaves (fat, bones, etc.) could be made into soap, medicinal grease, trophies, and other commodities.

=== Sexual abuse, reproductive exploitation, and breeding farms ===
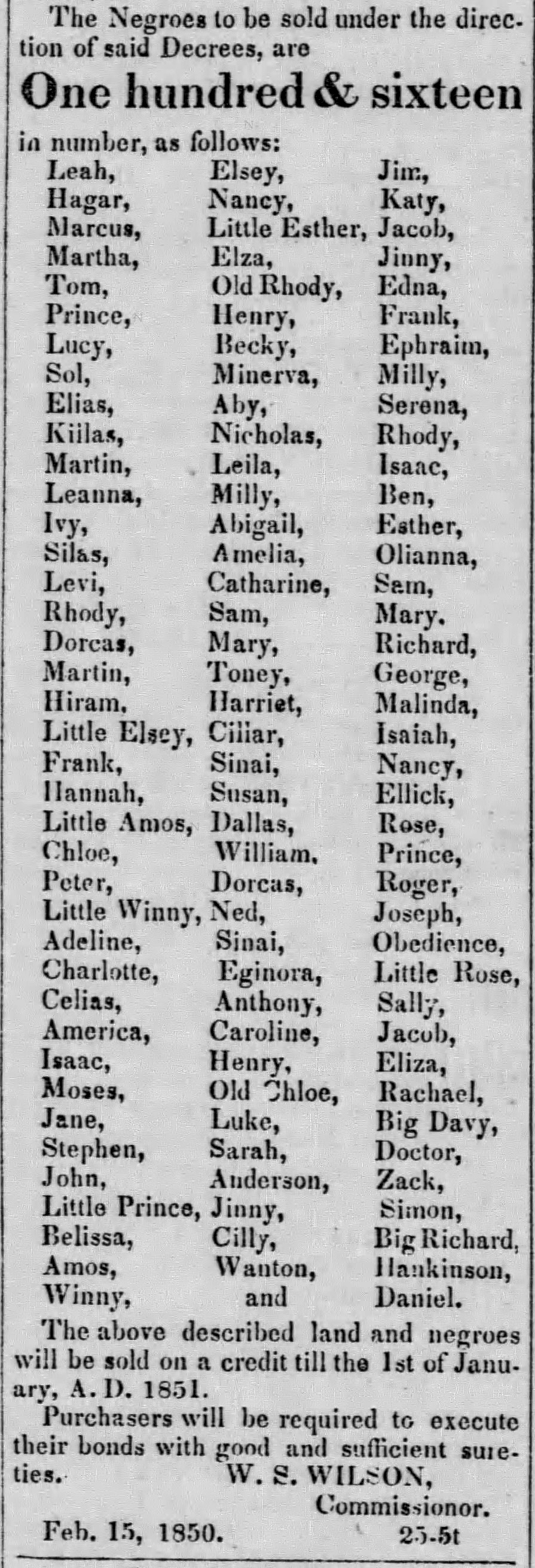
"The negroes to be sold" including America and Obedience, The Port Gibson Herald, March 1, 1850

As in any slave society, slave women in the United States were at high risk of rape and sexual exploitation, due to their owners' rights over their bodies. Their children were repeatedly taken away from them and sold as chattel; usually they never saw each other again. Many slaves fought back against sexual attacks, and some died resisting. Others carried psychological and physical scars from the attacks. Sexual abuse of slaves was partially rooted in a patriarchal Southern culture that treated black women as property or chattel. Southern culture strongly policed against sexual relations between white women and black men on the purported grounds of racial purity but, by the late 18th century, the many mixed-race slaves and slave children showed that white men had often taken advantage of slave women. Wealthy planter widowers, notably such as John Wayles and his son-in-law Thomas Jefferson, took slave women as concubines; each had six children with his partner: Elizabeth Hemings and her daughter Sally Hemings (the half-sister of Jefferson's late wife), respectively. Both Mary Chesnut and Fanny Kemble, wives of planters, wrote about this issue in the antebellum South in the decades before the Civil War. Sometimes planters used mixed-race slaves as house servants or favored artisans because they were their children or other relatives.

While publicly opposed to race mixing, in his Notes on the State of Virginia published in 1785, Jefferson wrote: "The improvement of the blacks in body and mind, in the first instance of their mixture with the whites, has been observed by every one, and proves that their inferiority is not the effect merely of their condition of life". Historians estimate that 58% of enslaved women in the U.S. aged 15–30 years were sexually assaulted by their slave owners and other white men. As a result of centuries of slavery and such relationships, DNA studies have shown that the vast majority of African Americans also have historic European ancestry, generally through paternal lines. The average Black American genome is roughly 20-25% European, and it is estimated that as much as one third of their Y chromosomes are of European origin.

Portrayals of black men as hypersexual and savage, along with ideals of protecting white women, were predominant during this time and masked the experiences of sexual violence faced by black male slaves, especially by white women. Subject not only to rape and sexual exploitation, slaves faced sexual violence in many forms. A black man could be forced by his slaveowner to rape another slave or even a free black woman. Forced pairings with other slaves, including forced breeding, which neither slave might desire, were common. Despite explicit bans on homosexuality and sodomy, it was not uncommon for male slaves, including children, to be sexually harassed and assaulted by their masters in secret. Through sexual and reproductive abuse slaveowners could further enforce their control over their slaves.

The prohibition on the importation of slaves into the United States after 1808 limited the supply of slaves in the United States. This came at a time when the invention of the cotton gin enabled the expansion of cultivation in the uplands of short-staple cotton, leading to clearing lands cultivating cotton through large areas of the Deep South, especially the Black Belt. The demand for labor in the area increased sharply and led to an expansion of the internal slave market. At the same time, the Upper South had an excess number of slaves because of a shift to mixed-crops agriculture, which was less labor-intensive than tobacco. To add to the supply of slaves, slaveholders looked at the fertility of slave women as part of their productivity, and intermittently forced the women to have large numbers of children. During this time period, the terms "breeders", "breeding slaves", "child bearing women", "breeding period", and "too old to breed" became familiar.

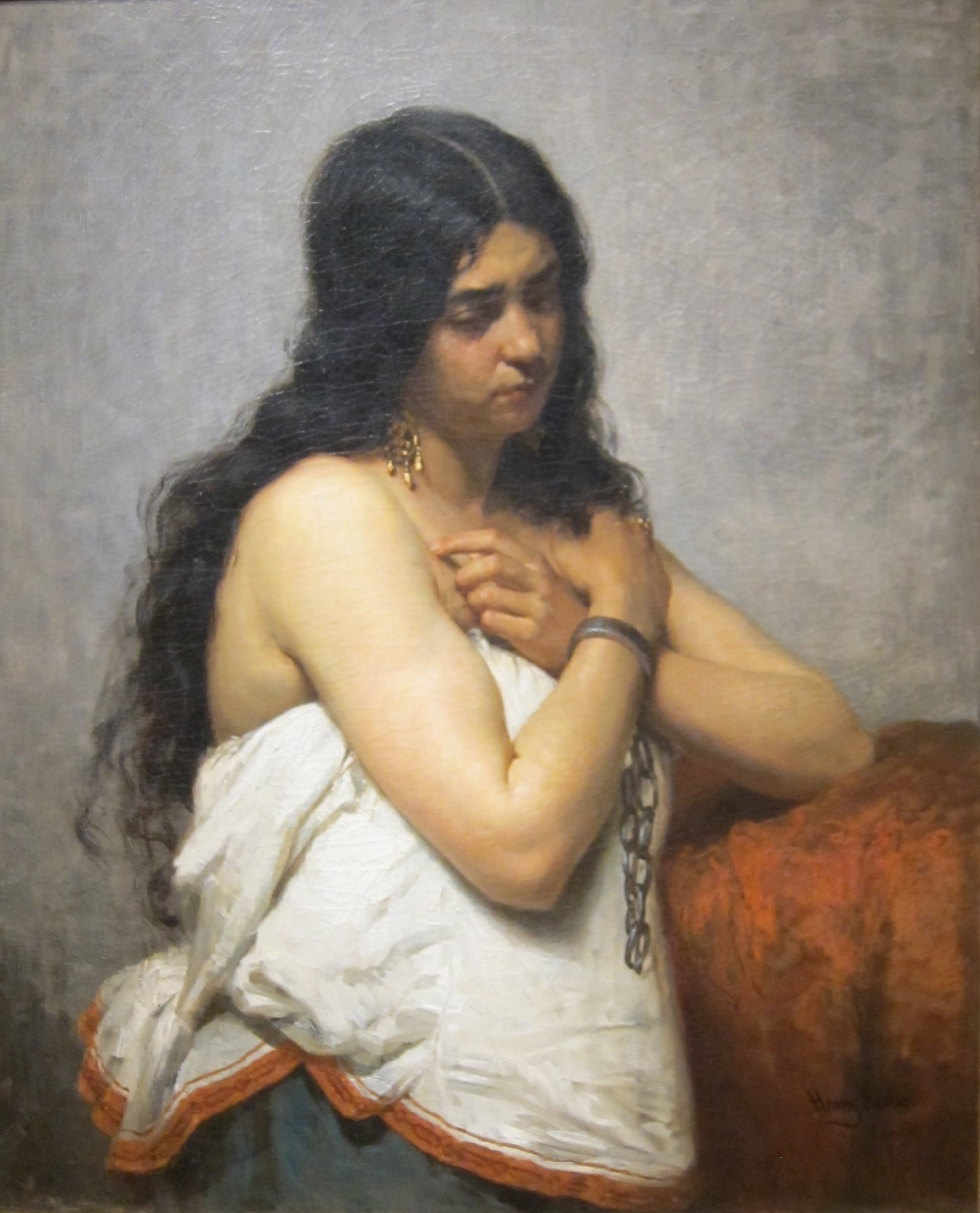
The Quadroon Girl (1878) oil painting by Henry Mosler; scholars of slavery have described the image of the "quadroon bride" and the Southern "fixation on interracial sex and violence" as a form of folk pornography (Cincinnati Art Museum 1976.25)

In the United States in the early 19th century, owners of female slaves could freely and legally use them as sexual objects. This follows free use of female slaves on slaving vessels by the crews.

The slaveholder has it in his power, to violate the chastity of his slaves. And not a few are beastly enough to exercise such power. Hence it happens that, in some families, it is difficult to distinguish the free children from the slaves. It is sometimes the case, that the largest part of the master's own children are born, not of his wife, but of the wives and daughters of his slaves, whom he has basely prostituted as well as enslaved.

One commentator complained: "This vice, this bane of society, has already become so common, that it is scarcely esteemed a disgrace."

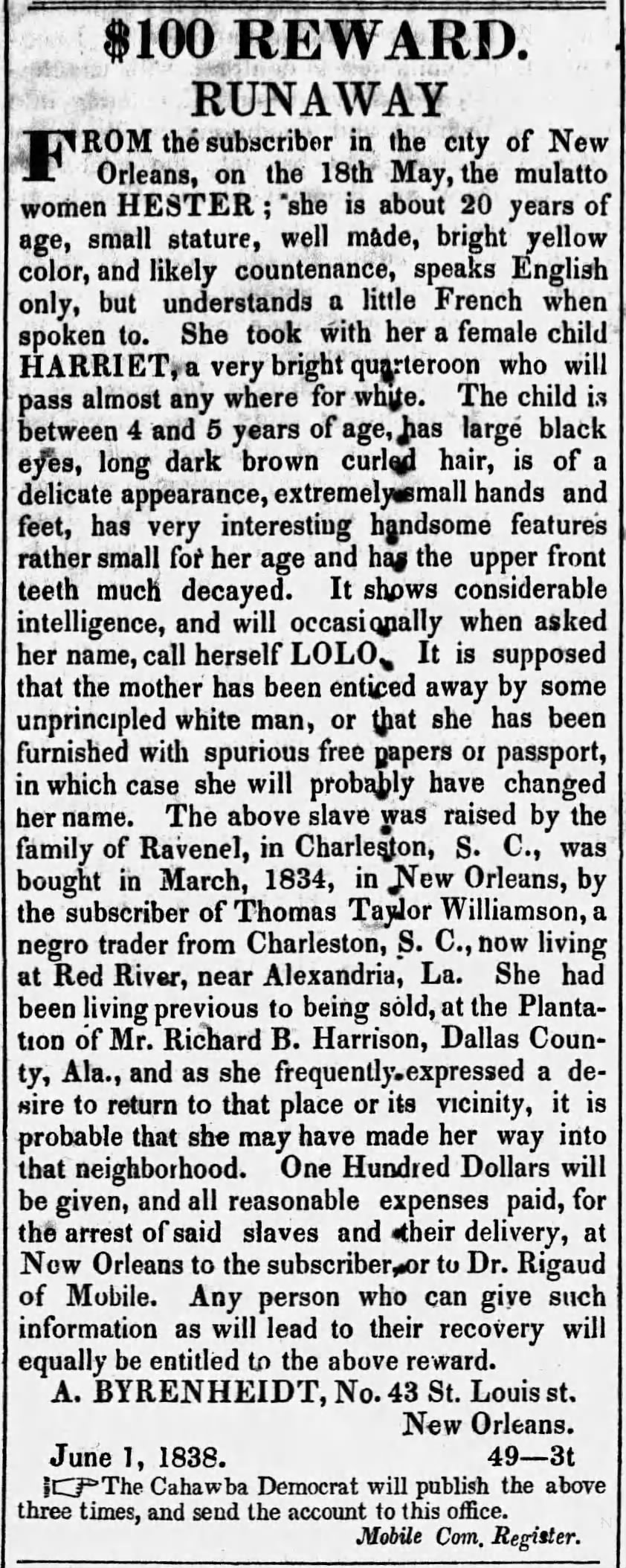
Andreas Byrenheidt, a 70-year-old physician, placed an unusually long and detailed runaway slave ad in two Alabama newspapers in hopes of recovering a 20-year-old enslaved woman, whom he had purchased four years earlier, and her four-year-old daughter, who sometimes called herself Lolo ("$100 Reward" Cahawba Democrat, Cahaba, Alabama, June 16, 1838)

"Fancy" was a code word that indicated that the girl or young woman was suitable or trained for sexual use. Especially light-skinned young girls were sold openly for this purpose; their price was much higher than that of a field hand. Special markets for the fancy girl trade existed in New Orleans and Lexington, Kentucky. Historian Philip Shaw describes an occasion when Abraham Lincoln and Allen Gentry witnessed such sales in New Orleans in 1828:

Gentry vividly remembered a day in New Orleans when he and the nineteen-year-old Lincoln came upon a slave market. Pausing to watch, Gentry recalled looking down at Lincoln's hands and seeing that he "doubled his fists tightly; his knuckles went white". Men wearing black coats and white hats buy field hands, "black and ugly", for $500 to 800. And then the real horror begins: "When the sale of "fancy girls" began, Lincoln, "unable to stand it any longer", muttered to Gentry "Allen that's a disgrace. If I ever get a lick at that thing I'll hit it hard."

In some cases, children were abused in this manner. Adolescent "fancy girls" were sometimes sold as "virgins" and the sale of a 13-year-old "nearly a fancy" is documented. Zephaniah Kingsley, Jr., bought his wife when she was 13. Young boys, sometimes no older than 10 or 12, were similarly sold as "fancy boys" by at least one American slave trader.

Enslaved women who were old enough to bear children were encouraged to procreate, which raised their value as slaves, since their children would eventually provide labor or be sold, enriching the owners. Enslaved women were sometimes medically treated to enable or encourage their fertility. The variations in skin color found in the United States make it obvious how often black women were impregnated by whites. For example, in the 1850 Census, 75.4% of "free negros" in Florida were described as mulattos, of mixed race. Nevertheless, it is only very recently, with DNA studies, that any sort of reliable number can be provided, and the research has only begun. Light-skinned girls, who contrasted with the darker field workers, were preferred.

As it became popular on many plantations to breed slaves for strength, fertility, or extra labor, there grew many documented instances of "breeding farms" in the United States. Slaves were forced to conceive and birth as many new slaves as possible. The largest farms were located in Virginia and Maryland. Because the industry of slave breeding came from a desire for larger than natural population growth of slaves, slaveowners often turned towards systematic practices for creating more slaves. Female slaves "were subjected to repeated rape or forced sex and became pregnant again and again", even by incest. In horrific accounts of former slaves, some stated that hoods or bags were placed over their heads to prevent them from knowing who they were forced to have sex with. Journalist William Spivey wrote, "It could be someone they know, perhaps a niece, aunt, sister, or their own mother. The breeders only wanted a child that could be sold."

As Caroline Randall Williams was quoted in The New York Times: "You Want a Confederate Monument? My Body Is a Confederate Monument." "I have rape-colored skin", she added.

The sexual use of black slaves by either slave owners or by those who could purchase the temporary services of a slave took various forms. A slaveowner, or his teenage son, could go to the slave quarters area of the plantation and do what he wanted, with minimal privacy if any. It was common for a "house" female (housekeeper, maid, cook, laundress, or nanny) to be raped by one or more members of the household. Houses of prostitution throughout the slave states were largely staffed by female slaves providing sexual services, to their owners' profit. There were a small number of free black females engaged in prostitution, or concubinage, especially in New Orleans.

Slave owners who engaged in sexual activity with female slaves "were often the elite of the community. They had little need to worry about public scorn." These relationships "appear to have been tolerated and in some cases even quietly accepted". "Southern women ... do not trouble themselves about it". Isaac Franklin and John Armfield, co-founders of a successful slave trading firm and well-established community members, joked frequently in their letters about the black women and girls they were raping. It never occurred to them that there was anything wrong in what they were doing.

An issue that came up frequently was the threat of sexual intercourse between black males and white females. Just as the black women were perceived as having "a trace of Africa, that supposedly incited passion and sexual wantonness", the men were perceived as savages, unable to control their lust, given an opportunity.

Another approach to the question was offered by Quaker and Florida planter Zephaniah Kingsley, Jr. He advocated, and personally practiced, deliberate racial mixing through marriage, as part of his proposed solution to the slavery issue: racial integration, called "amalgamation" at the time. In an 1829 Treatise, he stated that mixed-race people were healthier and often more beautiful, that interracial sex was hygienic, and slavery made it convenient. Because of these views, tolerated in Spanish Florida, he found it impossible to remain long in Territorial Florida, and moved with his slaves and multiple wives to a plantation, Mayorasgo de Koka, in Haiti (now in the Dominican Republic). There were many others who less flagrantly practiced interracial, common-law marriages with slaves (see Partus sequitur ventrem).

=== Slave markets and slave prisons ===
In New Orleans, most sales were made between September and May. Buyers visited the slave pen and inspected enslaved people prior to the sale. People were held until their means of transportation was arranged. They were transported in groups by boat, walked to their new owners, or a combination of the two. They were moved in groups in a coffle. This meant that people were chained together with iron rings around their necks which were fastened with wooden or iron bars. Men on horseback herded the groups, or coffles, to their destination. They used dogs, guns, and whips. Railroads brought a new, simpler means of travel that did not rely on the use of coffles. In some cases, slave traders, like Franklin & Armfield, had a network of slave depots that were located along their routes. Circa 1833, an Appalachian newspaper complained about the slave traders traveling through the region with coffles, and reported that private jails had been built by slave traders at Baltimore, Washington, Norfolk, and near Fredericksburg. Abolitionist Theodore Dwight Weld wrote around 1840:

The procurement of from fifty to three hundred slaves is a work of days, sometimes of weeks or months. Many plantations must be visited by the trader and his agents. Then a variety of circumstances occasions necessary delays, before the gang can be put in motion for the south. During this period the slaves are secured by handcuffs, fetters, and chains, and put into some place of confinement. The national prison at Washington city, and the state prisons, are prostituted to this use when occasion requires. The more extensive slave-dealers have private prisons constructed expressly for this purpose.

Lumpkin's Jail, the largest in the state of Virginia, was a particularly inhumane place that resulted in people dying of starvation, illness, or beating. They were so cramped that they were sometimes on top of one another. There were no toilet facilities. A 1928 history described jail cells built on the Maryland farm of trader George Kephart: "Mr. Kephart was probably the largest slavedealer in the county. He had two underground jails built where he kept the unruly, as well as a brick jail above ground."

Some jails may have been tidy and officious operations, but many or most were not. Henry Bibb described one jail where he was held as repugnant "on account of the filth and dirt of the most disagreeable kind...there were bedbugs, fleas, lice and mosquitoes in abundance to contend with. At night we had to lie down on the floor in this filth. Our food was very scanty, and of the most inferior quality. No gentleman's dog would eat what we were compelled to eat or starve." St. Louis slave trader Bernard M. Lynch offered jailing services to owners for 37½ cents per slave per day.

A negro mart was usually a type of urban retail market, usually consisting of a dedicated showroom and/or a workyard, a jail, and storerooms or kitchens for food. Negro marts were urban "clearinghouses" that both acquired enslaved people from more rural districts and sold people for use as farm, skilled, or domestic labor. The term negro mart was most commonly used in Charleston, South Carolina, but can also be found in Memphis, Tennessee, and multiple locations in Georgia. In the 1850s, future Confederate military leader Nathan Bedford Forrest operated a heavily advertised negro mart on Adams Street in Memphis. In January 1860, the New York Times reported that the Forrest & Jones negro mart in Memphis had collapsed and caught fire; two people died but the bills of sale for people, "amounting in the aggregate to US$400,000" were salvaged.

=== Slave codes ===
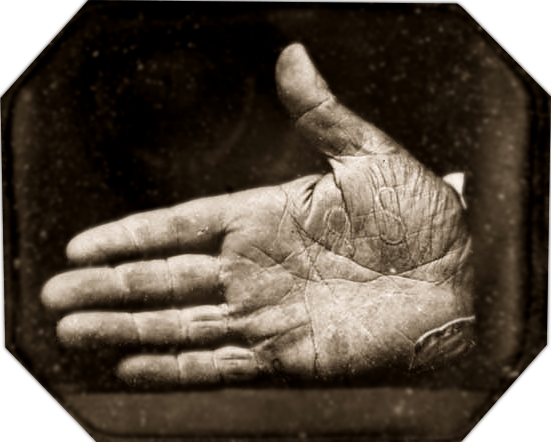
The inscription on the back of the case reads: This Daguerreotype was taken by Southworth Aug. 1845 it is a copy of Captain Jonathan Walker's hand as branded by the U.S. Marshall of the Dist. of Florida for having helped 7 men to obtain 'Life Liberty, and Happiness.' SS Slave Saviour Northern Dist. SS Slave Stealer Southern Dist.

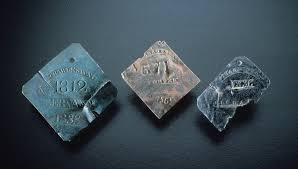
Tags to be used for identifying and tracking enslaved people of Charleston, South Carolina (National Museum of American History 1993.0503)

To help regulate the relationship between slave and owner, including legal support for keeping the slave as property, states established slave codes, most based on laws existing since the colonial era. The code for the District of Columbia defined a slave as "a human being, who is by law deprived of his or her liberty for life, and is the property of another".

While each state had its own slave code, many concepts were shared throughout the slave states. According to the slave codes, some of which were passed in reaction to slave rebellions, teaching a slave to read or write was illegal. This prohibition was unique to American slavery, believed to reduce slaves forming aspirations that could lead to escape or rebellion. Informal education occurred when white children taught slave companions what they were learning; in other cases, adult slaves learned from free artisan workers, especially if located in cities, where there was more freedom of movement.

In Alabama, slaves were not allowed to leave their master's premises without written consent or passes. This was a common requirement in other states as well, and locally run patrols (known to slaves as pater rollers) often checked the passes of slaves who appeared to be away from their plantations. In Alabama slaves were prohibited from trading goods among themselves. In Virginia, a slave was not permitted to drink in public within one mile of his master or during public gatherings. Slaves were not permitted to carry firearms in any of the slave states.

Slaves were generally prohibited by law from associating in groups, with the exception of worship services (a reason why the Black Church is such a notable institution in black communities today). Following Nat Turner's rebellion in 1831, which raised white fears throughout the South, some states also prohibited or restricted religious gatherings of slaves, or required that they be officiated by white men. Planters feared that group meetings would facilitate communication among slaves that could lead to rebellion. Slaves held private, secret "brush meetings" in the woods.

In Ohio, an emancipated slave was prohibited from returning to the state in which he or she had been enslaved. Other Northern states discouraged the settling of free blacks within their boundaries. Fearing the influence of free blacks, Virginia and other Southern states passed laws to require blacks who had been freed to leave the state within a year (or sometimes less time) unless granted a stay by an act of the legislature.

=== Religion ===
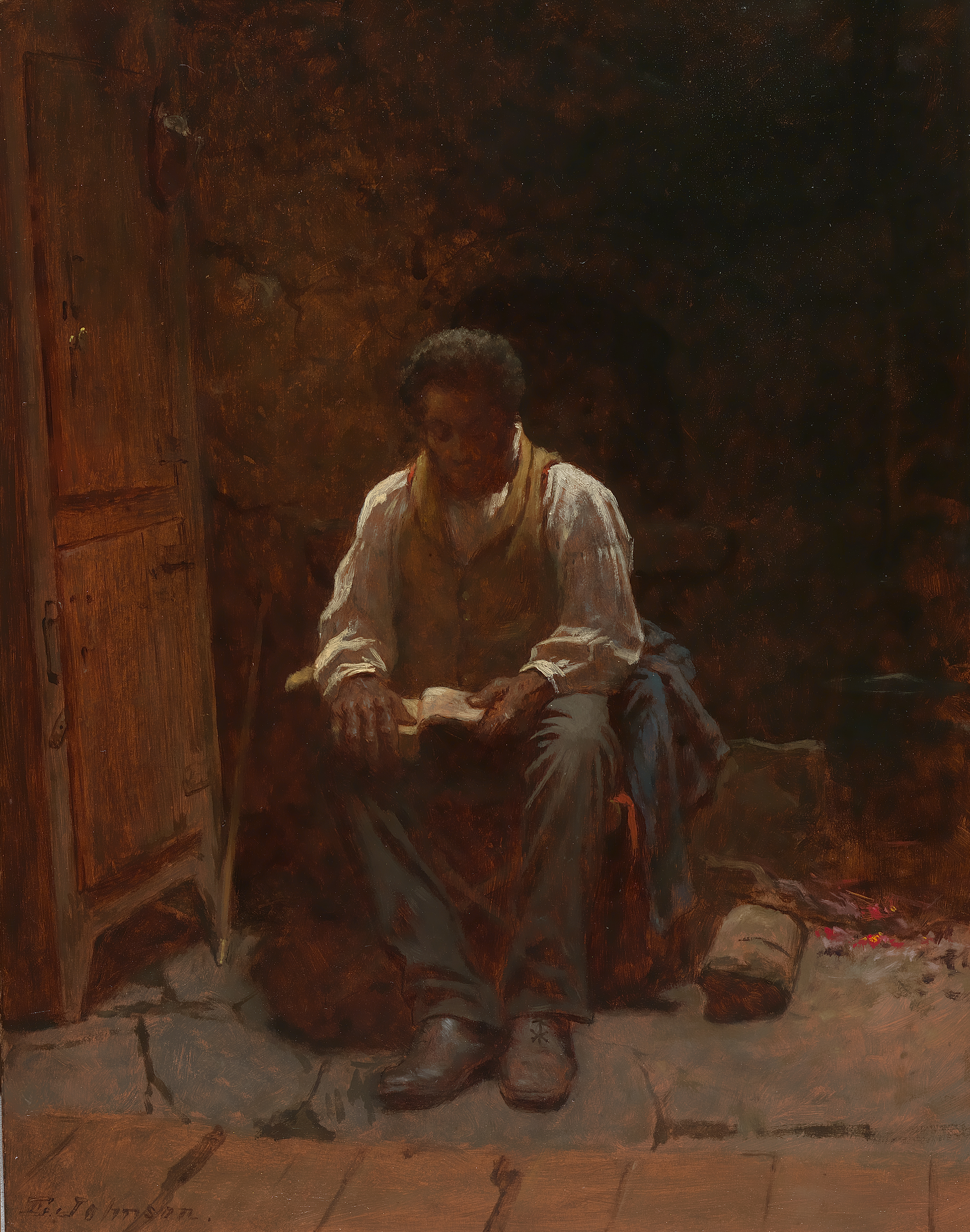
Eastman Johnson's 1863 oil painting painting The Lord is My Shepherd (Smithsonian American Art Museum 1979.5.13)

Africans brought their religions with them from Africa, including Islam, Catholicism, and traditional religions.

Prior to the American Revolution, masters and revivalists spread Christianity to slave communities, including Catholicism in Spanish Florida and California, and in French and Spanish Louisiana, and Protestantism in English colonies, supported by the Society for the Propagation of the Gospel. In the First Great Awakening of the mid-18th century, Baptists and Methodists from New England preached a message against slavery, encouraged masters to free their slaves, converted both slaves and free blacks, and gave them active roles in new congregations. The first independent black congregations were started in the South before the Revolution, in South Carolina and Georgia. Believing that, "slavery was contrary to the ethics of Jesus", Christian congregations and church clergy, especially in the North, played a role in the Underground Railroad, especially Wesleyan Methodists and Quakers.

Over the decades and with the growth of slavery throughout the South, some Baptist and Methodist ministers gradually changed their messages to accommodate the institution. After 1830, white Southerners argued for the compatibility of Christianity and slavery, with a multitude of both Old and New Testament citations. They promoted Christianity as encouraging better treatment of slaves and argued for a paternalistic approach. In the 1840s and 1850s, the issue of accepting slavery split the nation's largest religious denominations (the Methodist, Baptist and Presbyterian churches) into separate Northern and Southern organizations (see Methodist Episcopal Church, South, Southern Baptist Convention, and Presbyterian Church in the Confederate States of America). Schisms occurred, such as that between the Wesleyan Methodist Church and the Methodist Episcopal Church.

Southern slaves generally attended their masters' white churches, where they often outnumbered the white congregants. They were usually permitted to sit only in the back or in the balcony. They listened to white preachers, who emphasized the obligation of slaves to keep in their place, and acknowledged the slave's identity as both person and property. Preachers taught the master's responsibility and the concept of appropriate paternal treatment, using Christianity to improve conditions for slaves, and to treat them "justly and fairly" (Col. 4:1). This included masters having self-control, not disciplining under anger, not threatening, and ultimately fostering Christianity among their slaves by example.

Slaves also created their own religious observances, meeting alone without the supervision of their white masters or ministers. The larger plantations with groups of slaves numbering 20, or more, tended to be centers of nighttime meetings of one or several plantation slave populations. These congregations revolved around a singular preacher, often illiterate with limited knowledge of theology, who was marked by his personal piety and ability to foster a spiritual environment. African Americans developed a theology related to Biblical stories having the most meaning for them, including the hope for deliverance from slavery by their own Exodus. One lasting influence of these secret congregations is the African American spiritual.

=== Mandatory illiteracy ===
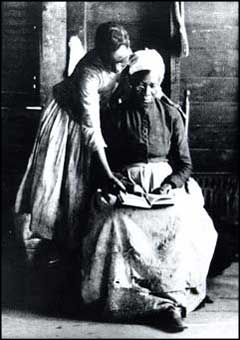
Former slave reading, 1870. After slavery ended, illiteracy rates among black people dropped from 80% in 1870 to 30% in 1910.

In a feature unique to American slavery, legislatures across the South enacted new laws to curtail the already limited rights of black people. For example, Virginia prohibited blacks, free or slave, from practicing preaching, prohibited them from owning firearms, and forbade anyone to teach slaves or free blacks how to read. It specified heavy penalties for both student and teacher if slaves were taught, including whippings or jail.

[E]very assemblage of negroes for the purpose of instruction in reading or writing, or in the night time for any purpose, shall be an unlawful assembly. Any justice may issue his warrant to any office or other person, requiring him to enter any place where such assemblage may be, and seize any negro therein; and he, or any other justice, may order such negro to be punished with stripes.

Slave owners saw literacy as a threat to the institution of slavery and their financial investment in it; as a North Carolina statute passed in 1830-1831 stated, "Teaching slaves to read and write, tends to excite dissatisfaction in their minds, and to produce insurrection and rebellion." Literacy enabled the enslaved to read the writings of abolitionists, which discussed the abolition of slavery and described the slave revolution in Haiti of 1791–1804 and the end of slavery in the British Empire in 1833. It also allowed slaves to learn that thousands of enslaved individuals had escaped, often with the assistance of the Underground Railroad. Literacy also was believed to make the enslaved unhappy at best, insolent and sullen at worst. As put by prominent Washington lawyer Elias B. Caldwell in 1822:

The more you improve the condition of these people, the more you cultivate their minds, the more miserable you make them, in their present state. You give them a higher relish for those privilegies which they can never attain, and turn what we intend for a blessing [slavery] into a curse. No, if they must remain in their present situation, keep them in the lowest state of degradation and ignorance. The nearer you bring them to the condition of brutes, the better chance do you give them of possessing their apathy.

Unlike in the South, slave owners in Utah were required to send their slaves to school. Black slaves did not have to spend as much time in school as Indian slaves.

=== Freedom suits and Dred Scott ===
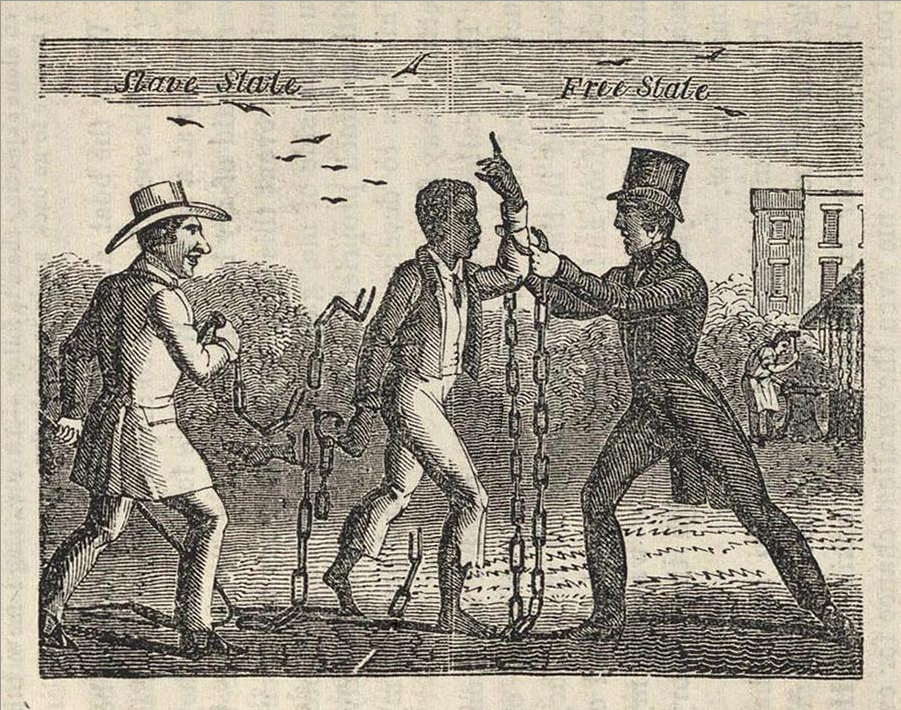
Allegorical liberation of a slave entering a free state, wood-engraving from Narrative of the Life and Adventures of Henry Bibb, An American Slave, 1849

With the development of slave and free states after the American Revolution, and far-flung commercial and military activities, new situations arose in which slaves might be taken by masters into free states. Most free states not only prohibited slavery, but ruled that slaves brought and kept there illegally could be freed. Such cases were sometimes known as transit cases. Dred Scott and his wife Harriet Scott each sued for freedom in St. Louis after the death of their master, based on their having been held in a free territory (the northern part of the Louisiana Purchase from which slavery was excluded under the terms of the Missouri Compromise). (Later the two cases were combined under Dred Scott's name.) Scott filed suit for freedom in 1846 and went through two state trials, the first denying and the second granting freedom to the couple (and, by extension, their two daughters, who had also been held illegally in free territories). For 28 years, Missouri state precedent had generally respected laws of neighboring free states and territories, ruling for freedom in such transit cases where slaves had been held illegally in free territory. But in the Dred Scott case, the Missouri Supreme Court ruled against the slaves.

After Scott and his team appealed the case to the U.S. Supreme Court, Chief Justice Roger B. Taney, in a sweeping decision, denied Scott his freedom. The 1857 decision, decided 7–2, held that a slave did not become free when taken into a free state; Congress could not bar slavery from a territory; and people of African descent imported into the United States and held as slaves, or their descendants, could never be citizens and thus had no status to bring suit in a U.S. court. A state could not bar slaveowners from bringing slaves into that state. Many Republicans, including Abraham Lincoln, considered the decision unjust and evidence that the Slave Power had seized control of the Supreme Court. Anti-slavery groups were enraged and slave owners encouraged, escalating the tensions that led to civil war.

=== 1850 to the firing on Fort Sumter ===
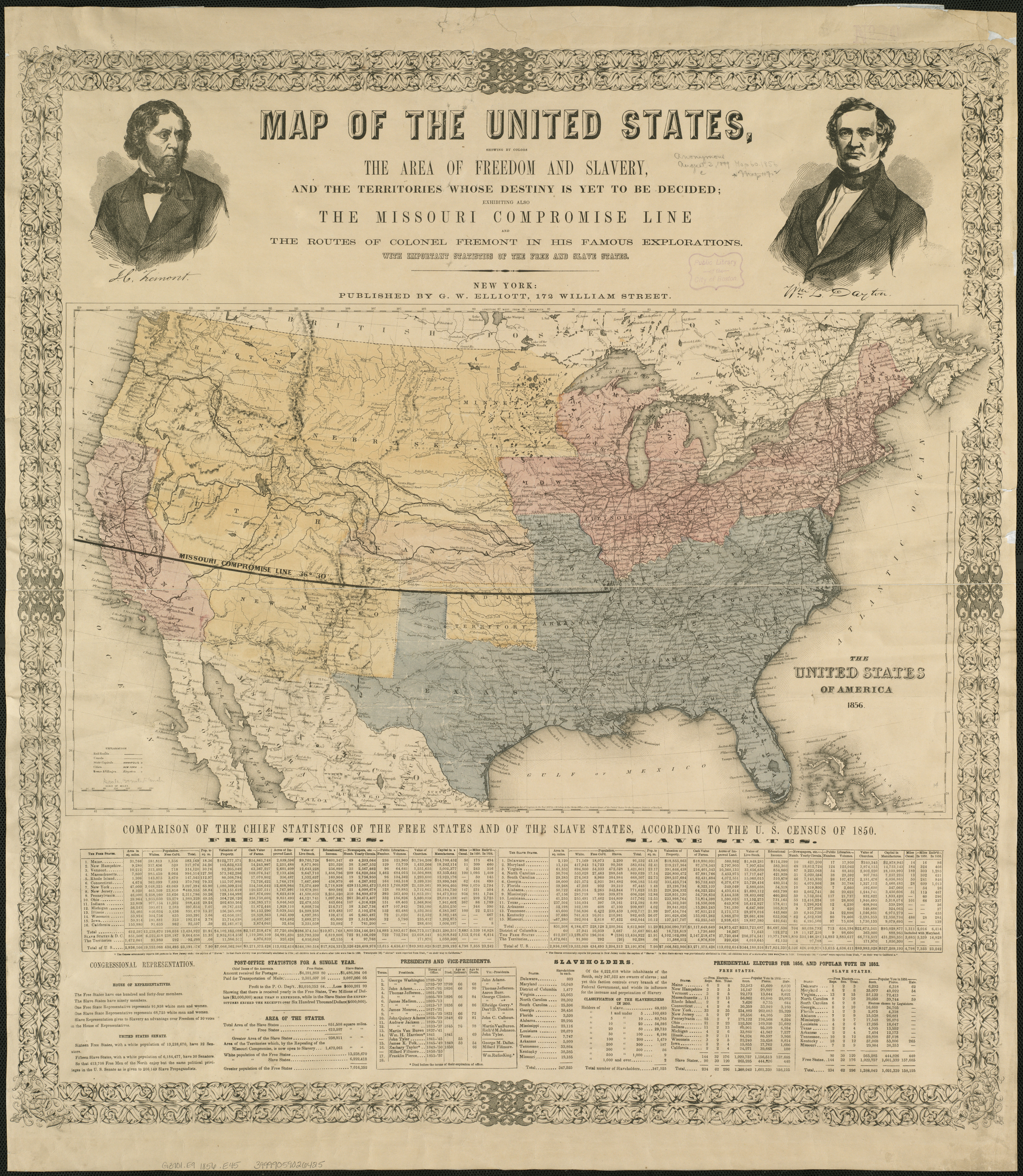
Map of the United States in 1856, showing the areas where slavery was still present, and those where it wasn't

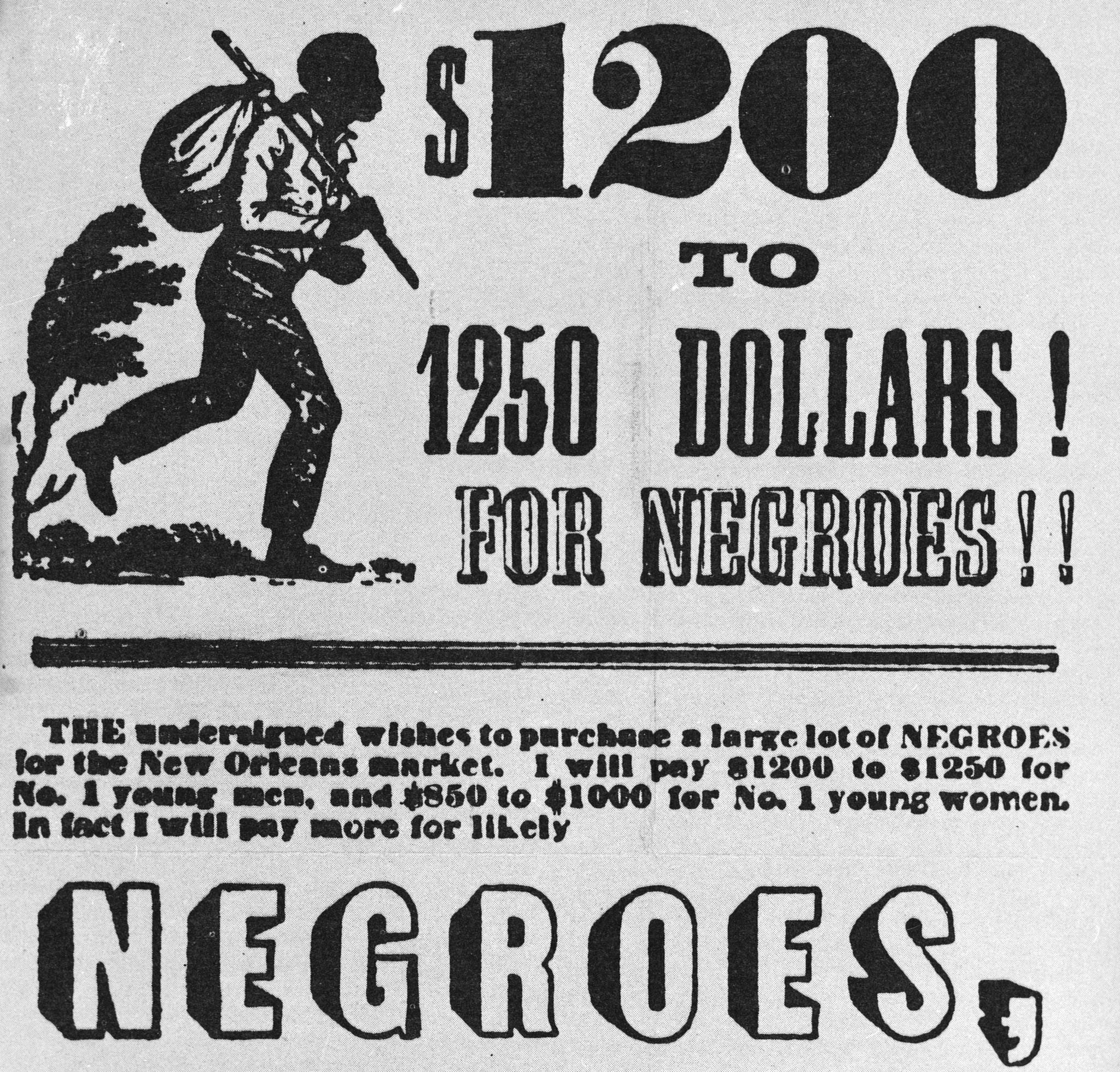
1853 advertisement by a slave trader seeking to buy slaves to resell in the lucrative New Orleans slave market

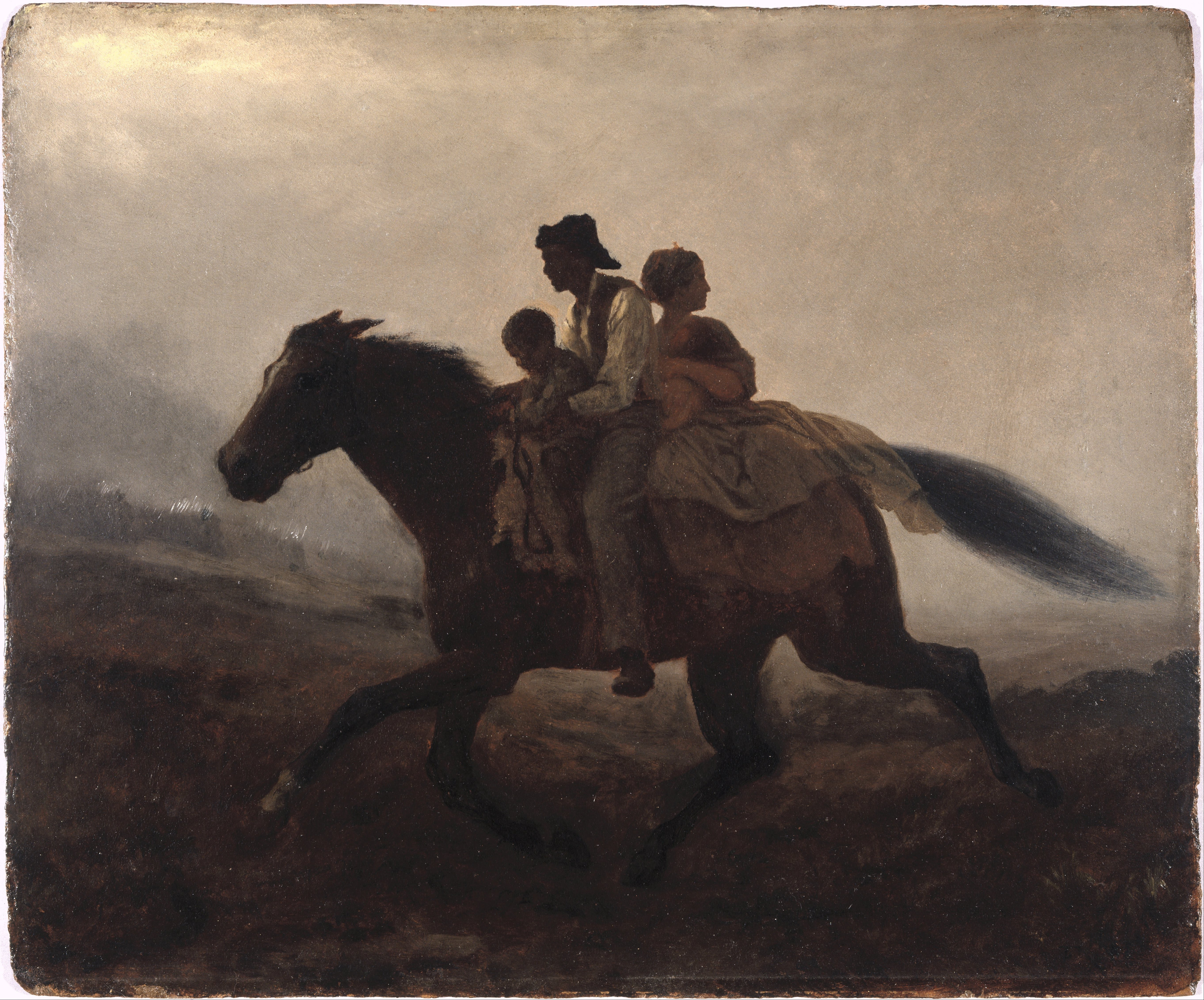
A Ride for Liberty – The Fugitive Slaves, oil on paperboard, c. 1862 by Eastman Johnson (Brooklyn Museum 40.59a-b)

In 1850, Congress passed the Fugitive Slave Act, as part of the Compromise of 1850, which required law enforcement and citizens of free states to cooperate in the capture and return of slaves. This met with considerable overt and covert resistance in free states and cities such as Philadelphia, New York, and Boston. Refugees from slavery continued to flee the South across the Ohio River and other parts of the Mason–Dixon line dividing North from South, to the North and Canada via the Underground Railroad. Some white Northerners helped hide former slaves from their former owners or helped them reach freedom in Canada.

As part of the Compromise of 1850, Congress abolished the slave trade (though not the ownership of slaves) in the District of Columbia; fearing this would happen, Alexandria, regional slave trading center and port, successfully sought its removal from the District of Columbia and devolution to Virginia. After 1854, Republicans argued that the "Slave Power", especially the pro-slavery Democratic Party in the South, controlled two of the three branches of the Federal government.

The abolitionists, realizing that the total elimination of slavery was unrealistic as an immediate goal, worked to prevent the expansion of slavery into the western territories that eventually would become new states. The Missouri Compromise, the Compromise of 1850, and the Bleeding Kansas period dealt with whether new states would be slave or free, or how that was to be decided. Both sides were anxious about effects of these decisions on the balance of power in the Senate.

After the passage of the Kansas–Nebraska Act in 1854, border fighting broke out in the Kansas Territory, where the question of whether it would be admitted to the Union as a slave or free state was left to the inhabitants. Migrants from both free and slave states moved into the territory to prepare for the vote on slavery. Abolitionist John Brown, the most famous of the anti-slavery immigrants, was active in the fighting in "Bleeding Kansas", but so too were many white Southerners (many from adjacent Missouri) who opposed abolition.

Abraham Lincoln's and the Republicans' political platform in 1860 was to stop slavery's expansion. Historian James M. McPherson says that in his famous "House Divided" speech in 1858, Lincoln said American republicanism can be purified by restricting the further expansion of slavery as the first step to putting it on the road to 'ultimate extinction.' Southerners took Lincoln at his word. When he won the presidency, they left the Union to escape the 'ultimate extinction' of slavery."

The divisions became fully exposed with the 1860 presidential election. The electorate split four ways. The Southern Democrats endorsed slavery, while the Republican Party denounced it. The Northern Democrats said democracy required the people to decide on slavery locally, state by state and territory by territory. The Constitutional Union Party said the survival of the Union was at stake and everything else should be compromised.

Lincoln, the Republican, won with a plurality of popular votes and a majority of electoral votes. Lincoln, however, did not appear on the ballots of ten southern slave states. Many slave owners in the South feared that the real intent of the Republicans was the abolition of slavery in states where it already existed, and that the sudden emancipation of four million slaves would be disastrous for the slave owners and for the economy that drew its greatest profits from the labor of people who were not paid. The slave owners feared that ending the balance could lead to the domination of the federal government by the northern free states. This led seven southern states to secede from the Union. When the Confederate Army attacked a U.S. Army installation at Fort Sumter, the American Civil War began and four additional slave states seceded. Northern leaders had viewed the slavery interests as a threat politically, but with secession, they viewed the prospect of a new Southern nation, the Confederate States of America, with control over the Mississippi River and parts of the West, as politically unacceptable. Most of all, they could not accept this repudiation of American nationalism.

== Civil War and emancipation ==
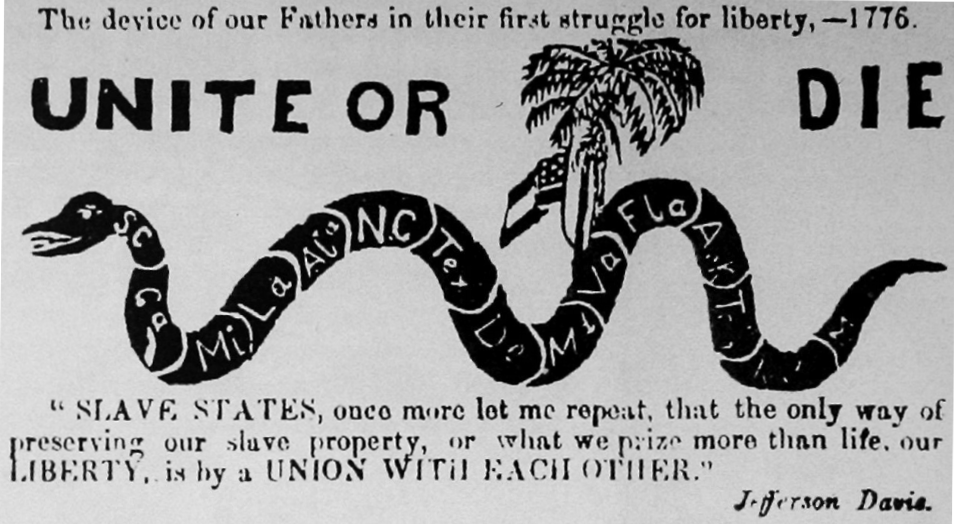
Modification by G. W. Falen of Ben Franklin's Join, or Die graphic, advocating a confederation of slave states, with a quote from Jefferson Davis: "SLAVE STATES, once more let me repeat that the only way of preserving our slave property, or what we prize more than life, our LIBERTY, is by a UNION WITH EACH OTHER." (New-York Historical Society)

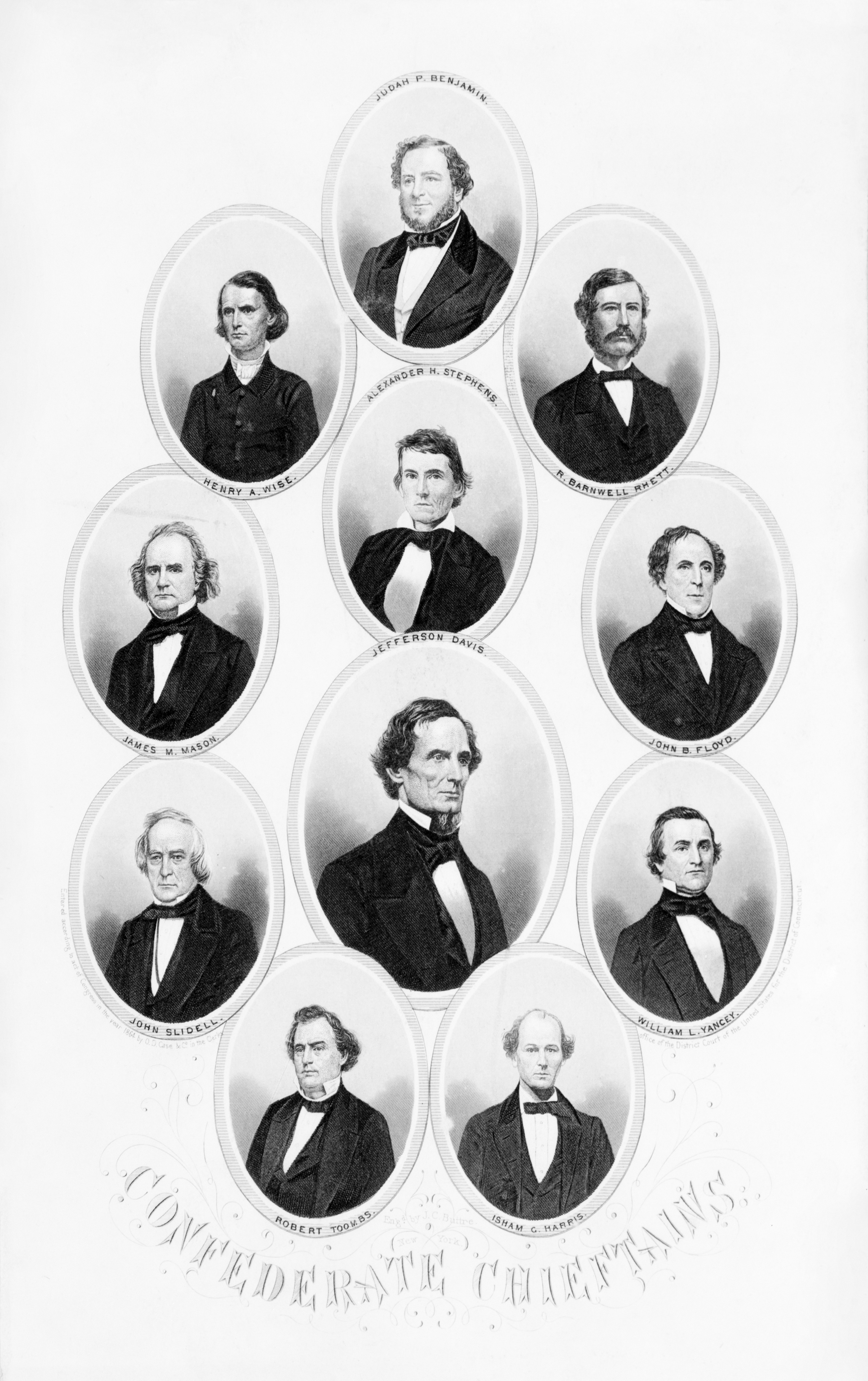
Pro-slavery activists Judah P. Benjamin, Henry A. Wise, R. Barnwell Rhett Jr., Alexander H. Stephens, James M. Mason, Jefferson Davis, John B. Floyd, John Slidell, William L. Yancey, Robert Toombs, and Isham G. Harris ("Confederate chieftains" engraving by J.C. Buttre, 1864)

=== American Civil War ===
The American Civil War, beginning in 1861, led to the end of chattel slavery in America. Not long after the war broke out, through a legal maneuver by Union General Benjamin F. Butler, a lawyer by profession, slaves who fled to Union lines were considered "contraband of war". General Butler ruled that they were not subject to return to Confederate owners as they had been before the war. "Lincoln and his Cabinet discussed the issue on May 30 and decided to support Butler's stance". Soon word spread, and many slaves sought refuge in Union territory, desiring to be declared "contraband". Many of the "contrabands" joined the Union Army as workers or troops, forming entire regiments of the U.S. Colored Troops. Others went to refugee camps such as the Grand Contraband Camp near Fort Monroe or fled to northern cities. General Butler's interpretation was reinforced when Congress passed the Confiscation Act of 1861, which declared that any property used by the Confederate military, including slaves, could be confiscated by Union forces.

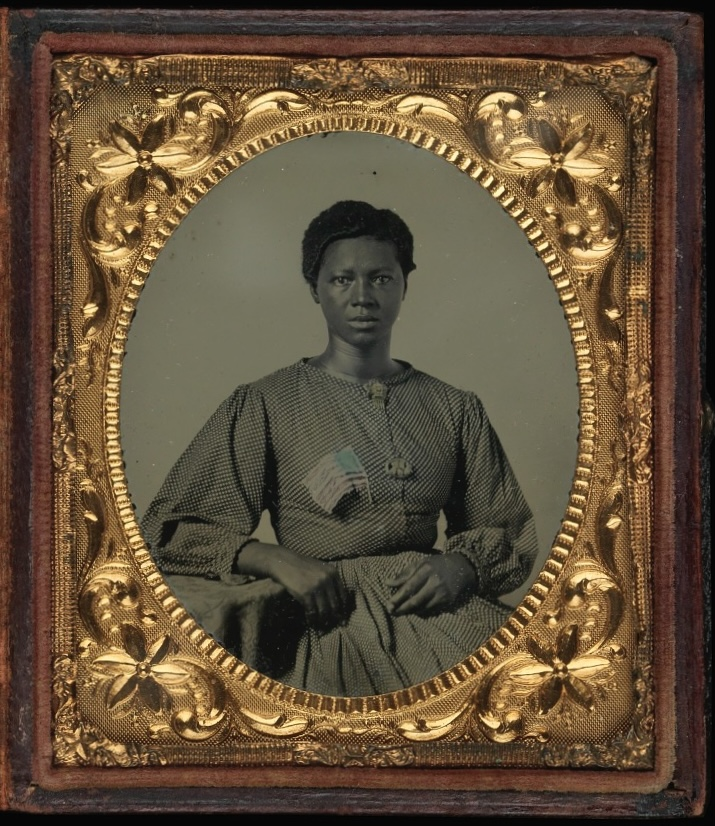
Ambrotype of African-American woman with a flag, "believed to be a washerwoman for Union troops quartered outside Richmond, Virginia" (National Museum of American History 2005.0002)

At the beginning of the war, some Union commanders thought they were supposed to return escaped slaves to their masters. By 1862, when it became clear that this would be a long war, the question of what to do about slavery became more general. The Southern economy and military effort depended on slave labor. It began to seem unreasonable to protect slavery while blockading Southern commerce and destroying Southern production. As Congressman George W. Julian of Indiana put it in an 1862 speech in Congress, the slaves "cannot be neutral. As laborers, if not as soldiers, they will be allies of the rebels, or of the Union." Julian and his fellow Radical Republicans put pressure on Lincoln to rapidly emancipate the slaves, whereas moderate Republicans favored gradual, compensated emancipation and voluntary colonization. The border states, Peace Democrats (Copperheads), and War Democrats opposed emancipation, although the border states and War Democrats eventually accepted it as part of the total war needed to save the Union.

=== Emancipation Proclamation ===
The Emancipation Proclamation was an executive order issued by President Abraham Lincoln on January 1, 1863. In a single stroke it changed the legal status of three million slaves in designated areas of the Confederacy from "slave" to "free". It had the practical effect that as soon as a slave escaped the control of his or her owner, by running away or through advances of federal troops, the slave's proclaimed freedom became actual. Plantation owners, realizing that emancipation would destroy their economic system, sometimes moved their slaves as far as possible out of reach of the Union army. By June 1865, the Union Army controlled all of the Confederacy and had liberated all of the designated slaves.

In 1861, Lincoln expressed the fear that premature attempts at emancipation would mean the loss of the border states. He believed that "to lose Kentucky is nearly the same as to lose the whole game." At first, Lincoln reversed attempts at emancipation by Secretary of War Simon Cameron and Generals John C. Frémont (in Missouri) and David Hunter (in South Carolina, Georgia and Florida) to keep the loyalty of the border states and the War Democrats.

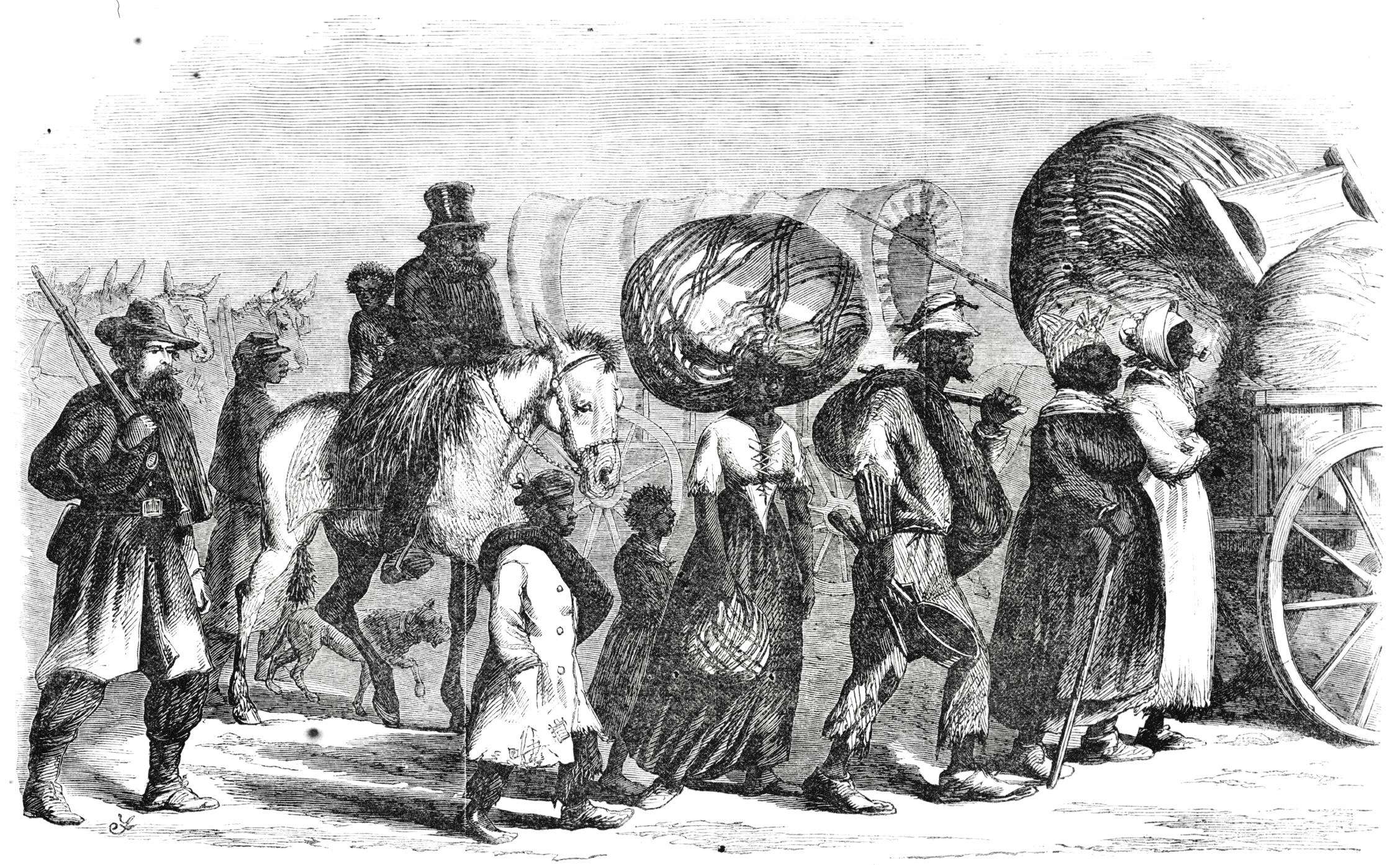
Contrabands accompanying the line of Sherman's march through Georgia (unidentified war artist "F", Frank Leslie's Illustrated News, March 18, 1865)

On July 22, 1862, Lincoln told his cabinet of his plan to issue a preliminary Emancipation Proclamation. Secretary of State William H. Seward advised Lincoln to wait for a victory before issuing the proclamation, as to do otherwise would seem like "our last shriek on the retreat". On September 17, 1862, the Battle of Antietam provided this opportunity, and on September 22, 1862, Lincoln issued his preliminary Emancipation Proclamation, which provided that enslaved people in the states in rebellion against the United States on January 1, 1863, "shall be then, thenceforward, and forever free". On September 24 and 25, the War Governors' Conference added support for the proclamation. Lincoln issued his final Emancipation Proclamation on January 1, 1863. In a letter to Albert G. Hodges, Lincoln explained his belief that

If slavery is not wrong, nothing is wrong ... And yet I have never understood that the Presidency conferred upon me an unrestricted right to act officially upon this judgment and feeling ... I claim not to have controlled events, but confess plainly that events have controlled me.

Lincoln's Emancipation Proclamation declared freedom for slaves in the Confederate states and authorized the enlistment of African Americans in the Union Army. The Emancipation Proclamation did not free slaves in the border states, which were the slaveholding states that remained in the Union. As a practical matter, the proclamation freed only those slaves who escaped to Union lines. But the proclamation made the abolition of slavery an official war goal and was implemented as the Union took territory from the Confederacy. According to the Census of 1860, this policy would free nearly four million slaves, or over 12% of the total U.S. population.

Because the Emancipation Proclamation was issued under the president's war powers, it might not have continued in force after the war ended. Therefore, Lincoln played a leading role in getting the constitutionally required two-thirds majority of both houses of Congress to vote for the Thirteenth Amendment, which, after ratification by the legislatures of three-fourths of the states, made emancipation universal and permanent, "except as a punishment for crime".

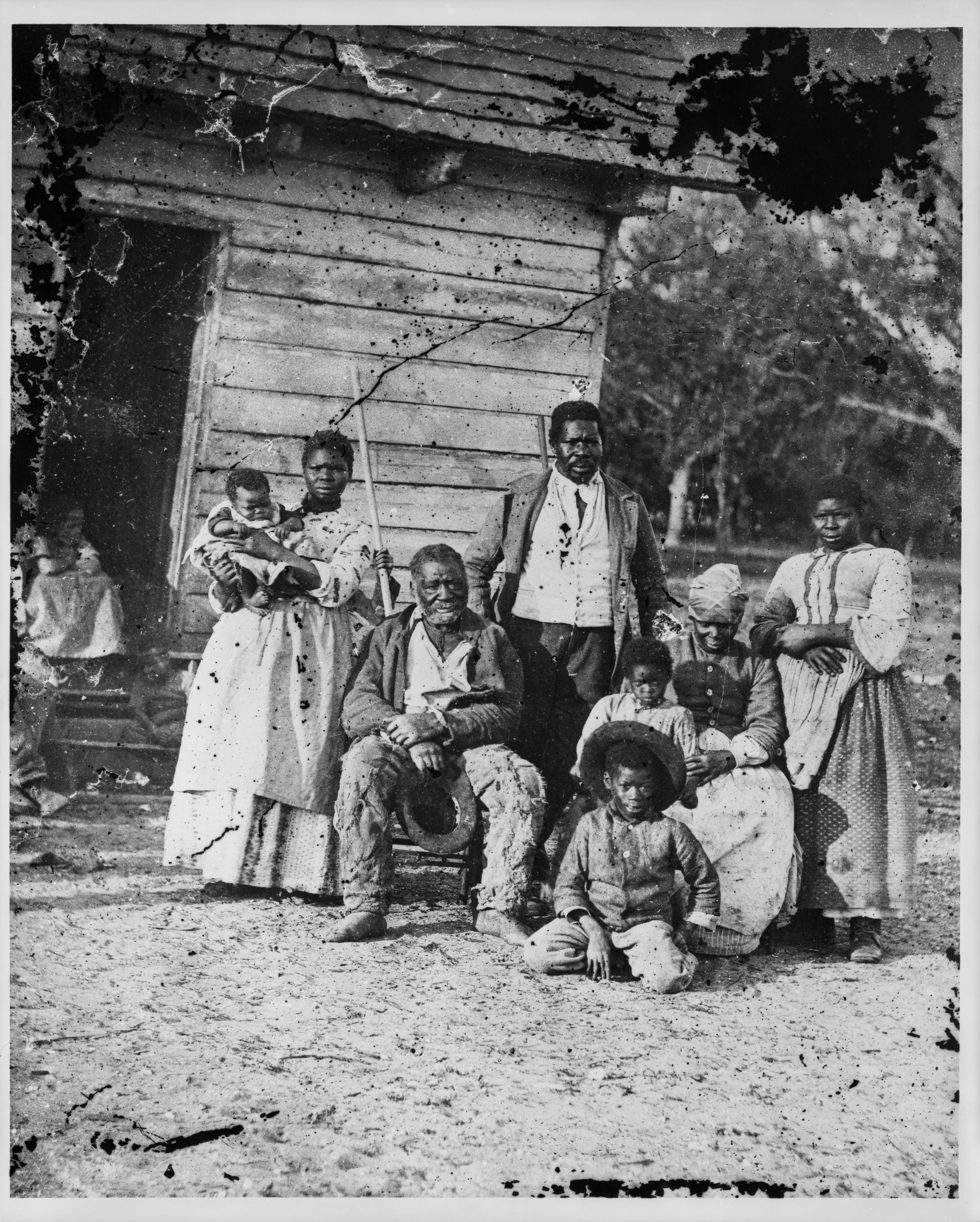
Four generations of a formerly enslaved family, photographed by Timothy H. O'Sullivan on J. J. Smith's confiscated plantation at Beaufort, South Carolina (now U.S. Naval Hospital Beaufort) during the Port Royal Experiment, 1862

Enslaved African Americans had not waited for Lincoln before escaping and seeking freedom behind Union lines. From the early years of the war, hundreds of thousands of African Americans escaped to Union lines, especially in Union-controlled areas such as Norfolk and the Hampton Roads region in 1862 Virginia, Tennessee from 1862 on, and the line of Sherman's march to the sea. So many African Americans fled to Union lines that commanders created camps and schools for them, where both adults and children learned to read and write. The American Missionary Association entered the war effort by sending teachers south to such contraband camps, for instance, establishing schools in Norfolk and on nearby plantations.

In addition, nearly 200,000 African American men served with distinction in the Union forces as soldiers and sailors; most were escaped slaves. The Confederacy was outraged by armed black soldiers and refused to treat those they captured as prisoners of war. They murdered many, as at the Fort Pillow massacre, and re-enslaved others.

On February 24, 1863, the Arizona Organic Act abolished slavery in the newly formed Arizona Territory. Tennessee and all of the border states (except Kentucky and Delaware) abolished slavery by early 1865. Thousands of slaves were freed by the operation of the Emancipation Proclamation as Union armies marched across the South. Emancipation came to the remaining Southern slaves after the surrender of all the Confederate troops in spring 1865.

In spite of the South's shortage of manpower, until 1865, most Southern leaders opposed arming slaves as soldiers. However, a few Confederates discussed arming slaves. Finally, in early 1865, General Robert E. Lee said that black soldiers were essential, and legislation was passed. The first black units were in training when the war ended in April.

=== End of slavery ===
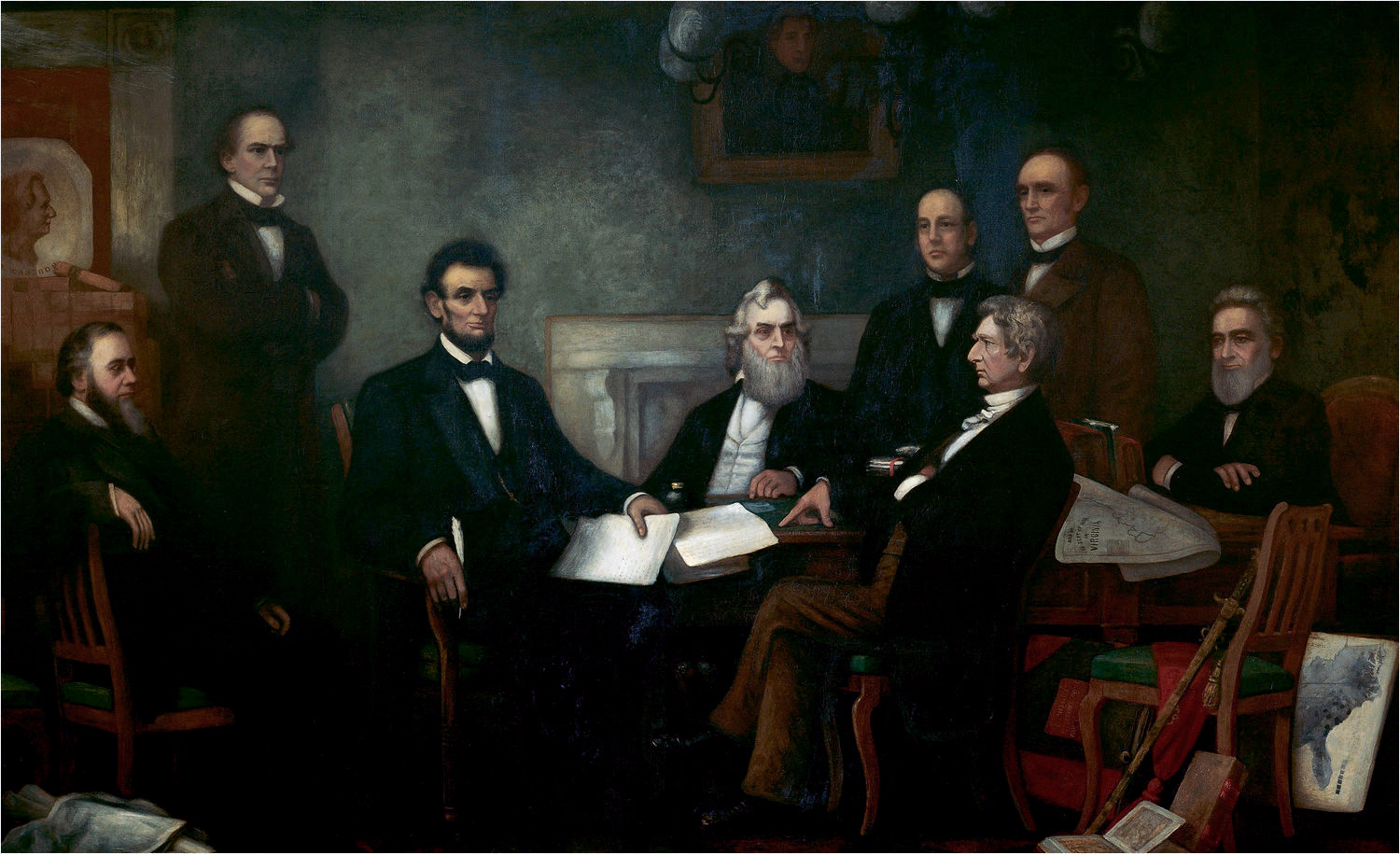
First Reading of the Emancipation Proclamation of President Lincoln (1864) oil painting by Francis Bicknell Carpenter (U.S. Senate Collection 33.00005.000)

Booker T. Washington remembered Emancipation Day in early 1863, when he was a boy of nine in Virginia:

As the great day drew nearer, there was more singing in the slave quarters than usual. It was bolder, had more ring, and lasted later into the night. Most of the verses of the plantation songs had some reference to freedom. ... Some man who seemed to be a stranger (a United States officer, I presume) made a little speech and then read a rather long paper – the Emancipation Proclamation, I think. After the reading we were told that we were all free, and could go when and where we pleased. My mother, who was standing by my side, leaned over and kissed her children, while tears of joy ran down her cheeks. She explained to us what it all meant, that this was the day for which she had been so long praying, but fearing that she would never live to see.

Abolition of slavery in the various states of the United States over time: Abolition of slavery during or shortly after the American Revolution The Northwest Ordinance, 1787 Gradual emancipation in New York (starting 1799) and New Jersey (starting 1804) The Missouri Compromise, 1821 Effective abolition of slavery by Mexican or joint US/British authority Abolition of slavery by Congressional action, 1861 Abolition of slavery by Congressional action, 1862 Emancipation Proclamation as originally issued, 1 Jan 1863 Subsequent operation of the Emancipation Proclamation in 1863 Abolition of slavery by state action during the Civil War Operation of the Emancipation Proclamation in 1864 Operation of the Emancipation Proclamation in 1865 Thirteenth Amendment to the U.S. constitution, 18 Dec 1865 Territory incorporated into the U.S. after the passage of the Thirteenth Amendment

The war ended on June 22, 1865, and following that surrender, the Emancipation Proclamation was enforced throughout remaining regions of the South that had not yet freed the slaves. Slavery officially continued for a couple of months in other locations. Federal troops arrived in Galveston, Texas, on June 19, 1865, to enforce the emancipation. The commemoration of that event, Juneteenth National Independence Day, was declared a national holiday in 2021.

The Thirteenth Amendment, abolishing slavery except as punishment for a crime, had been passed by the Senate in April 1864, and by the House of Representatives in January 1865.

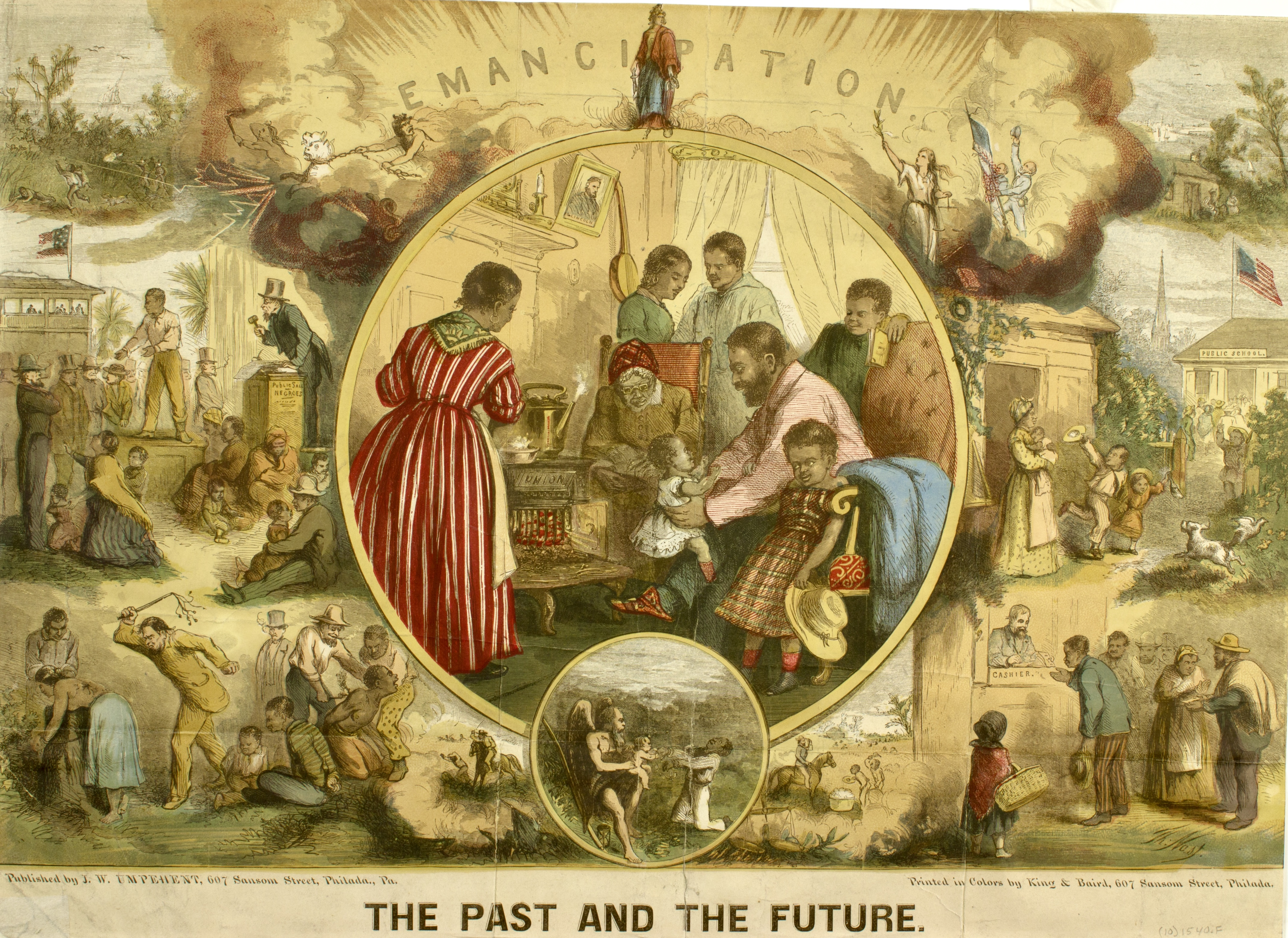
Color lithograph of Thomas Nast's 1863 woodblock etching Emancipation: The Past and the Future (Library Company of Philadelphia 1865-3 variant 101540.F)

The amendment did not take effect until it was ratified by three-fourths of the states, which occurred on December 6, 1865, when Georgia ratified it. On that date, the last 40,000–45,000 enslaved Americans in the remaining two slave states of Kentucky and Delaware, as well as the 200 or so perpetual apprentices in New Jersey left from the very gradual emancipation process begun in 1804, were freed. The last Americans known to have been born into legal slavery died in the 1970s.

== Reconstruction to the present ==
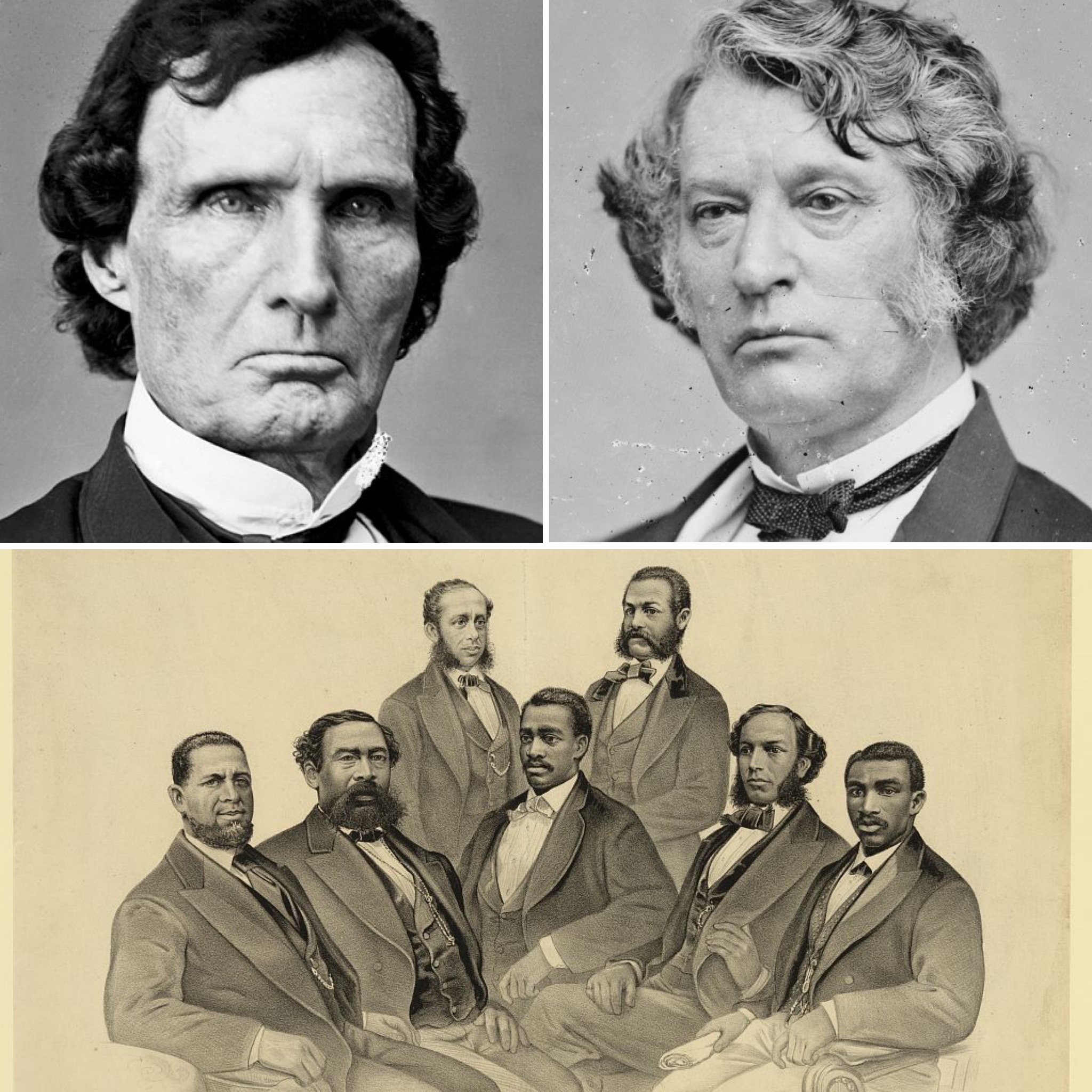
Against (often physically) brutal opposition from the whites of the late rebel states, Radical Republicans like Thaddeus Stevens and Charles Sumner, and black representatives elected by newly enfranchised former slaves, including Hiram Revels, who took Jefferson Davis's old Senate seat, worked to realize the lofty goals of the abolitionists through Congressional legislation

In his Pulitzer Prize-winning book Slavery By Another Name, journalist Douglas A. Blackmon reports that many black persons were virtually enslaved under convict leasing programs, which started after the Civil War. Most Southern states had no prisons; they leased convicts to businesses and farms for their labor, and the lessee paid for food and board. Incentives for abuse were present.

The continued involuntary servitude took various forms, but the primary forms included convict leasing, peonage and sharecropping, with the latter eventually encompassing poor whites as well. By the 1930s, whites constituted most of the South's sharecroppers. Mechanized agriculture reduced the need for farm labor, and many black people left the South in the Great Migration.

Jurisdictions and states created fines and sentences for a wide variety of minor crimes and used these as an excuse to arrest and sentence black people. Under convict-leasing programs, African-American men, often guilty of petty crimes or even no crime at all, were arrested, compelled to work without pay, repeatedly bought and sold, and coerced to do the bidding of the leaseholder.

Sharecropping, as it was practiced during this period, often involved severe restrictions on the free movement of sharecroppers, who could be whipped for leaving the plantation. Both sharecropping and convict leasing were legal and tolerated by both the North and South. Peonage was an illicit form of forced labor. Authorities ignored its existence while thousands of African Americans and poor white Americans were subjugated and held in bondage until the mid-1960s to the late 1970s.

Except in cases of peonage, the federal government took almost no action after the Reconstruction era to enforce the Thirteenth Amendment until December 1941. Five days after the attack on Pearl Harbor, at President Franklin D. Roosevelt's request, Attorney General Francis Biddle issued Circular No. 3591 to all federal prosecutors, instructing them to actively investigate and try any case of involuntary servitude or slavery.

Several months later, convict leasing was officially abolished. But aspects have persisted in other forms. Historians argue that other systems of penal labor were all created in 1865, and convict leasing was simply the most oppressive form. Over time, a large civil rights movement arose to bring full civil rights and equality under the law to all Americans.

=== Convict leasing ===
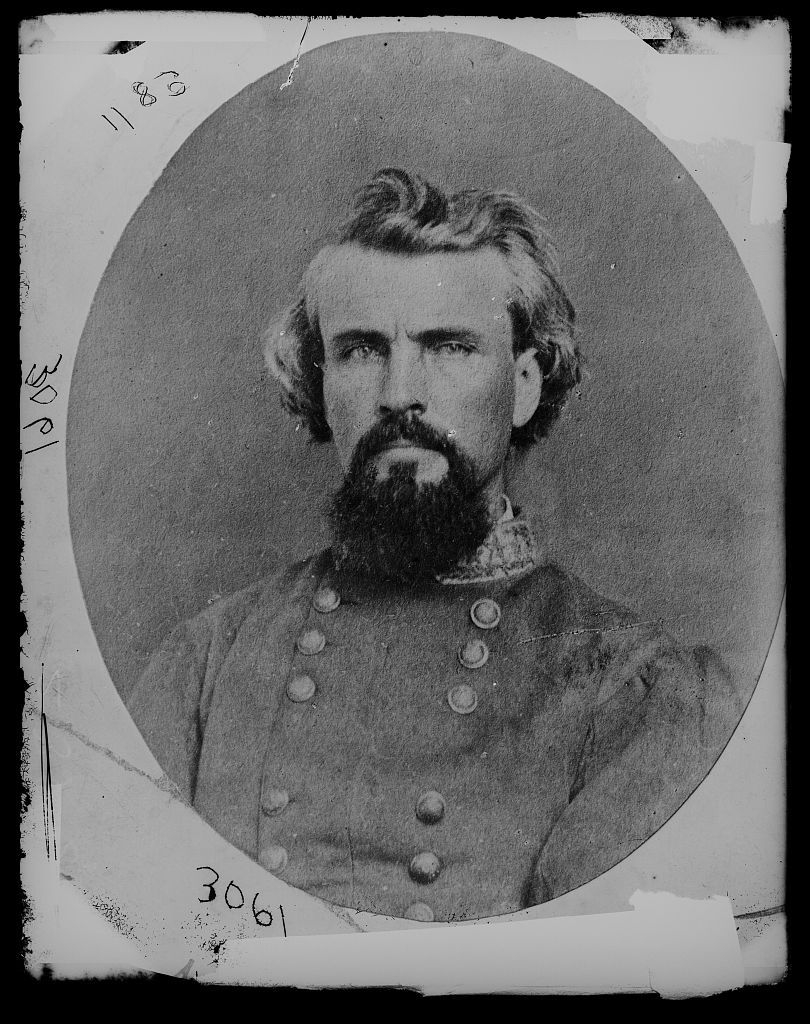
Nathan Bedford Forrest transitioned from being a slave trader before the war to using convict labor on his farm on President's Island near Memphis after the war (glass copy negative, Library of Congress LC-BH821-3061)

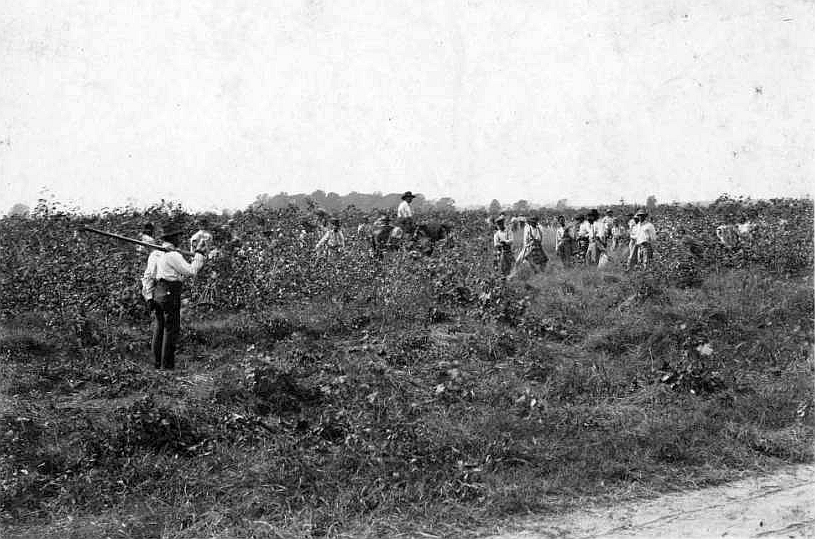
Prisoners pick cotton c. 1900 at Angola Prison Farm in Louisiana, which was built on land that had formerly been plantations owned by hugely successful interstate slave trader Isaac Franklin

With emancipation a legal reality, white Southerners were concerned with both controlling the newly freed slaves and keeping them in the labor force at the lowest level. The system of convict leasing began during Reconstruction and was fully implemented in the 1880s, officially ending in the last state, Alabama, in 1928. It persisted in various forms until President Roosevelt abolished it in 1942, several months after the attack on Pearl Harbor involved the U.S. in World War II.

This system allowed private contractors to purchase the services of convicts from the state or local governments for a specific period. Due to "vigorous and selective enforcement of laws and discriminatory sentencing", African Americans made up the vast majority of the convicts leased. Blackmon writes:

It was a form of bondage distinctly different from that of the antebellum South in that for most men, and the relatively few women drawn in, this slavery did not last a lifetime and did not automatically extend from one generation to the next. But it was nonetheless slavery—a system in which armies of free men, guilty of no crimes and entitled by law to freedom, were compelled to labor without compensation, were repeatedly bought and sold, and were forced to do the bidding of white masters through the regular application of extraordinary physical coercion.

The constitutional basis for convict leasing is that the Thirteenth Amendment, while abolishing slavery and involuntary servitude generally, expressly permits it as punishment for crime.

=== Educational issues ===
Historian Mark Summers Wahlgren notes that the estimated literacy rate among formerly enslaved southern blacks at the time of emancipation was 5% to 10%, but had reached 40% to 50% (and higher in cities) by the turn of the century, a "great advance".

As W. E. B. Du Bois noted, black colleges were not perfect, but "in a single generation they put thirty thousand black teachers in the South" and "wiped out the illiteracy of the majority of black people in the land".

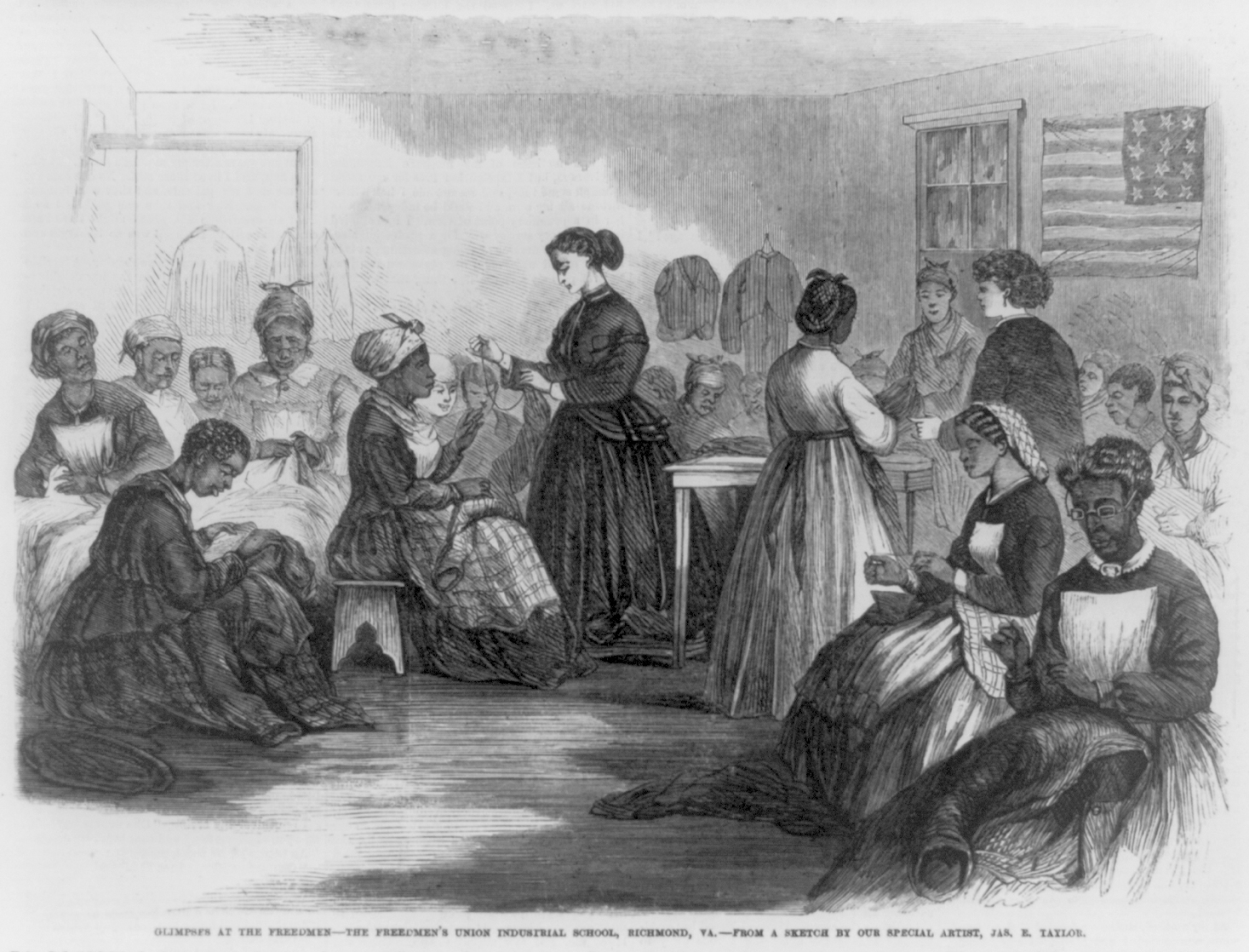
An industrial school set up for ex-slaves in Richmond during Reconstruction (Frank Leslie's illustrated newspaper, September 22, 1866)

Northern philanthropists continued to support black education in the 20th century. A major donor to Hampton Institute and Tuskegee was George Eastman, who also helped fund health programs at colleges and in communities.

=== Apologies ===
In the 21st century, various legislative bodies have issued public apologies for slavery in the United States.

=== Political legacy ===
A 2016 study published in The Journal of Politics found that "[w]hites who currently live in Southern counties that had high shares of slaves in 1860 are more likely to identify as a Republican, oppose affirmative action, and express racial resentment and colder feelings toward blacks." The study contends that "contemporary differences in political attitudes across counties in the American South in part trace their origins to slavery's prevalence more than 150 years ago. "

The authors argue that their findings are consistent with the theory that "following the Civil War, Southern whites faced political and economic incentives to reinforce existing racist norms and institutions to maintain control over the newly freed African American population. This amplified local differences in racially conservative political attitudes, which in turn have been passed down locally across generations."

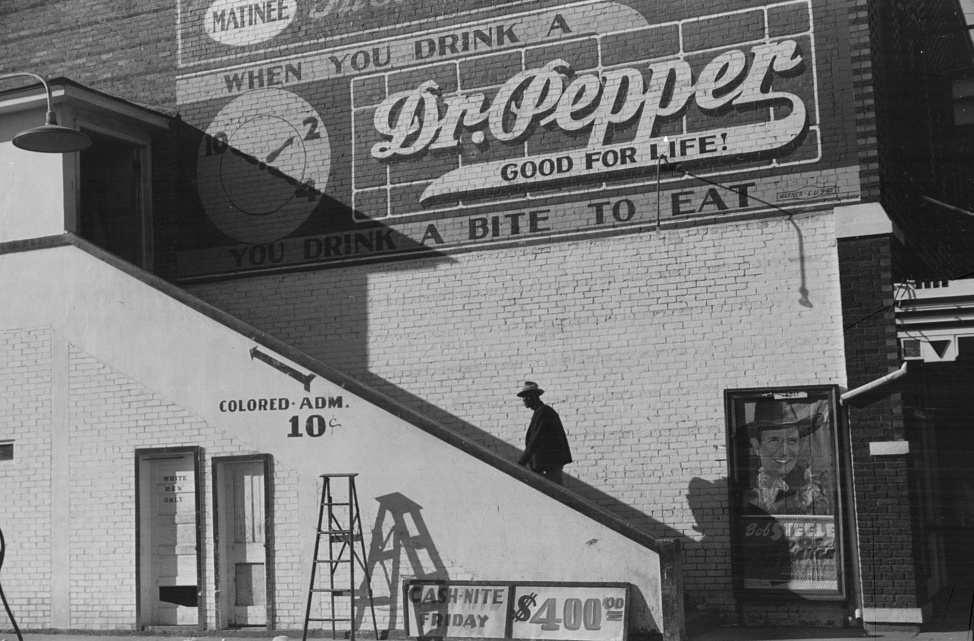
Original caption: "Negro going in colored entrance of movie house on Saturday afternoon, Belzoni, Mississippi Delta, Mississippi" (Marion Post Wolcott 35mm nitrate negative, Farm Security Administration, October 1939)

A 2017 study in the British Journal of Political Science argued that the British American colonies without slavery adopted better democratic institutions to attract migrant workers to their colonies.

An 2022 article in the Journal of Economic History reports that former slave owners remained politically dominant long after slavery was abolished. Using data from Texas, the authors write, "In 1900, still around 50 percent of all state legislators came from a slave-owning background."

== Economics ==
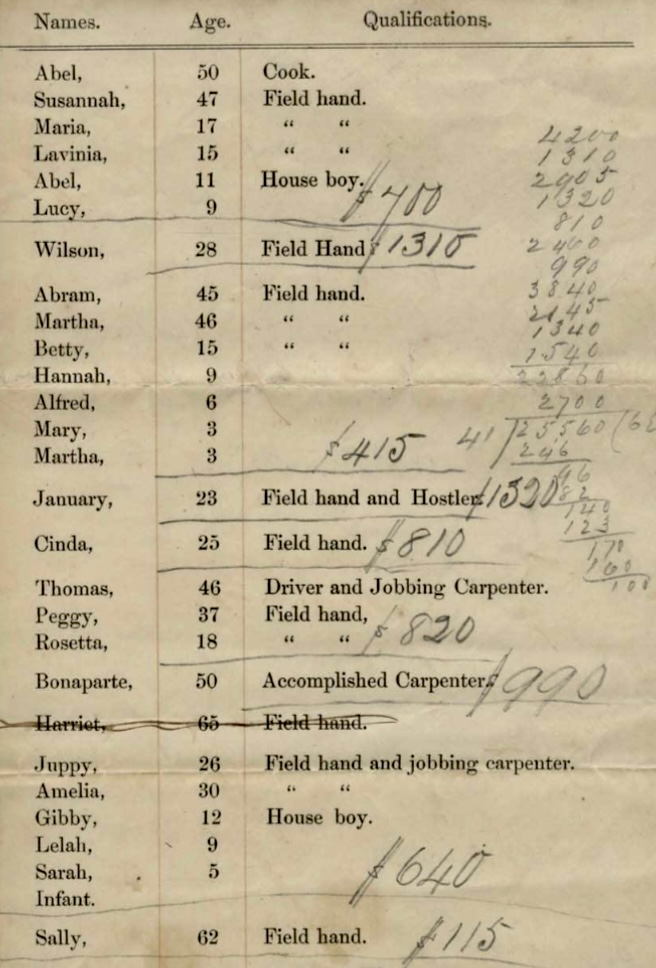
Prices noted in pencil on slave sale broadside with listing of names, ages and special skills; a note was made on an outer page "average $623.45"(Hutson Lee papers, South Carolina Historical Society via Lowcountry Digital Library)

Robert Fogel and Stanley Engerman, in their 1974 book Time on the Cross, argued that the rate of return of slavery at the market price was close to ten percent, a number close to investment in other assets. The transition from indentured servants to slaves is cited to show that slaves offered greater profits to their owners. A qualified consensus among economic historians and economists is that "Slave agriculture was efficient compared with free agriculture. Economies of scale, effective management, and intensive utilization of labor and capital made southern slave agriculture considerably more efficient than nonslave southern farming", and it is the near-universal consensus among economic historians and economists that slavery was not "a system irrationally kept in existence by plantation owners who failed to perceive or were indifferent to their best economic interests".

The relative price of slaves and indentured servants in the antebellum period did decrease. Indentured servants became more costly with the increase in the demand of skilled labor in England. At the same time, slaves were mostly supplied from within the United States and thus language was not a barrier, and the cost of transporting slaves from one state to another was relatively low.

However, as in Brazil and Europe, slavery at its end in the United States tended to be concentrated in the poorest regions of the United States, with a qualified consensus among economists and economic historians concluding that the "modern period of the South's economic convergence to the level of the North only began in earnest when the institutional foundations of the southern regional labor market were undermined, largely by federal farm and labor legislation dating from the 1930s."

In the decades preceding the Civil War, the black population of the United States experienced a rapid natural increase. Unlike the trans-Saharan slave trade with Africa, the slave population transported by the Atlantic slave trade to the United States was sex-balanced. The slave population multiplied nearly fourfold between 1810 and 1860, despite the passage of the Act Prohibiting Importation of Slaves signed into law by President Thomas Jefferson in 1807 banning the international slave trade. Thus, it is also the universal consensus among modern economic historians and economists that slavery in the United States was not "economically moribund on the eve of the Civil War".

In the 2010s, several historians and sociologists, among them Edward E. Baptist, Sven Beckert, Walter Johnson, Calvin Schermerhorn, and Matthew Desmond have posited that slavery was integral in the development of American capitalism.

Johnson wrote in River of Dark Dreams (2013): "The cords of credit and debt—of advance and obligation—that cinched the Atlantic economy together were anchored with the mutually defining values of land and slaves: without land and slaves, there was no credit, and without slaves, land itself was valueless. Promises made in the Mississippi Valley were backed by the value of slaves and fulfilled in their labor." Other economic historians have rejected that thesis. A 2023 study estimates that prior to the onset of the US Civil War, the enslaved population produced 12.6% of US national product.

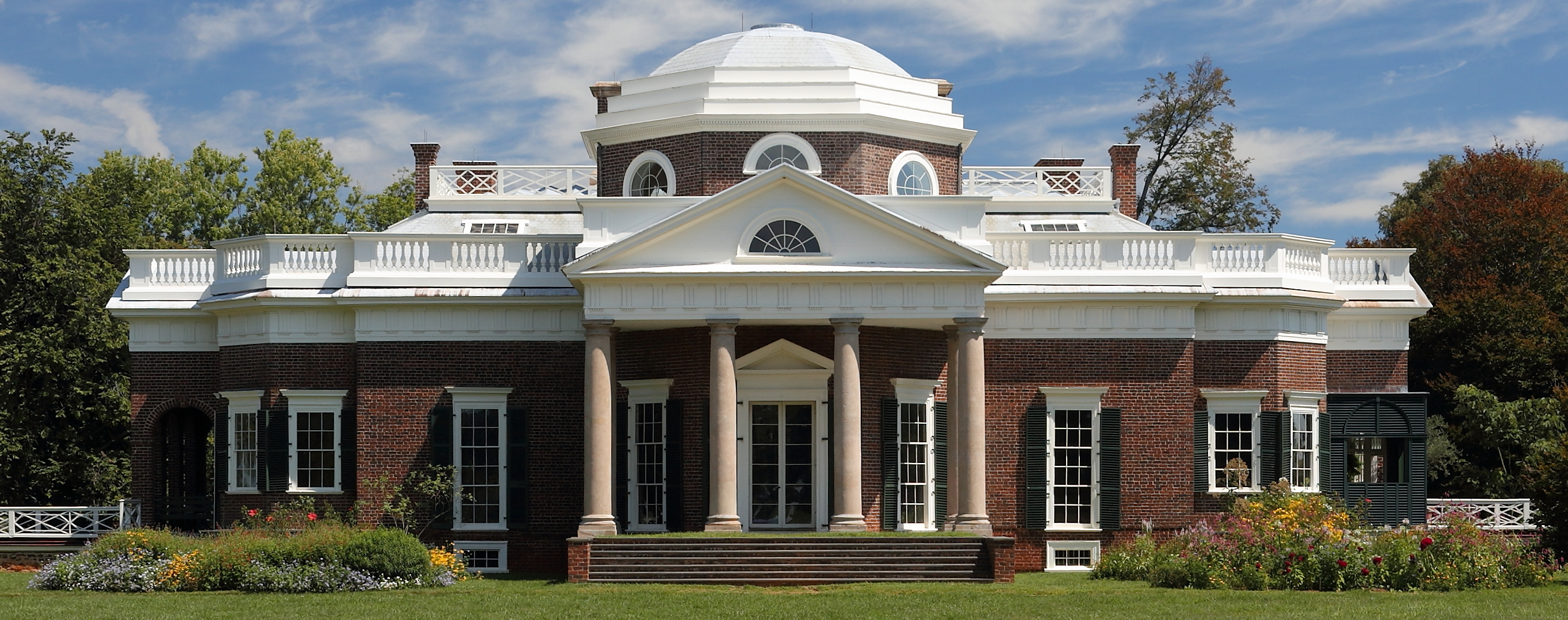
Plantations featuring the forced labor of large numbers of black slaves, such as Monticello owned by Thomas Jefferson, produced wealth for the white elite, the planter class.

Slavery had a long-lasting impact on wealth and racial inequality in the United States. Black families whose ancestors were freed before the start of the Civil War have had better socio-economic outcomes than families who were freed in the Civil War. The end of slavery has seen marginal change in the racial wealth gap. In 1863, two years before emancipation, black people owned 0.5% of the national wealth, while in 2019 it was just over 1.5%.

Those who economically gained the most from slavery were the planter class, owners of large-scale agricultural estates, plantations, where large numbers of enslaved Africans were held captive and forced to produce crops to create wealth for a white elite. Having a prominent role in politics with eight of the 15 presidents before Lincoln owning slaves while in office, at the end of the Civil War the planter class kept control of its land and remained politically influential, with the London School of Economics writing, "this persistence in 'de facto power' in turn allowed them to block economic reforms, disenfranchise black voters, and restrict the mobility of workers."

=== Efficiency of slaves ===
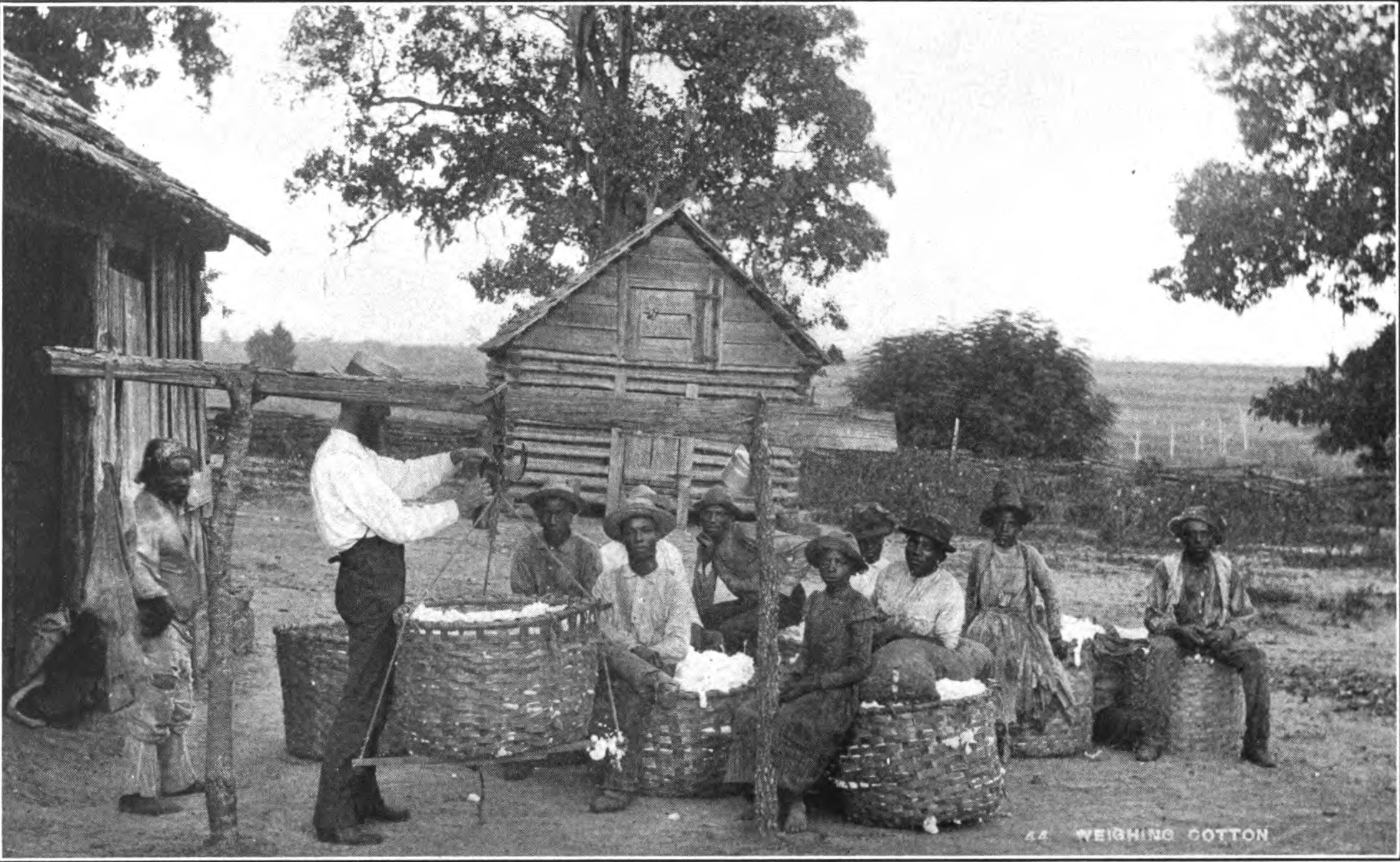
"Weighing cotton after the day's picking" c. 1908 in Monticello, Florida, with a black man in a sack used as the counterweight; when a New York reporter visited a cotton gin in South Carolina in 1851, the managers reported that it cost an average of $75 a year to staff the gin with black slaves, whereas it would have cost $116 to use free whites

Scholars disagree on how to quantify the efficiency of slavery. In Time on the Cross Fogel and Engerman equate efficiency to total factor productivity (TFP), the output per average unit of input on a farm. Using this measurement, Southern farms that enslaved black people using the gang system were 35% more efficient than Northern farms, which used free labor.

Under the gang system, groups of slaves perform synchronized tasks under the constant vigilance of an overseer. Each group was like a part of a machine. If perceived to be working below his capacity, a slave could be punished. Fogel argues that this kind of negative enforcement was not frequent and that slaves and free laborers had a similar quality of life; however, there is controversy on this last point. A critique of Fogel and Engerman's view was published by Paul A. David in 1976.

In 1995, a random survey of 178 members of the Economic History Association sought to study the views of economists and economic historians on the debate. The study found that 72% of economists and 65% of economic historians would generally agree that "Slave agriculture was efficient compared with free agriculture.

Economies of scale, effective management, and intensive utilization of labor and capital made southern slave agriculture considerably more efficient than nonslave southern farming." On the other hand, 58% of economic historians and 42% of economists disagreed with Fogel and Engerman's "proposition that the material (not psychological) conditions of the lives of slaves compared favorably with those of free industrial workers in the decades before the Civil War".

Eric Hilt noted that, while some historians have suggested slavery was necessary for the Industrial Revolution (on the grounds that American slave plantations produced most of the raw cotton for the British textiles market and the British textiles market was the vanguard of the Industrial Revolution), it is not clear whether this is true; there is no evidence that cotton could not have been mass-produced by yeoman farmers rather than slave plantations if the latter had not existed (as their existence tended to force yeoman farmers into subsistence farming), and there is some evidence that they could have.

The soil and climate of the American South were excellent for growing cotton, so it is not unreasonable to postulate that farms without slaves could have produced substantial amounts of cotton; even if they did not produce as much as the plantations did, it could still have been enough to meet the demand of British producers. Similar arguments have been made by other historians.

=== Prices of slaves ===
The U.S. has a capitalist economy, so the price of slaves was determined by the law of supply and demand. For example, following bans on the import of slaves after the UK's Slave Trade Act 1807 and the American 1807 Act Prohibiting Importation of Slaves, the prices for slaves increased. The markets for the products produced by slaves also affected the price of slaves (e.g. the price of slaves fell when the price of cotton fell in 1840). Anticipation of slavery's abolition also influenced prices. During the Civil War the price for slave men in New Orleans dropped from $1,381 in 1861 to $1,116 by 1862 (the city was captured by U.S. forces in the Spring of 1862).

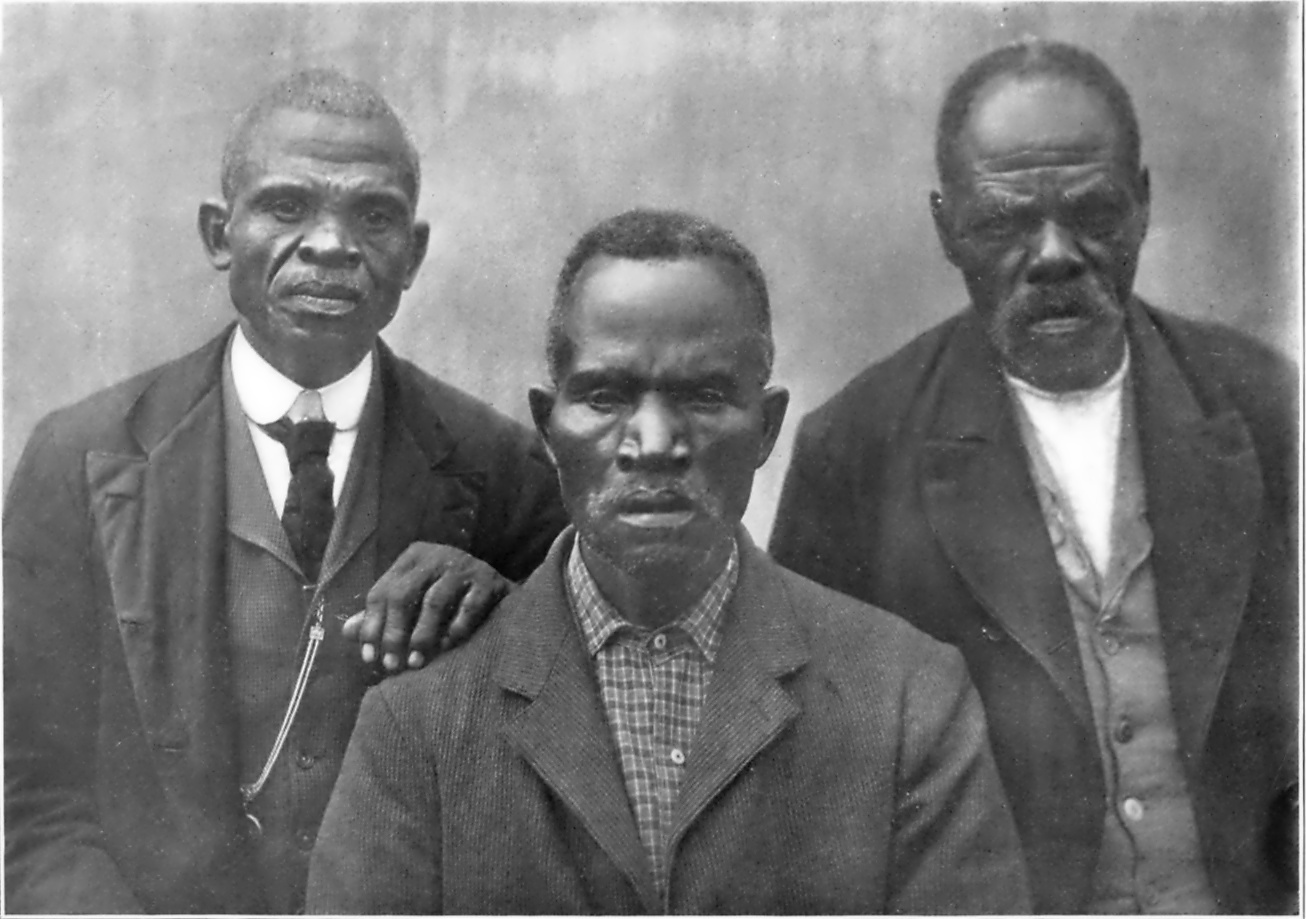
Survivors of the Wanderer: Ward Lee, Tucker Henderson, and Romeo—born Cilucängy, Pucka Gaeta, and Tahro in the Congo River basin—were purchased at a Portuguese-run African slave market in 1858 for an estimated US$50 (equivalent to $1,861 in 2025) each, and resold in the United States where the fair-market price for a healthy young enslaved male was easily US$1,000 (equivalent to $37,212 in 2025) (Charles J. Montgomery, American Anthropologist, 1908)

Controlling for inflation, prices of slaves rose dramatically in the six decades prior to the Civil War, reflecting demand due to commodity cotton, as well as use of slaves in shipping and manufacturing. Although the prices of slaves relative to indentured servants declined, both got more expensive. Cotton production was rising and relied on the use of slaves to yield high profits. Fogel and Engeman initially argued that if the Civil War had not happened, the slave prices would have increased even more, an average of more than 50% by 1890.

Prices reflected the characteristics of the slave; such factors as sex, age, nature, and height were all taken into account to determine the price of a slave. Over the life-cycle, the price of enslaved women was higher than their male counterparts up to puberty age, as they would likely bear children who their masters could sell as slaves and could be used as slave laborers.

If slaves had a history of fights or escapes, their price was lowered reflecting what planters believed was risk of repeating such behavior. Slave traders and buyers would examine a slave's back for whipping scars; a large number of injuries would be seen as evidence of laziness or rebelliousness, rather than the previous master's brutality, and would lower the slave's price. Taller male slaves were priced at a higher level, as height was viewed as a proxy for fitness and productivity.

=== Effects on Southern economic development ===
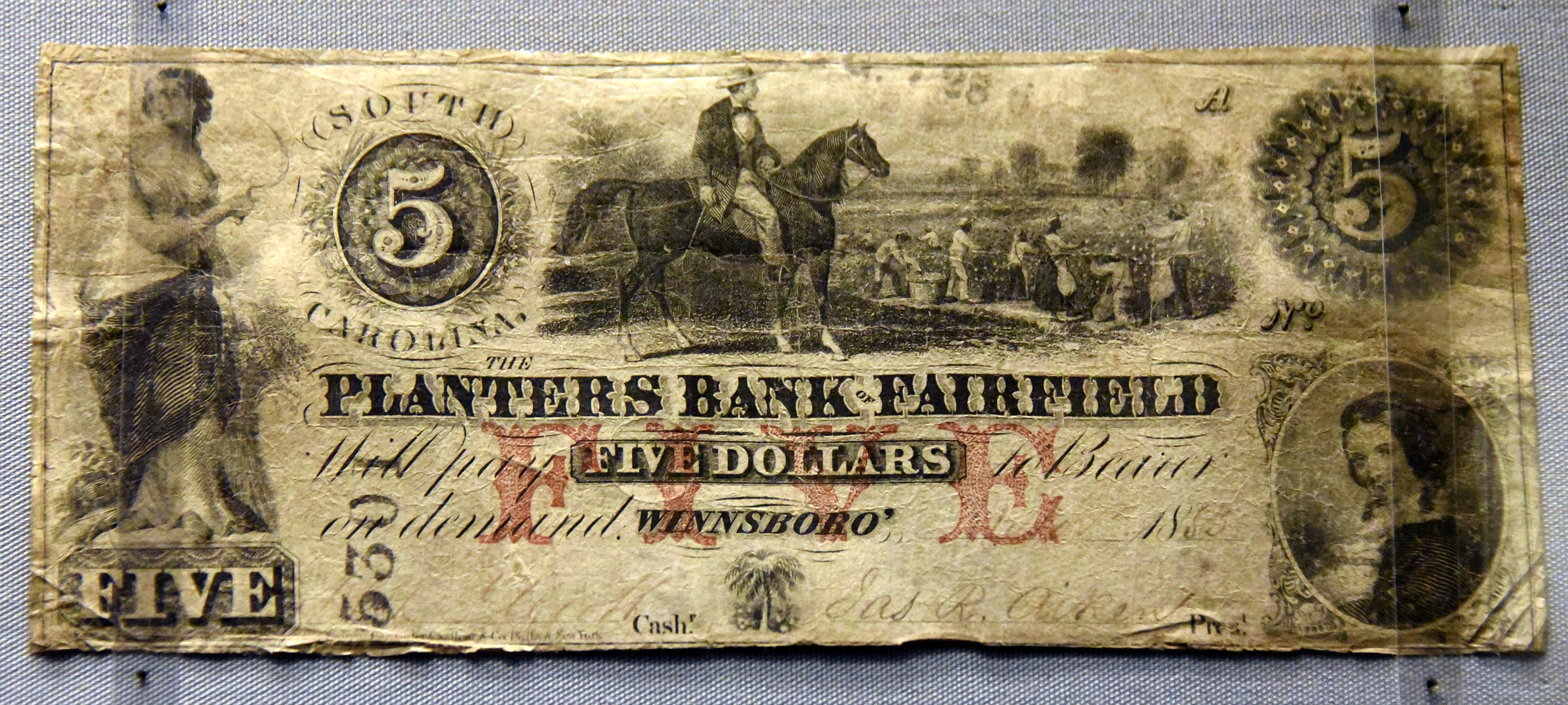
Five-dollar banknote showing a plantation scene with enslaved people in South Carolina. Issued by the Planters Bank, Winnsboro, 1853. On display at the British Museum in London.

While slavery brought profits in the short run, discussion continues on the economic benefits of slavery in the long run. In 1995, a random anonymous survey of 178 members of the Economic History Association found that out of the forty propositions about American economic history that were surveyed, the group of propositions most disputed by economic historians and economists were those about the postbellum economy of the American South (along with the Great Depression).

The only exception was the proposition initially put forward by historian Gavin Wright that the "modern period of the South's economic convergence to the level of the North only began in earnest when the institutional foundations of the southern regional labor market were undermined, largely by federal farm and labor legislation dating from the 1930s." 62% of economists (24% with and 38% without provisos) and 73% of historians (23% with and 50% without provisos) agreed with this statement.

Wright has also argued that the private investment of monetary resources in the cotton industry, among others, delayed development in the South of commercial and industrial institutions. There was little public investment in railroads or other infrastructure. Wright argues that agricultural technology was far more developed in the South, representing an economic advantage of the South over the North of the United States.

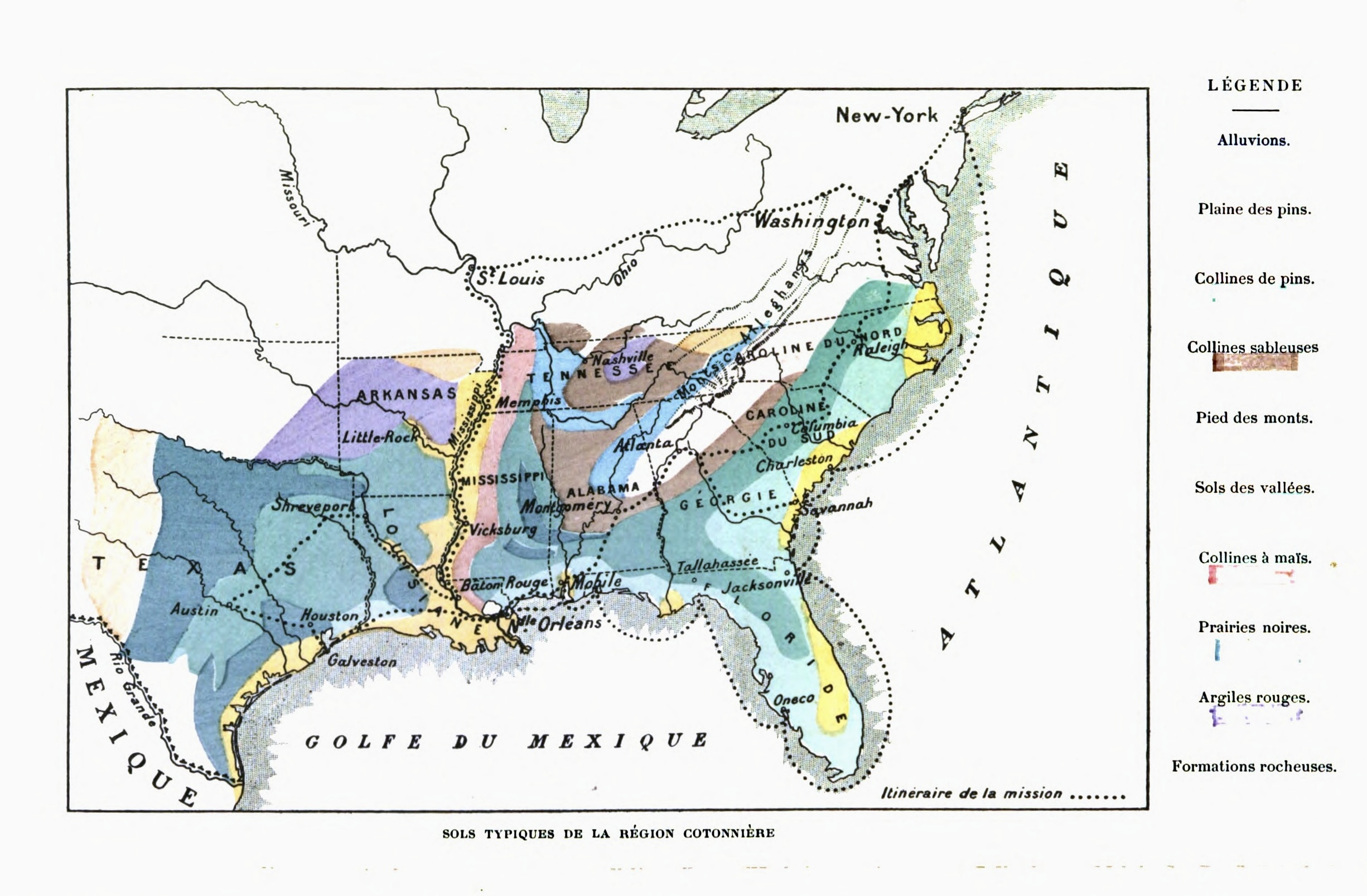
Soils of the cotton-growing regions of the United States

In Democracy in America, Alexis de Tocqueville noted that "the colonies in which there were no slaves became more populous and more rich than those in which slavery flourished". In 1857, in The Impending Crisis of the South: How to Meet It, Hinton Rowan Helper made the same point.

Economists Peter H. Lindert and Jeffrey G. Williamson, in a pair of articles published in 2012 and 2013, found that, despite the American South initially having per capita income roughly double that of the North in 1774, incomes in the South had declined 27% by 1800 and continued to decline over the next four decades, while the economies in New England and the Mid-Atlantic states vastly expanded. By 1840, per capita income in the South was well behind the Northeast and the national average (Note: this is also true in the early 21st century).

Lindert and Williamson argue that this antebellum period is an example of what economists Daron Acemoglu, Simon Johnson, and James A. Robinson call "a reversal of fortune". In his essay "The Real History of Slavery", economist Thomas Sowell reiterated and augmented the observation made by de Tocqueville by comparing slavery in the United States to slavery in Brazil. He notes that slave societies reflected similar economic trends in those and other parts of the world, suggesting that the trend Lindert and Williamson identify may have continued until the American Civil War:

Both in Brazil and in the United States – the countries with the two largest slave populations in the Western Hemisphere – the end of slavery found the regions in which slaves had been concentrated poorer than other regions of these same countries. For the United States, a case could be made that this was due to the Civil War, which did so much damage to the South, but no such explanation would apply to Brazil, which fought no Civil War over this issue. Moreover, even in the United States, the South lagged behind the North in many ways even before the Civil War. Although slavery in Europe died out before it was abolished in the Western Hemisphere, as late as 1776 slavery had not yet died out all across the continent when Adam Smith wrote in The Wealth of Nations that it still existed in some eastern regions. But, even then, Eastern Europe was much poorer than Western Europe. The slavery of North Africa and the Middle East, over the centuries, took more slaves from sub-Saharan Africa than the Western Hemisphere did ... But these remained largely poor countries until the discovery and extraction of their vast oil deposits.

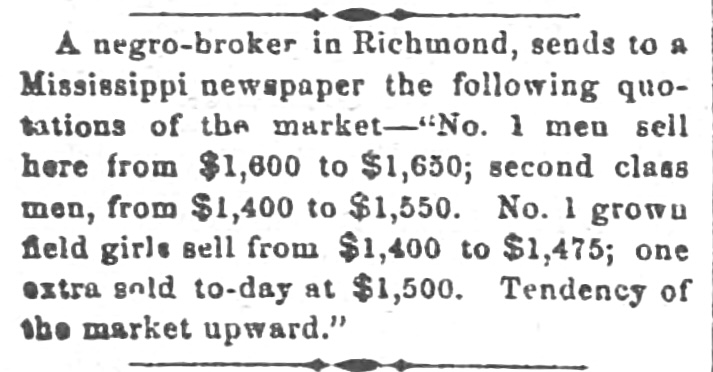
Market update, published on the eve of the American Civil War: Here the sell-side (Virginia) prepares the buy-side (Mississippi) for expected prices in the 1860–61 slave-trading season (The Wheeling Daily Intelligencer, August 11, 1860).

Sowell also notes in Ethnic America: A History, citing historians Clement Eaton and Eugene Genovese, that three-quarters of Southern white families owned no slaves at all. Most slaveholders lived on farms rather than plantations, and few plantations were as large as the fictional ones depicted in Gone with the Wind.

In "The Real History of Slavery", Sowell also notes in comparison to slavery in the Arab world and the Middle East (where slaves were seldom used for productive purposes) and China (where the slaves consumed the entire output they created), Sowell observes that many commercial slaveowners in the antebellum South tended to be spendthrift and many lost their plantations due to creditor foreclosures, and in Britain, profits by British slave traders amounted to only 2% of British domestic investment at the height of the Atlantic slave trade in the 18th century.

Sowell draws the following conclusion regarding the macroeconomic value of slavery:

In short, even though some individual slaveowners grew rich and some family fortunes were founded on the exploitation of slaves, that is very different from saying that the whole society, or even its non-slave population as a whole, was more economically advanced than it would have been in the absence of slavery. What this means is that, whether employed as domestic servants or producing crops or other goods, millions suffered exploitation and dehumanization for no higher purpose than the ... aggrandizement of slaveowners.

=== Sexual economy of American slavery ===
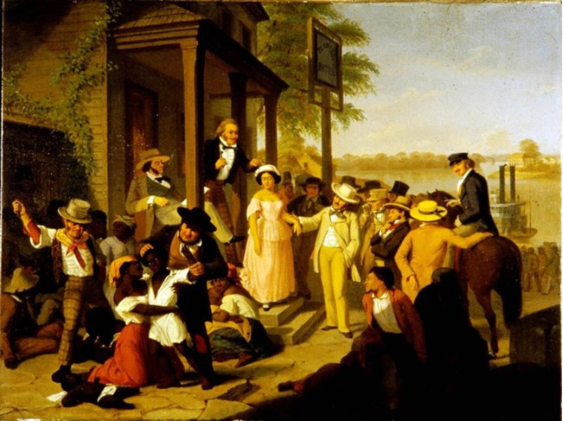
Slave Market, artist unknown, date unknown (Carnegie Museum of Art, Pittsburgh)

Scholar Adrienne Davis articulates how the economics of slavery also can be defined as a sexual economy, specifically focusing on how black women were expected to perform physical, sexual and reproductive labor to provide a consistent enslaved workforce and increase the profits of white slavers.

Davis writes that black women were needed for their "sexual and reproductive labor to satisfy the economic, political, and personal interest of white men of the elite class" articulating that black women's reproductive capacity was important in the maintenance of the system of slavery due to its ability to perpetuate an enslaved workforce. She is also drawing attention to black women's labor being needed to maintain the aristocracy of a white ruling class, due to the intimate nature of reproduction and its potential for producing more enslaved peoples.

Due to the institution of partus sequitur ventrem, black women's wombs became the site where slavery was developed and transferred, meaning that black women were not only used for their physical labor, but for their sexual and reproductive labor as well.

"The rule that the children's status follows their mothers' was a foundational one for our economy. It converted enslaved women's reproductive capacity into market capital"

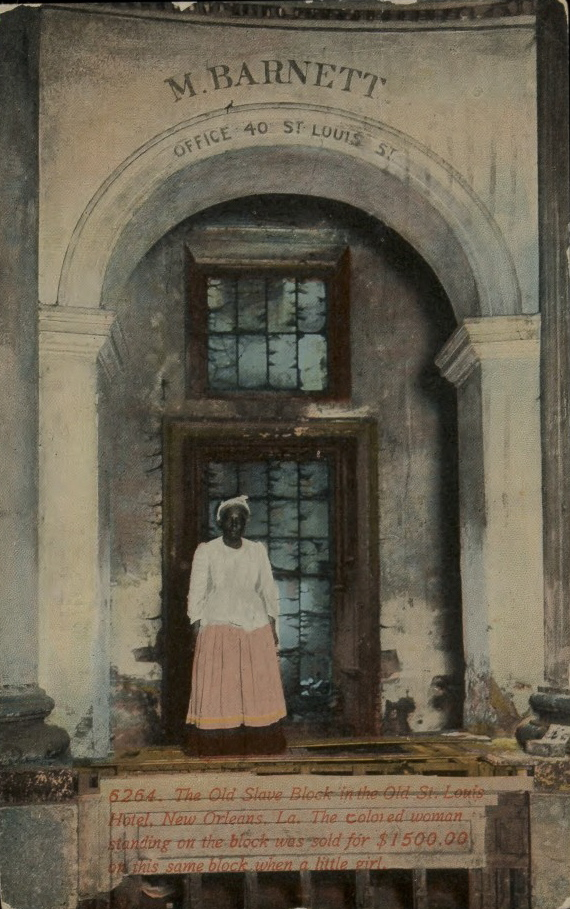
Divided-back era postcard: "The Old Slave Block in the Old St. Louis Hotel, New Orleans, La. The colored woman standing on the block was sold for $1500.00 on this same block when a little girl."

This articulation by Davis illustrates how black women's reproductive capacity was commodified under slavery, and that an analysis of the economic structures of slavery requires an acknowledgment of how pivotal black women's sexuality was in maintaining slavery's economic power.

Davis writes how black women performed labor under slavery, writing: "[black women were] male when convenient and horrifically female when needed". The fluctuating expectations of black women's gendered labor under slavery disrupted the white normative roles that were assigned to white men and white women. This ungendering black women received under slavery contributed to the systemic dehumanization experienced by enslaved black women, as they were unable to receive the expectations or experiences of either gender within the white binary.

Davis's arguments address the fact that, under slavery, black women's sexuality became linked to the economic and public sphere, making their intimate lives into public institutions. Black women's physical labor was gendered as masculine under slavery when they were needed to yield more profit, but their reproductive capacities and sexual labor were equally as important in maintaining white power over black communities and perpetuating an enslaved workforce.

== Geography and demography ==
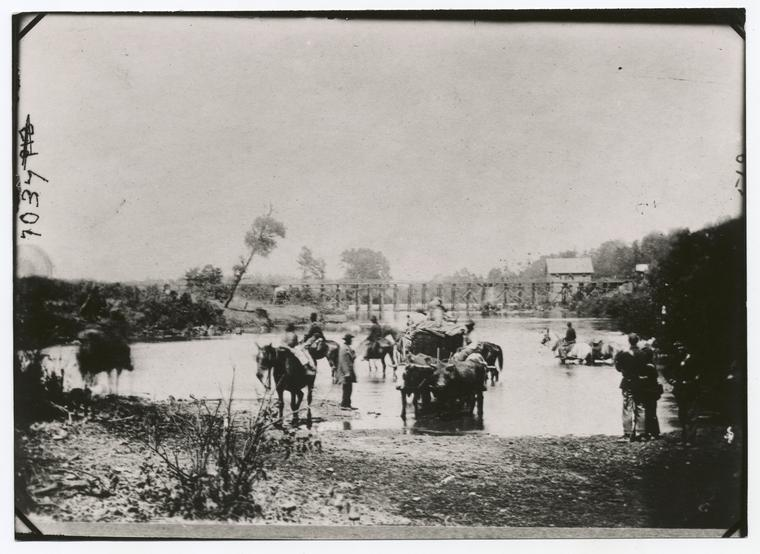
"Fugitive Negroes, fording Rappahannock river following Pope's retreat, Aug. 1862" (New York Public Library)

=== Slave importation ===
About 600,000 slaves were transported to the United States, or 5% of the 12 million slaves taken from Africa. About 310,000 of these persons were imported into the Thirteen Colonies before 1776, 40% directly and the rest from the Caribbean.

Slaves trafficked to the British colonies and United States:
Time period	Quantity
1620–1700	21,000
1701–1760	189,000
1761–1770	63,000
1771–1790	56,000
1791–1800	79,000
1801–1810	124,000
1810–1865	51,000
Total	597,000

The great majority of enslaved Africans were transported to sugar plantations in the Caribbean and to Portuguese Brazil. As life expectancy was short, their numbers had to be continually replenished. Life expectancy was much higher in the United States, and the enslaved population was successful in reproduction, which was called "natural increase" by enslavers. The population of enslaved people in the United States grew to 4 million by the 1860 census. Historian J. David Hacker conducted research that estimated that the cumulative number of slaves in colonial America and the United States (1619–1865) was 10 million.

=== Origins of American slaves ===
Origins and percentages of Africans imported into British North America and Louisiana (1700–1820)
Origin	Amount % (exceeds 100%)
West-central Africa (Kongo, N. Mbundu, S. Mbundu)	26.1
Bight of Biafra (Igbo, Tikar, Ibibio, Bamileke, Bubi)	24.4
Sierra Leone (Mende, Temne)	15.8
Senegambia (Mandinka, Fula, Wolof)	14.5
Gold Coast (Akan, Fon)	13.1
Windward Coast (Mandé, Kru)	5.2
Bight of Benin (Yoruba, Ewe, Fon, Allada and Mahi)	4.3
Southeast Africa (Macua, Malagasy)	1.8

=== Distribution of slaves ===
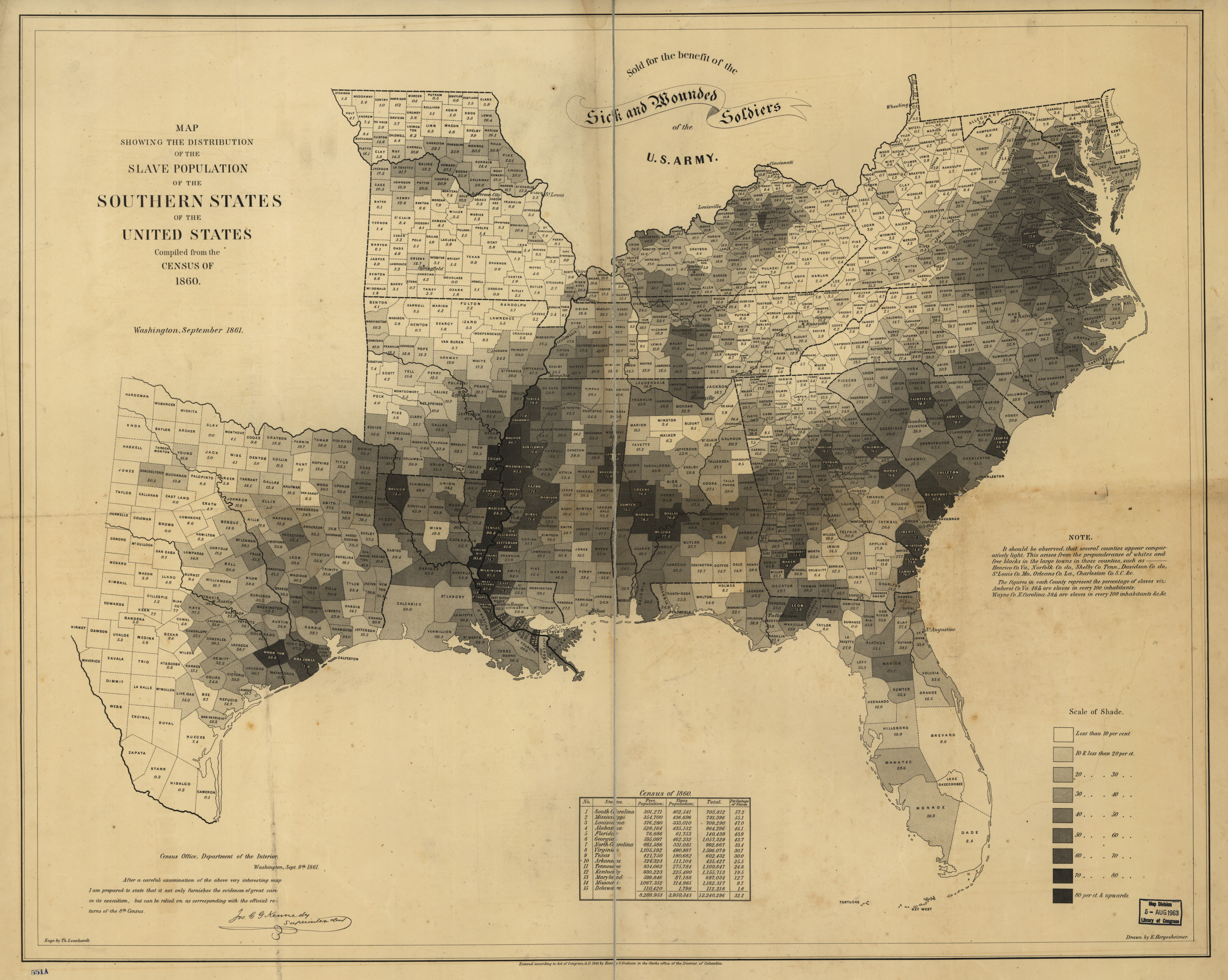
Map showing the distribution of the slave population of the southern states of the United States (1861) created by Edwin Hergesheimer of the United States Coast Survey; Lincoln kept a copy of this map in the White House and studied it often, using it to track Union troop movements

Census Year	# Slaves	# Free Africans	Total Africans	% Free Africans	Total US population	% Africans of total
1790	697,681	59,527	757,208	8%	3,929,214	19%
1800	893,602	108,435	1,002,037	11%	5,308,483	19%
1810	1,191,362	186,446	1,377,808	14%	7,239,881	19%
1820	1,538,022	233,634	1,771,656	13%	9,638,453	18%
1830	2,009,043	319,599	2,328,642	14%	12,860,702	18%
1840	2,487,355	386,293	2,873,648	13%	17,063,353	17%
1850	3,204,313	434,495	3,638,808	12%	23,191,876	16%
1860	3,953,760	488,070	4,441,830	11%	31,443,321	14%
1870	0	4,880,009	4,880,009	100%	38,558,371	13%
Source:"Distribution of Slaves in U.S. History".

Evolution of the enslaved population of the United States as a percentage of the population of each state, 1790–1860

Total Slave Population in U.S., 1790–1860, by State and Territory
Census Year	1790	1800	1810	1820	1830	1840	1850	1860
All States	694,207	893,308	1,191,338	1,531,490	2,009,079	2,487,392	3,204,215	3,953,820
Alabama	–	494	2,565	41,879	117,549	253,532	342,844	435,080
Arkansas	–	–	136	1,617	4,576	19,935	47,100	111,115
California	–	–	–	–	–	–	0	0
Connecticut	2,648	951	310	97	25	54	0	0
Delaware	8,887	6,153	4,177	4,509	3,292	2,605	2,290	1,798
District of Columbia	–	2,072	3,554	4,520	4,505	3,320	3,687	3,185
Florida	–	–	–	–	15,501	25,717	39,310	61,745
Georgia	29,264	59,699	105,218	149,656	217,531	280,944	381,682	462,198
Illinois	–	107	168	917	747	331	0	0
Indiana	–	28	237	190	3	3	0	0
Iowa	–	–	–	–	–	16	0	0
Kansas	–	–	–	–	–	–	–	2
Kentucky	12,430	40,343	80,561	126,732	165,213	182,258	210,981	225,483
Louisiana	–	–	34,660	69,064	109,588	168,452	244,809	331,726
Maine	–	–	–	–	2	0	0	0
Maryland	103,036	105,635	111,502	107,398	102,994	89,737	90,368	87,189
Massachusetts	0	0	0	0	1	0	0	0
Michigan	–	–	24	0	1	0	0	0
Minnesota	–	–	–	–	–	–	0	0
Mississippi	–	2,995	14,523	32,814	65,659	195,211	309,878	436,631
Missouri	–	–	–	10,222	25,096	58,240	87,422	114,931
Nebraska	–	–	–	–	–	–	–	15
Nevada	–	–	–	–	–	–	–	0
New Hampshire	157	8	0	0	3	1	0	0
New Jersey	11,423	12,422	10,851	7,557	2,254	674	236	18
New York	21,193	20,613	15,017	10,088	75	4	0	0
North Carolina	100,783	133,296	168,824	205,017	245,601	245,817	288,548	331,059
Ohio	–	0	0	0	6	3	0	0
Oregon	–	–	–	–	–	–	0	0
Pennsylvania	3,707	1,706	795	211	403	64	0	0
Rhode Island	958	380	108	48	17	5	0	0
South Carolina	107,094	146,151	196,365	251,783	315,401	327,038	384,984	402,406
Tennessee	3,417	13,584	44,535	80,107	141,603	183,059	239,459	275,719
Texas	–	–	–	–	–	–	58,161	182,566
Utah	–	–	–	–	–	–	26	29
Vermont	0	0	0	0	0	0	0	0
Virginia	287,959	339,499	383,521	411,886	453,698	431,873	452,028	472,494
West Virginia	4,668	7,172	10,836	15,178	17,673	18,488	20,428	18,371
Wisconsin	–	–	–	–	–	11	4	0

For various reasons, the census did not always include all of the slaves, especially in the West, and also black slaves owned by Native-American in the Southeast. New Mexico Territory never reported any slaves on the census, yet sued the government for compensation for 600 slaves that were freed when Congress outlawed slavery in the territory. Utah was actively trying to hide its slave population from Congress and did not report slaves in several communities.

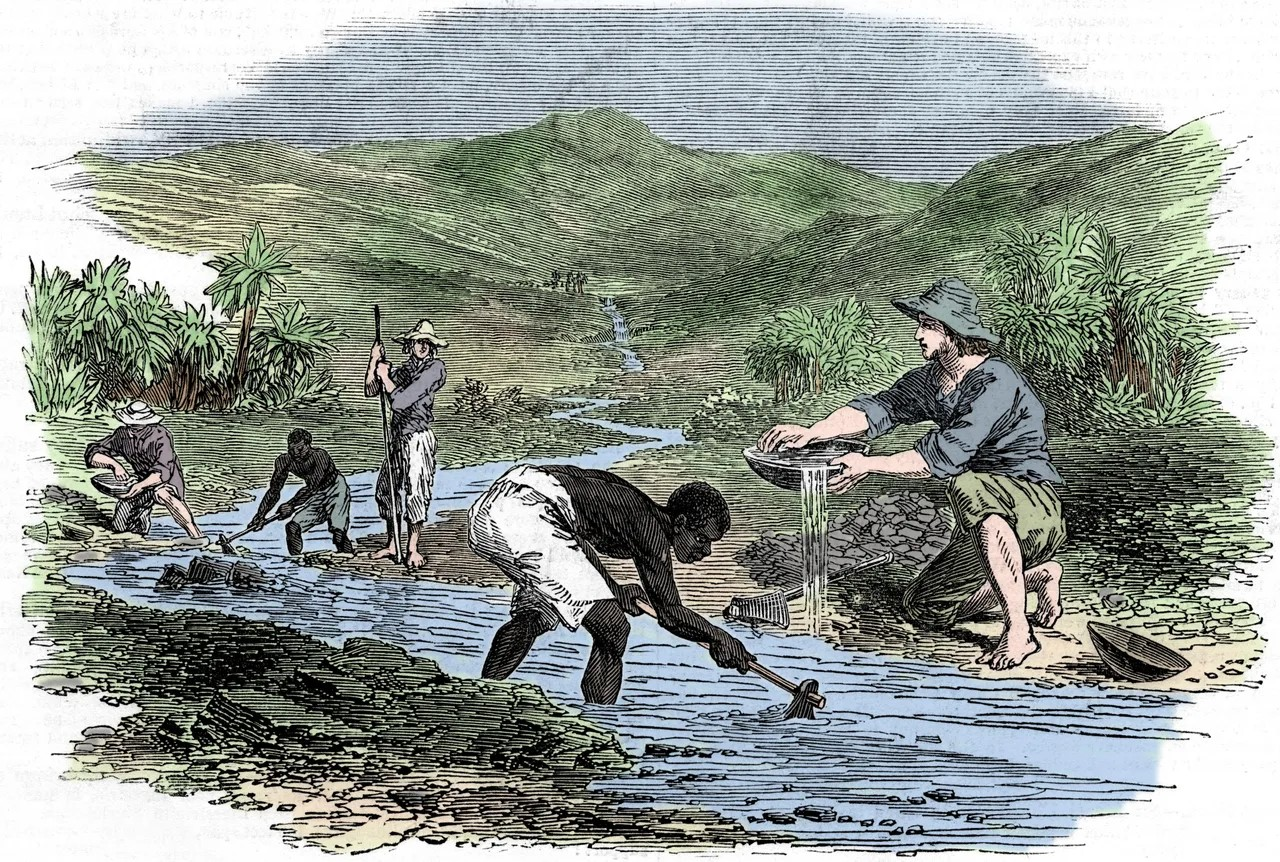
African American slaves working for their masters who had come to California in search of gold, 1849.

California was admitted as a free state and reported no slaves. However, there were many slaves that were brought to work in the mines during the California Gold Rush. Some Californian communities openly tolerated slavery, such as San Bernardino, which was mostly made up of transplants from the neighboring slave territory of Utah. Additionally, the census did not traditionally include Native Americans, and hence did not include Native American slaves. The 1850 Act for the Government and Protection of Indians introduced a system of custodianship for indigenous children and established convict leasing as a form of slavery or forced labor in California. White settlers took 10,000 to 27,000 Native Americans as forced laborers in California, including 4,000 to 7,000 children. There were other Native American slaves in Utah and New Mexico that were never recorded in the census.

=== Distribution of slaveholders ===
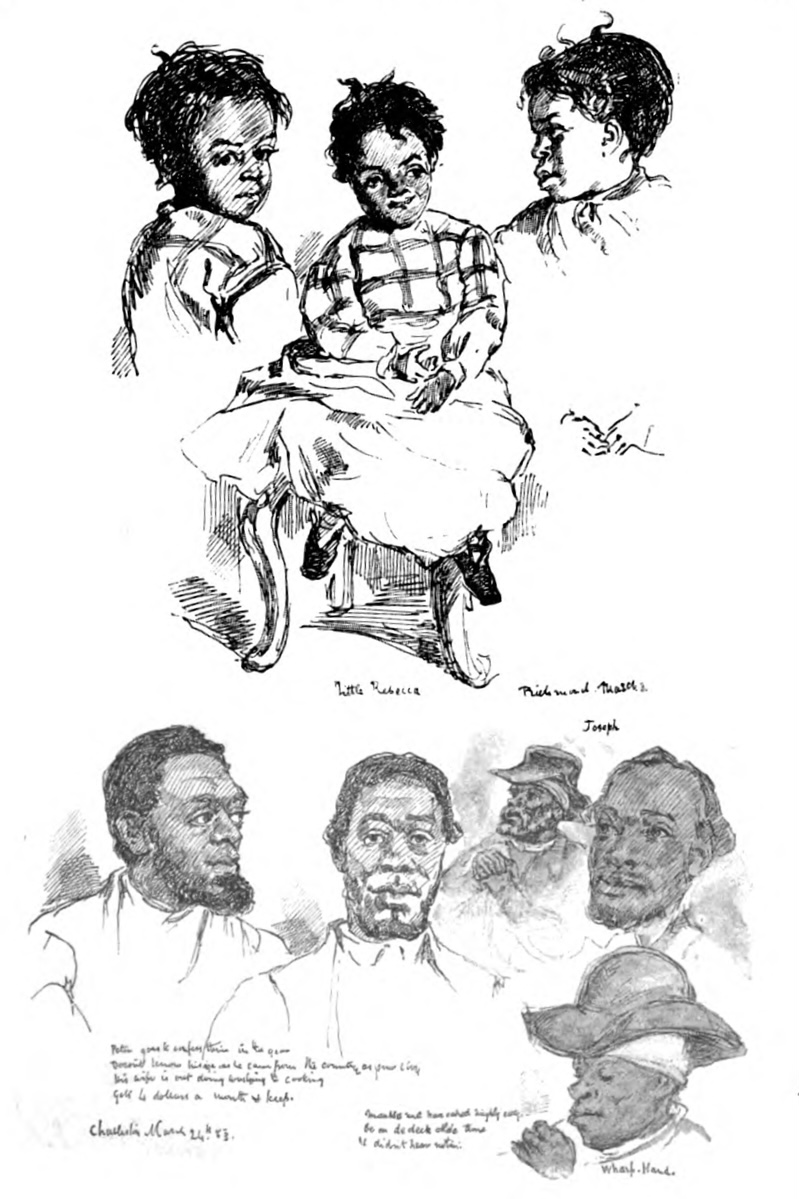
Sketches of enslaved Americans in Richmond and Charleston, made by British artist Eyre Crowe, March 1853

As of the 1860 census, one may compute the following statistics on slaveholding:

- Enumerating slave schedules by county, 393,975 named persons held 3,950,546 unnamed slaves, for an average of about ten slaves per holder. As some large holders held slaves in multiple counties and are thus multiply counted, this slightly overestimates the number of slaveholders.
- Excluding slaves, the 1860 U.S. population was 27,167,529; therefore, approximately 1.45% of free persons (roughly one in 69) was a named slaveholder (393,975 named slaveholders among 27,167,529 free persons). By counting only named slaveholders, this approach does not acknowledge people who benefited from slavery by being in a slaveowning household, e.g., the wife and children of an owner; in 1850, there was an average of 5.55 people per household, so on average, around 8.05% of free persons lived in a slave-owning household. According to historian Joseph Glatthaar, the number of soldiers of the Confederacy's Army of Northern Virginia who either owned slaves or came from slave owning households is "almost one of every two 1861 recruits". In addition he notes that, "Untold numbers of enlistees rented land from, sold crops to, or worked for slaveholders. In the final tabulation, the vast majority of the volunteers of 1861 had a direct connection to slavery."
- It is estimated by the transcriber Tom Blake, that holders of 200 or more slaves, constituting less than 1% of all U.S. slaveholders (fewer than 4,000 persons, one in 7,000 free persons, or 0.015% of the population) held an estimated 20–30% of all slaves (800,000 to 1,200,000 slaves). Nineteen holders of 500 or more slaves have been identified. The largest slaveholder was Joshua John Ward, of Georgetown, South Carolina, who in 1850 held 1,092 slaves, and whose heirs in 1860 held 1,130 or 1,131 slaves – he was dubbed "the king of the rice planters", and one of his plantations is now part of Brookgreen Gardens.
- The percentage of families that owned slaves in 1860 in various groupings of states was as follows:

Group of States	States in Group	Slave-Owning Families
15 states where slavery was legal	Alabama, Arkansas, Delaware, Florida, Georgia, Kentucky, Louisiana, Maryland, Mississippi, Missouri, North Carolina, South Carolina, Tennessee, Texas, Virginia	26%
11 states that seceded	Alabama, Arkansas, Florida, Georgia, Louisiana, Mississippi, North Carolina, South Carolina, Tennessee, Texas, Virginia	31%
7 states that seceded before Lincoln's inauguration	Alabama, Florida, Georgia, Louisiana, Mississippi, South Carolina, Texas	37%
4 states that seceded later	Arkansas, North Carolina, Tennessee, Virginia	25%
4 slave states that did not secede	Delaware, Kentucky, Maryland, Missouri	16%

== Historiography ==
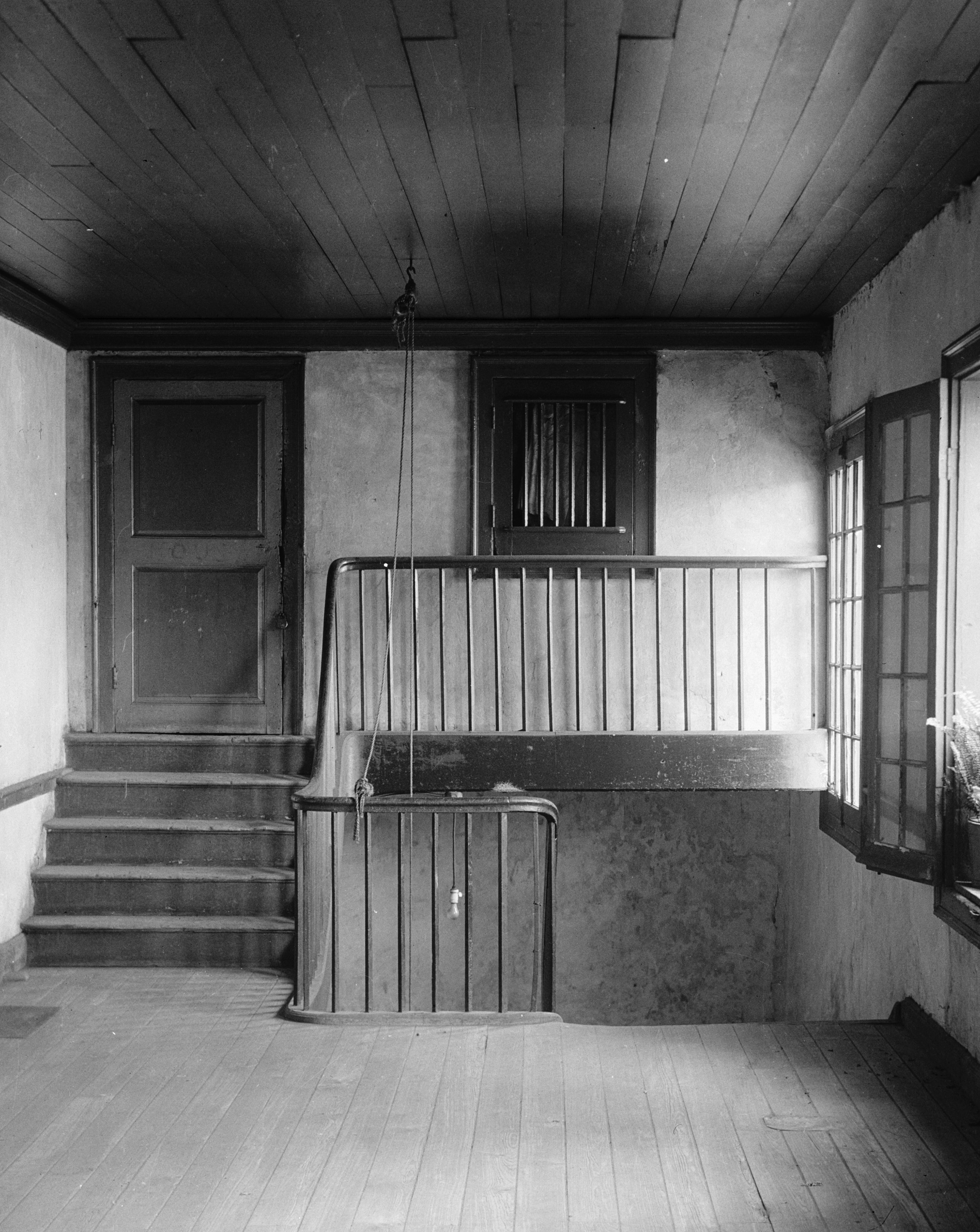
"Window grating of old slave prison cell" at Girod House, 500–506 Chartres, New Orleans (Richard Koch, Historic American Buildings Survey, April 1934)

Early historical writing on American slavery, particularly in the late 19th and early 20th centuries, often reflected the racial attitudes of the time. Influenced by the Lost Cause narrative, many historians portrayed slavery as a relatively benign institution with passive or content slaves. Ulrich Bonnell Phillips was a leading figure in this school of thought, focusing on plantation economics and framing slavery as economically backward but socially civilizing. Black perspectives were largely absent from mainstream historiography during this period, though some early work was advanced in historically Black colleges and universities.

A major historiographical shift occurred in the mid-20th century. Kenneth M. Stampp challenged earlier narratives by emphasizing the brutality and exploitation of slavery and highlighting enslaved people's resistance. Stanley Elkins took a psychological approach, controversially comparing the effects of slavery to those of totalitarian systems like Nazi concentration camps. By the 1970s, historians such as John Blassingame, Eugene Genovese, and Herbert Gutman used sources like slave narratives, plantation records, folklore, and WPA interviews to develop more nuanced portrayals of enslaved life, showing how enslaved people built communities, maintained families, and exercised degrees of autonomy within a system of oppression.

In the same period, economic historians Robert Fogel and Stanley Engerman sparked debate with their work Time on the Cross (1974), which used cliometric methods to argue that slavery was economically efficient and that the material conditions of slaves were not substantially worse than those of contemporary free laborers. Their conclusions drew widespread criticism for downplaying the human costs of slavery. More recently, scholars like Steven Hahn have explored the political lives of enslaved people, demonstrating how they built forms of collective identity and political consciousness that shaped post-emancipation society. Economic models, such as those proposed by Robert E. Wright, have further examined why slavery persisted more intensely in some regions and industries than others.

== Summaries by survivors of slavery ==
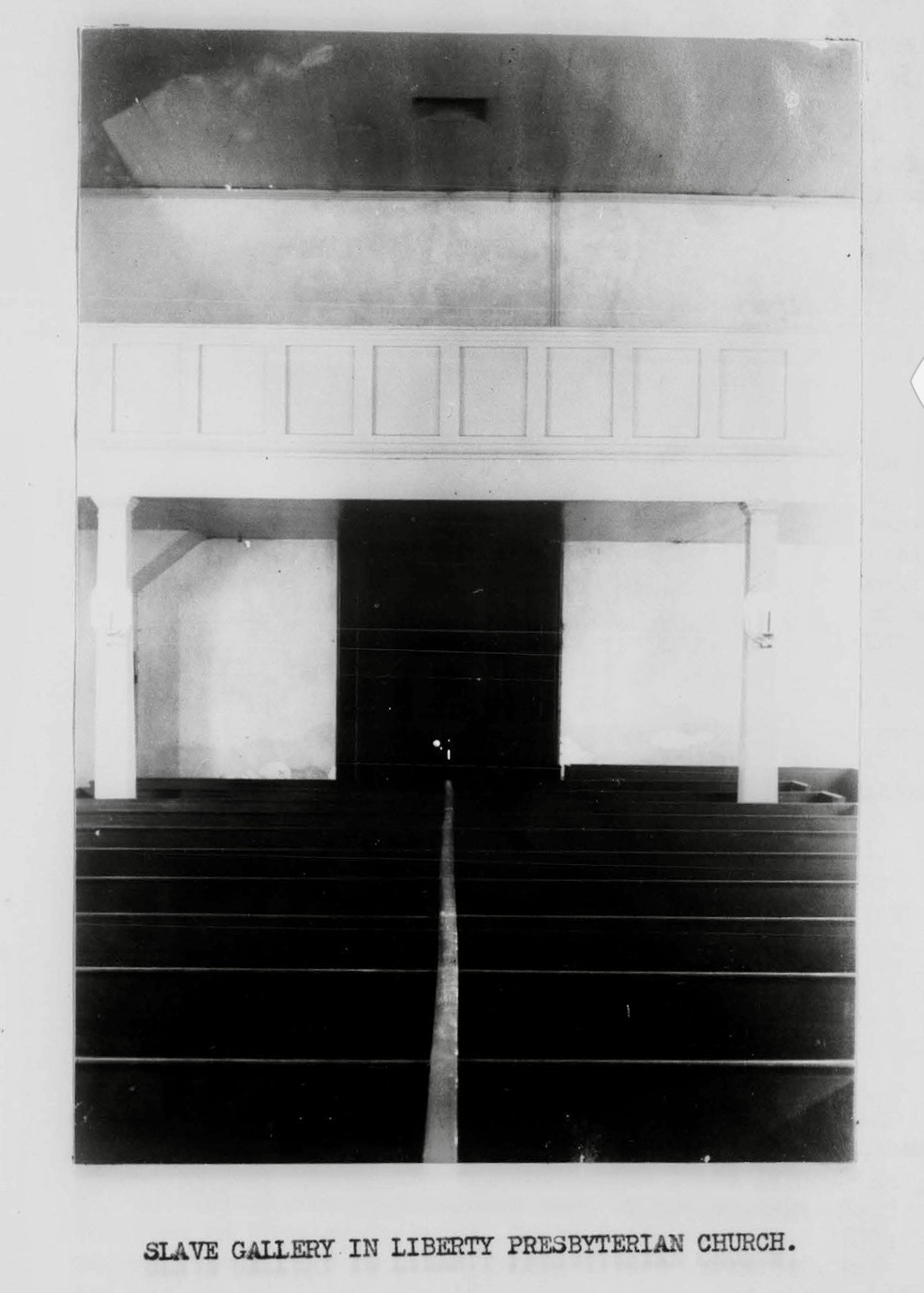
Slave gallery, Liberty church

Historian Ty Seidule uses a quote from Frederick Douglass's autobiography My Bondage and My Freedom to describe the experience of the average male slave as being "robbed of wife, of children, of his hard earnings, of home, of friends, of society, of knowledge, and of all that makes his life desirable." A quote from a letter by Isabella Gibbons, who had been enslaved by professors at the University of Virginia, is now engraved on the university's Memorial to Enslaved Laborers:

Can we forget the crack of the whip, the cowhide, whipping-post, the auction-block, the spaniels, the iron collar, the negro-trader tearing the young child from its mother's breast as a whelp from the lioness? Have we forgotten that by those horrible cruelties, hundreds of our race have been killed? No, we have not, nor ever will.

== See also ==
- Abolition of slavery timeline
- American Descendants of Slavery (ADOS)
- American slave owners of note
- Biography and the Black Atlantic
- Black Friday etymology hoax
- Glossary of American slavery
- Historiography of the United States § Slavery and black history
- Indian removal
- List of slave owners
- Lists of United States public officials who owned slaves
- Reparations for slavery debate in the United States
- Runaway slaves in Spanish Florida
- Slave insurance in the United States
- Slave narrative § North American slave narratives
  - WPA Slave Narratives Project
- Slavery and Slaving in World History: A Bibliography
- Slavery at American colleges and universities
- Suicide, infanticide, and self-mutilation by slaves in the United States
- Triangular trade

=== Histories of slavery in the Western Hemisphere ===
- Slavery in the Spanish New World colonies
- Slavery in the British and French Caribbean
- Slavery in Cuba
- Slavery in Brazil
- Slavery in Latin America
- Slavery in Canada

== Bibliography ==
=== National and comparative studies ===
- Aptheker, Herbert (1939). Negro Slave Revolts in the United States (1526–1860). New York: International Publishers. Preview.
- —— (1945) [1943]. American Negro Slave Revolts. New York: Columbia University Press. Preview.
- Arthur, John (2007). Race, Equality, and the Burdens of History. Cambridge: Cambridge University Press. Preview
- Baptist, Edward E. (2016). The Half Has Never Been Told: Slavery and the Making of American Capitalism. New York: Basic Books. ISBN 978-0-465-04966-0. Preview.
- Bateman, Fred; Weiss, Thomas (1980). A Deplorable Scarcity: The Failure of Industrialization in the Slave Economy. Chapel Hill, NC: University of North Carolina Press. ISBN 0-8078-1447-4. Preview.
- Beckert, Sven (2014). Empire of Cotton: A Global History. New York: Alfred A. Knopf. ISBN 978-0-375-41414-5. Preview.
- Berlin, Ira (2003). Generations of Captivity: A History of African-American Slaves. Cambridge, MA: Belknap Press of Harvard University Press. ISBN 0-674-01061-2. Preview.
- —— (1998). Many Thousands Gone: The First Two Centuries of Slavery in North America. Cambridge, MA: Belknap Press of Harvard University Press. ISBN 0-674-81092-9. Preview.
- —— (1992) [1974]. Slaves Without Masters: The Free Negro in the Antebellum South. New York: The New Press. ISBN 1-56584-028-3. Preview.
- ——; Hoffman, Ronald, eds. (1983). Slavery and Freedom in the Age of the American Revolution. Charlottesville, VA: University Press of Virginia. ISBN 0-8139-0969-4. Preview.
- Blackburn, Robin (2011). The American Crucible: Slavery, Emancipation and Human Rights. London; New York: Verso. ISBN 978-1-84467-569-2. Preview.
- —— (1988). The Overthrow of Colonial Slavery. London; New York: Verso. ISBN 0-86091-188-8. Preview.
- Blackmon, Douglas A. Slavery by Another Name: The Re-Enslavement of Black Americans from the Civil War to World War II, 2008, ISBN 978-0-385-50625-0. Preview.
- Blassingame, John W. The Slave Community: Plantation Life in the Antebellum South Oxford University Press, 1979, ISBN 0-19-502563-6. Preview.
- Brewster, Francis E. (1850). Slavery and the Constitution. Both Sides of the Question. Philadelphia: Unknown Publisher. Preview.
- Childers, Christopher (2012). The Failure of Popular Sovereignty: Slavery, Manifest Destiny, and the Radicalization of Southern Politics. Lawrence: University Press of Kansas. ISBN 978-0-7006-1868-2. Preview.
- Coughtry, Jay (1981). The Notorious Triangle: Rhode Island and the African Slave Trade, 1700–1807. Philadelphia: Temple University Press. ISBN 0-87722-218-5.
- Davis, David Brion. Inhuman Bondage: The Rise and Fall of Slavery in the New World, 2006.
- —— (1970) [1966]. The Problem of Slavery in Western Culture. London: Pelican Books. Preview.
- Duberman, Martin B., ed. (1965). New Essays on the Abolitionists. Princeton, NJ: Princeton University Press. Preview.
- Egerton, Douglas R. (2009). Death or Liberty: African Americans and Revolutionary America. New York: Oxford University Press. ISBN 978-0-19-530669-9. Preview
- Elkins, Stanley. Slavery: A Problem in American Institutional and Intellectual Life. University of Chicago Press, 1976, ISBN 0-226-20477-4. Preview.
- Fehrenbacher, Don E. Slavery, Law, and Politics: The Dred Scott Case in Historical Perspective, Oxford University Press, 1981. Preview.
- Finkelman, Paul (1981). An Imperfect Union: Slavery, Federalism, and Comity. Chapel Hill: University of North Carolina Press. ISBN 0-8078-1438-5. Preview.
- Fogel, Robert W. Without Consent or Contract: The Rise and Fall of American Slavery, W.W. Norton, 1989. Preview.
- ——; Engerman, Stanley L. (1995). Time on the Cross: The Economics of American Negro Slavery. New York: W.W. Norton Company, Inc. ISBN 0-393-31218-6. Preview.
- Foner, Eric; Brown, Joshua (2005). Forever Free: The Story of Emancipation and Reconstruction. New York: Alfred A. Knopf. ISBN 0-375-40259-4.Preview.
- —— (2015). Gateway to Freedom: The Hidden History of the Underground Railroad. New York: W.W. Norton & Company. ISBN 978-0-393-35219-1. Preview.
- —— (2010). The Fiery Trial: Abraham Lincoln and American Slavery. New York: W. W. Norton & Co. ISBN 978-0-393-06618-0. Pulitzer Prize. Preview.
- Franklin, John Hope and Loren Schweninger. Runaway Slaves: Rebels on the Plantation, 1999, ISBN 0-19-508449-7. Preview.
- Fredrickson, George M. (1971). The Black Image in the White Mind: The Debate on Afro-American Character and Destiny, 1817–1914. New York: Harper & Row. SBN 06-011343-X. Preview.
- Freehling, William W. (2007) [1990]. The Road to Disunion, Volume I: Secessionists at Bay. New York: Oxford University Press. ISBN 978-0-19-505814-7. Preview.
- —— (2007) [1990]. The Road to Disunion, Volume II: Secessionists Triumph. New York: Oxford University Press. ISBN 978-0-19-505815-4.Preview.
- Frey, Sylvia R. (1991). Water from the Rock: Black Resistance in a Revolutionary Age. Princeton, NJ: Princeton University Press. ISBN 0-691-04784-7. Preview.
- Gallay, Alan. The Indian Slave Trade, 2002. Preview.
- Genovese, Eugene D. (1974). Roll, Jordan, Roll: The World the Slaves Made. New York: Pantheon Books. ISBN 0-394-49131-9.
- —— (1965). The Political Economy of Slavery: Studies in the Economy and the Society of the Slave South. New York: Vintage Books. Preview.
- —— and Elizabeth Fox-Genovese (1983). Fruits of Merchant Capital: Slavery and Bourgeois Property in the Rise and Expansion of Capitalism. New York: Oxford University Press. ISBN 0-19-503157-1. Preview.
- Harrold, Stanley. American Abolitionism: Its Direct Political Impact from Colonial Times into Reconstruction (U of Virginia Press, 2019) online.
- Hashaw, Tim (2007). The Birth of Black America: The First African Americans and the Pursuit of Freedom at Jamestown. New York: Carroll & Graf Publishers. ISBN 978-0-7867-1718-7. Preview.
- Higginbotham, A. Leon, Jr. In the Matter of Color: Race and the American Legal Process: The Colonial Period. Oxford University Press, 1978, ISBN 0-19-502745-0. Preview.
- Horton, James Oliver and Horton, Lois E. Slavery and the Making of America, 2005, ISBN 0-19-517903-X. Preview.
- Johnson, Walter (2013). River of Dark Dreams: Slavery and Empire in the Cotton Kingdom. Cambridge, MA: Belknap Press of Harvard University Press. ISBN 978-0-674-04555-2. Preview.
- Kaplan, Sidney (1973). The Black Presence in the Era of the American Revolution, 1770–1800. Greenwich, CT: New York Graphic Society. ISBN 0-8212-0541-2. Preview.
- Kolchin, Peter (1993). American Slavery: 1619–1877.
- Kolchin, Peter (1999) [1992]. American Slavery, 1619–1877. New York: Hill and Wang. ISBN 0-8090-1554-4. Preview.
- Litwack, Leon F. Been in the Storm So Long: The Aftermath of Slavery (1979), social history of how slavery ended in the Confederacy. Preview.
- —— (1961). North of Slavery: The Negro in the Free States, 1790–1860. Chicago: University of Chicago Press. Preview.
- Mason, Matthew. Slavery and Politics in the Early American Republic, 2006, ISBN 978-0-8078-3049-9.Preview.
- Miller, James, ed. (2001). The Complete History of American Slavery. San Diego, California: Greenhaven Press. ISBN 0737704241.
- Moon, Dannell, "Slavery", article in Encyclopedia of Rape, Merril D. Smith (Ed.), Greenwood Publishing Group, 2004.
- Moore, Wilbert Ellis, American Negro Slavery and Abolition: A Sociological Study, Ayer Publishing, 1980. Preview.
- Morgan, Edmund S. American Slavery, American Freedom: The Ordeal of Colonial Virginia , W.W. Norton, 1975. Preview.
- Morris, Thomas D. (1996). Southern Slavery and the Law, 1619–1860. Chapel Hill: University of North Carolina Press. ISBN 0-8078-4817-4. Preview.
- Oakes, James. The Ruling Race: A History of American Slaveholders, 1982, ISBN 0-393-31705-6. Preview.
- Palmer, Colin A., ed. (1998). The Worlds of Unfree Labour: From Indentured Servitude to Slavery. Brookfield, VT: Ashgate Publishing Company. ISBN 0-86078-515-7. Preview.
- Robinson, Donald L. (1970). Slavery in the Structure of American Politics, 1765–1820. New York: Harcourt Brace Jovanovich. ISBN 0-15-182972-1. Preview.
- Rodriguez, Junius P., ed. Encyclopedia of Emancipation and Abolition in the Transatlantic World, Armonk, NY: M.E. Sharpe, 2007.
- ——, ed. Encyclopedia of Slave Resistance and Rebellion, Greenwood Publishing Group, 2007.
- Scarborough, William K. The Overseer: Plantation Management in the Old South, 1984. Preview.
- Schermerhorn, Calvin. The Business of Slavery and the Rise of American Capitalism, 1815–1860, Yale University Press, 2015.
- Scott, Daryl Michael (2020). "The Social and Intellectual Origins of 13thism". Fire!!!. 5 (2): 2–39. JSTOR 10.5323/48573836.
- Snyder, Terri L. The Power to Die: Slavery and Suicide in British North America, University of Chicago Press, 2015.
- Stampp, Kenneth M. (1956). The Peculiar Institution: Slavery in the Ante-Bellum South. Preview.
- Tadman, Michael. Speculators and Slaves: Masters, Traders, and Slaves in the Old South, University of Wisconsin Press, 1989. Preview.
- Tannenbaum, Frank (1946). Slave and Citizen, the Negro in the Americas. New York: Alfred A. Knopf. Preview.
- United States Census Bureau. Negro Population in the United States, 1790–1915, New York: Arno Press, 1968. Preview
- Wiecek, William M. (1977). The Sources of Antislavery Constitutionalism in America, 1760–1848. Ithaca, NY: Cornell University Press. ISBN 0-8014-1089-4. Preview.
- Williams, Eric Eustace (1966). Capitalism and Slavery. New York: G.P. Putnam's Sons. Preview.
- Wright, W. D. Historians and Slavery; A Critical Analysis of Perspectives and Irony in American Slavery and Other Recent Works, Washington, D.C.: University Press of America, 1978.
- Yafa, Stephen (2006). Big Cotton. Viking Penguin. ISBN 0-670-03367-7. Republished as Cotton: The Biography of a Revolutionary Fiber (2006). Preview

==== Journal articles ====
- Cohen, William (1969). "Thomas Jefferson and the Problem of Slavery". The Journal of American History. 56 (3): 503–526. doi:10.2307/1904203. JSTOR 1904203.
- Cushing, John D. (1961). "The Cushing Court and the Abolition of Slavery in Massachusetts: More Notes on the 'Quock Walker Case'". The American Journal of Legal History. 5 (2): 118–144. doi:10.2307/844116. JSTOR 844116.
- David, Paul A.; Temin, Peter (1974). "Slavery: The progressive institution?". Journal of Economic History. 34 (3): 739–783. doi:10.1017/S0022050700079882.
- Finkelman, Paul (2001). "The Founders and Slavery: Little Ventured, Little Gained". Yale Journal of Law & the Humanities. 13 (2): 413–449. hdl:20.500.13051/7314. SSRN 1432083.
- Horton, James Oliver; Horton, Lois E. (2006). Slavery and the Making of America. Oxford University Press. ISBN 9780195304510.
- Lynd, Staughton (1963). "On Turner, Beard and Slavery". The Journal of Negro History. 48 (4): 235–250. doi:10.2307/2716327. JSTOR 2716327.
- Ransom, Roger L. (1974). "Was It Really All That Great to Be a Slave? A Review Essay". Agricultural History. 48 (4): 578–585. JSTOR 3741391.
- Ransom, Roger L. (1974). "Was It Really All That Great to Be a Slave? A Review Essay". Agricultural History. 48 (4): 578–585. JSTOR 3741391.
- Stampp, Kenneth M. (1970). "Interpreting the Slaveholders' World: A Review". Agricultural History. 44 (4): 407–412. JSTOR 3741525. ProQuest 1296026083.

==== Videos ====
- Hahn, Steven. The Greatest Slave Rebellion in Modern History: Southern Slaves in the American Civil War, Southern Spaces, 2004.

=== Slavery and the Constitution ===
- Foner, Eric. The Second Founding: How the Civil War and Reconstruction Remade the Constitution (W. W. Norton & Company, 2019).
- Goldstone, Lawrence (2005). Dark Bargain: Slavery, Profits, and the Struggle for the Constitution. New York: Walker & Company. ISBN 0-8027-1460-9. Preview.
- Drake, Charles E. (September 17, 1862). The War of Slavery upon the Constitution: Address of Charles E. Drake on the Anniversary of the Constitution Delivered in St. Louis. Preview.
- Goldwin, Robert A.; Kaufman, Art, eds. (1988). Slavery and Its Consequences: The Constitution, Equality, and Race. Washington, DC: American Enterprise Institute for Public Policy Research. ISBN 0-8447-3649-X.
- Kaminski, John P., ed. (1995). A Necessary Evil?: Slavery and the Debate over the Constitution. Madison, WI: Madison House. p. 256. ISBN 978-0945-61216-2.
- Oakes, James. The Crooked Path to Abolition: Abraham Lincoln and the Antislavery Constitution (W. W. Norton & Company, 2021).
- Van Cleve, George William. A Slaveholders' Union: Slavery, Politics, and the Constitution in the Early American Republic (University of Chicago Press, 2019). online
- Wilentz, Sean. No Property in Man: Slavery and Antislavery at the Nation's Founding (2nd ed. Harvard University Press, 2019).
- Williamson, Joel (1990). After Slavery: The Negro in South Carolina During Reconstruction, 1861–1877. Hanover, NH: University Press of New England. ISBN 0-8195-6236-X. Preview.

==== Journal articles ====
- David, C. W. A. (1924). "The Fugitive Slave Law of 1793 and its Antecedents". The Journal of Negro History. 9 (1): 18–25. doi:10.2307/2713433. JSTOR 2713433.
- Dougherty, Keith L.; Heckelman, Jac C. (September 2008). "Voting on slavery at the Constitutional Convention". Public Choice. 136 (3–4) 293. doi:10.1007/s11127-008-9297-7. JSTOR 40270762.
- Finkelman, P. (April 2011). "Slavery, the Constitution, and the Origins of the Civil War". OAH Magazine of History. 25 (2): 14–18. doi:10.1093/oahmag/oar004. JSTOR 23210240.
- —— (Winter 2000). "Garrison's Constitution: The Covenant with Death and How It Was Made". Prologue Magazine. 32 (4): 14–18. Preview.
- Freehling, William W. (1972). "The Founding Fathers and Slavery". The American Historical Review. 77 (1): 81–93. doi:10.2307/1856595. JSTOR 1856595.
- Knowles, Helen J. (August 2013). "Seeing the Light: Lysander Spooner's Increasingly Popular Constitutionalism". Law and History Review. 31 (3): 531–558. doi:10.1017/S0738248013000242. JSTOR 23489502.
- Maltz, Earl M. (1992). "Slavery, Federalism, and the Structure of the Constitution". The American Journal of Legal History. 36 (4): 466–498. doi:10.2307/845555. JSTOR 845555.
- Patterson, Orlando (1987). "The Unholy Trinity: Freedom, Slavery, and the American Constitution". Social Research. 54 (3): 543–577. JSTOR 40970472.

=== State and local studies ===
- Burke, Diane Mutti (2010). On Slavery's Border: Missouri's Small Slaveholding Households, 1815–1865. University of Georgia Press. ISBN 978-0-8203-3683-1. Preview.
- Fede, Andrew (1992). People Without Rights: An Interpretation of the Fundamentals of the Law of Slavery in the U.S. South. New York: Garland Publishing, Inc. ISBN 0-8153-0894-9. Preview.
- Fields, Barbara J. Slavery and Freedom on the Middle Ground: Maryland During the Nineteenth Century, Yale University Press, 1985. Preview.
- Freehling, Alice Goodyear (1982). Drift Toward Dissolution: The Virginia Slavery Debate of 1831–1832. Baton Rouge, LA: Louisiana State University Press. ISBN 0-8071-1035-3. Preview.
- Holton, Woody (1999). Forced Founders: Indians, Debtors, Slaves, and the Making of the American Revolution in Virginia. Chapel Hill: University of North Carolina Press (published for the Omohundro Institute of Early American History and Culture, Williamsburg, Virginia). ISBN 0-8078-2501-8. Preview.
- Jennison, Watson W. Cultivating Race: The Expansion of Slavery in Georgia, 1750–1860, University Press of Kentucky, 2012. Preview.
- Jewett, Clayton E. and John O. Allen; Slavery in the South: A State-By-State History Greenwood Press, 2004. Preview.
- Kulikoff, Alan. Tobacco and Slaves: The Development of Southern Cultures in the Chesapeake, 1680–1800 University of North Carolina Press, 1986. Preview.
- Minges, Patrick N.; Slavery in the Cherokee Nation: The Keetoowah Society and the Defining of a People, 1855–1867, 2003. Preview.
- Mohr, Clarence L. On the Threshold of Freedom: Masters and Slaves in Civil War Georgia University of Georgia Press, 1986. Preview.
- Mooney, Chase C. Slavery in Tennessee, Indiana University Press, 1957.
- Morgan, Edmund S. (1995) [1975]. American Slavery, American Freedom: The Ordeal of Colonial Virginia. New York: W.W. Norton & Company, Inc. ISBN 0-393-31288-7. Preview.
- Nash, Gary B. (1991). Freedom by Degrees: Emancipation in Pennsylvania and Its Aftermath. New York: Oxford University Press. ISBN 0-19-504583-1. Preview.
- Olwell, Robert. Masters, Slaves, & Subjects: The Culture of Power in the South Carolina Low Country, 1740–1790 Cornell University Press, 1998.
- Reidy, Joseph P. From Slavery to Agrarian Capitalism in the Cotton Plantation South, Central Georgia, 1800–1880 University of North Carolina Press, 1992. Preview.
- Ripley, C. Peter. Slaves and Freemen in Civil War Louisiana Louisiana State University Press, 1976.
- Rivers, Larry Eugene. Slavery in Florida: Territorial Days to Emancipation, University Press of Florida, 2000. Preview.
- Sellers, James Benson; Slavery in Alabama University of Alabama Press, 1950. Preview.
- Sydnor, Charles S. Slavery in Mississippi, 1933. Preview.
- Takagi, Midori. Rearing Wolves to Our Own Destruction: Slavery in Richmond, Virginia, 1782–1865 University Press of Virginia, 1999. Preview.
- Taylor, Joe Gray. Negro Slavery in Louisiana. Louisiana Historical Society, 1963. Preview.
- Trexler, Harrison Anthony. Slavery in Missouri, 1804–1865, Johns Hopkins University Press, 1914. Preview.
- Wood, Peter H. Black Majority: Negroes in Colonial South Carolina from 1670 through the Stono Rebellion W.W. Norton & Company, 1974. Preview.

==== Videos ====
- Jenkins, Gary (director). Negroes To Hire (Lifedocumentaries, 2010); 52 minutes DVD; on slavery in Missouri
- Gannon, James (October 25, 2018). A Moral Debt: The Legacy of Slavery in the USA. Al-Jazeera. Archived from the original on July 22, 2019. "Gannon is a descendant of Robert E. Lee"

=== Historiography and memory ===
- Ayers, E. L. (January 2006). "The American Civil War, Emancipation, and Reconstruction on the World Stage". OAH Magazine of History. 20 (1): 54–61. doi:10.1093/maghis/20.1.54.
- Berlin, Ira (2004). "American Slavery in History and Memory and the Search for Social Justice". The Journal of American History. 90 (4): 1251–1268. doi:10.2307/3660347. JSTOR 3660347.
- Boles, John B. and Evelyn T. Nolen, eds., Interpreting Southern History: Historiographical Essays in Honor of Sanford W. Higginbotham (1987). Preview.
- Brown, Vincent (2009). "Social Death and Political Life in the Study of Slavery". The American Historical Review. 114 (5): 1231–1249. doi:10.1086/ahr.114.5.1231. JSTOR 23303423. PMID 20217990. examined historical and sociological studies since the influential 1982 book Slavery and Social Death by American sociologist Orlando Patterson.
- Campbell, Gwyn (August 2006). "Children and slavery in the new world: A review". Slavery & Abolition. 27 (2): 261–285. doi:10.1080/01440390600765722.
- Collins, Bruce (1979). "American Slavery and Its Consequences". The Historical Journal. 22 (4): 997–1015. doi:10.1017/S0018246X00017246. JSTOR 2638699.
- Dirck, Brian (2007). "Changing Perspectives on Lincoln, Race, and Slavery". OAH Magazine of History. 21 (4): 9–12. doi:10.1093/maghis/21.4.9. JSTOR 25162137.
- Farrow, Anne; Lang, Joel; Frank, Jenifer. Complicity: How the North Promoted, Prolonged, and Profited from Slavery, Ballantine Books, 2006, ISBN 0-345-46783-3. Preview.
- Fogel, Robert W. The Slavery Debates, 1952–1990: A Retrospective, 2007.
- Ford, Lacy K. (2009). Deliver Us from Evil. The Slavery Question in the Old South. Oxford University Press. ISBN 978-0-19-511809-4. Preview.
- Fox-Amato, Matthew. Exposing Slavery: Photography, Human Bondage, and the Birth of Modern Visual Politics in America (Oxford University Press, 2019).
- Frey, Sylvia R. (March 2008). "The Visible Church: Historiography of African American Religion since Raboteau". Slavery & Abolition. 29 (1): 83–110. doi:10.1080/01440390701841083.
- Hahn, Steven (2003). A Nation under Our Feet: Black Political Struggles in the Rural South from Slavery to the Great Migration. Cambridge, Mass.: Harvard University Press. ISBN 9780674017658.
- Hettle, Wallace. "White Society in the Old South: The Literary Evidence Reconsidered", Southern Studies: An Interdisciplinary Journal of the South, Fall/Winter 2006, Vol. 13, Issue 3/4, pp. 29–44
- King, Richard H. (1977). "Marxism and the Slave South". American Quarterly. 29 (1): 117–131. doi:10.2307/2712264. JSTOR 2712264.
- Klarman, Michael J. (2016). Unfinished Business: Racial Equality in American History. New York: Oxford University Press. ISBN 978-0-19-994203-9. Preview
- Kolchin, Peter. "American Historians and Antebellum Southern Slavery, 1959–1984", in William J. Cooper, Michael F. Holt, and John McCardell, eds., A Master's Due: Essays in Honor of David Herbert Donald (1985), 87–111
- Laurie, Bruce (December 2008). "Workers, Abolitionists, and the Historians: A Historiographical Perspective". Labor. 5 (4): 17–55. doi:10.1215/15476715-2008-024.
- Meier, August; Rudwick, Elliott M. (1986). Black history and the historical profession, 1915–80.
- Neely, Mark E. (2009). "Lincoln, Slavery, and the Nation". The Journal of American History. 96 (2): 456–458. doi:10.1093/jahist/96.2.456. JSTOR 25622304.
- Parish; Peter J. Slavery: History and Historians Westview Press. 1989. Preview.
- Penningroth, Dylan (2009). "Writing Slavery's History". OAH Magazine of History. 23 (2): 13–20. doi:10.1093/maghis/23.2.13. JSTOR 40505983.
- Rael, Patrick. Eighty-Eight Years: The Long Death of Slavery in the United States, 1777–1865. Athens, GA: University of Georgia Press, 2015.
- Sidbury, James (2007). "Globalization, Creolization, and the Not-So-Peculiar Institution". The Journal of Southern History. 73 (3): 617–630. doi:10.2307/27649484. JSTOR 27649484.
- Stuckey, P. Sterling (2006). "Reflections on the Scholarship of African Origins and Influence in American Slavery". The Journal of African American History. 91 (4): 425–443. doi:10.1086/JAAHv91n4p425. JSTOR 20064125.
- Sweet, John Wood (2009). "The Subject of the Slave Trade: Recent Currents in the Histories of the Atlantic, Great Britain, and Western Africa". Early American Studies. 7 (1): 1–45. doi:10.1353/eam.0.0011. JSTOR 23546554.
- Tadman, Michael (September 2007). "The Reputation of the Slave Trader in Southern History and the Social Memory of the South". American Nineteenth Century History. 8 (3): 247–271. doi:10.1080/14664650701505117.
- Tulloch, Hugh. The Debate on the American Civil War Era (1998), ch. 2–4
- Wright, Robert E. (2010). Fubarnomics. Buffalo, N.Y.: Prometheus.

=== Primary sources ===
- Albert, Octavia V. Rogers. The House of Bondage Or Charlotte Brooks and Other Slaves. Oxford University Press, 1991. Primary sources with commentary. ISBN 0-19-506784-3
- An American (1855). Cotton is king: or, The culture of cotton, and its relation to Agriculture, Manufactures and Commerce; to the free colored people; and to those who hold that slavery is in itself sinful. Cincinnati: Moore, Wilstach, Keys.
- Basker, James G. (2002). Amazing Grace: An Anthology of Poems About Slavery, 1660–1810. New Haven, CT: Yale University Press. ISBN 0-300-09172-9. Preview.
- Berlin, Ira; Fields, Barbara J.; Miller, Steven F.; Reidy, Joseph P.; Rowland, Leslie S., eds. (1992). Free at Last: A Documentary History of Slavery, Freedom, and the Civil War. New York: The New Press. ISBN 1-56584-120-4. Preview.
- ——; Rowland, Leslie S., eds. (1997). Families and Freedom: A Documentary History of African-American Kinship in the Civil War Era. New York: The New Press. ISBN 1-56584-026-7. Preview.
- ——; Favreau, Marc; Miller, Steven F., eds. (1998). Remembering Slavery: African Americans Talk About Their Personal Experiences of Slavery and Emancipation. New York: The New Press.Preview.
- Blassingame, John W., ed., Slave Testimony: Two Centuries of Letters, Speeches, Interviews, and Autobiographies. Louisiana State University Press, 1977.
- Douglass, Frederick (2017) [1845]. Morris, Kenneth B. Jr. (ed.). Narrative of the Life of Frederick Douglass, an American Slave (Written by Himself). Atlanta, GA: Frederick Douglass Family Initiatives. ISBN 978-0-9984730-2-4. Preview.
- ——, "The Heroic Slave." Autographs for Freedom, Julia Griffiths, ed., Boston: John P. Jewett and Company, 1853. pp. 174–239. Available at the Documenting the American South website.
- ——, Collected Articles of Frederick Douglass, A Slave (Project Gutenberg)
- Missouri History Museum Archives Slavery Collection
- Morgan, Kenneth, ed. Slavery in America: a reader and guide (University of Georgia Press, 2005.)
- Rawick, George P., ed., The American Slave: A Composite Autobiography. 19 vols. Greenwood Publishing Company, 1972. Collection of WPA interviews made in the 1930s with ex-slaves

=== Scholarly books ===
- Andrews, William L. (2019) Slavery and Class in the American South: A Generation of Slave Narrative Testimony, 1840–1865 (Oxford University Press).
- Baptist, Edward E. (2014). The Half Has Never Been Told: Slavery and the Making of American Capitalism. Basic Books. ISBN 978-0-465-00296-2. Preview.
- Beckert, Sven (2014). Empire of Cotton: A Global History. Knopf Doubleday. ISBN 978-0-385-35325-0. Preview.
- Beckert, Sven; Rockman, Seth, eds. (2016). Slavery's Capitalism: A New History of American Economic Development. University of Pennsylvania Press. ISBN 978-0-8122-4841-8. Preview.
- Brady, Steven J. (2022) Chained to History: Slavery and US Foreign Relations to 1865 (Ithaca, NY: Cornell University Press). Online Reviews.
- Finkelman, Paul (1996). Slavery and the Founders: Race and Liberty in the Age of Jefferson. Armonk, NY: M.E. Sharpe. ISBN 978-1-56324-590-9. Preview.
- Finkelman, Paul, ed. (2002). Slavery & The Law. Lanham, MD: Rowman & Littlefield. ISBN 0-945612-36-2. Preview.
- Forret, Jeff (2015). New Directions in Slavery Studies: Commodification, Community, and Comparison. Louisiana State University Press. ISBN 978-0-8071-6115-9.
- Gellman, David Nathaniel. Emancipating New York: The politics of slavery and freedom, 1777–1827 (LSU Press, 2006) Online.
- Johnson, Walter (2013). River of Dark Dreams: Slavery and Empire in the Cotton Kingdom. Harvard University Press. ISBN 978-0-674-04555-2. Preview.
- Larson, Edward J. (2023) American Inheritance: Liberty and Slavery in the Birth of a Nation, 1765–1795 (W. W. Norton, 2023) Excerpt.
- Morgan, Kenneth O. (2000) Slavery and Servitude in North America, 1607–1800 (Edinburgh, Scotland: Edinburgh University Press). Preview.
- Parish, Peter J. (2022) Slavery: History and Historians (New York: Harper & Row). Preview.
- Reséndez, Andrés (2016). The Other Slavery: The Uncovered Story of Indian Enslavement in America. New York: Houghton Mifflin Harcourt. ISBN 978-0-544-94710-8.
- Schermerhorn, Calvin (2015). The Business of Slavery and the Rise of American Capitalism, 1815–1860. Yale University Press. ISBN 978-0-300-19200-1.
- Schwalm, Leslie A. (1997) A Hard Hight for We: Women's Transition from Slavery to Freedom in South Carolina (Chicago: University of Illinois Press). Preview.

=== Scholarly articles ===
- Baker, Regina S. (2022) "The historical racial regime and racial inequality in poverty in the American south." American Journal of Sociology 127.6 (2022): 1721–1781. online
- Hilt, Eric (2020). "Revisiting Time on the Cross After 45 Years: The Slavery Debates and the New Economic History". Capitalism: A Journal of History and Economics. 1 (2): 456–483. doi:10.1353/cap.2020.0000.
- Lindsey, Treva B.; Johnson, Jessica Marie (Fall 2014). "Searching for Climax: Black Erotic Lives in Slavery and Freedom". Meridians: Feminism, Race, Transnationalism. 12 (2): 169+.
- Logan, Trevon D. (May 2022). "American Enslavement and the Recovery of Black Economic History". Journal of Economic Perspectives. 36 (2): 81–98. doi:10.1257/jep.36.2.81.
- McCarthy, Thomas (December 2004). "Coming to Terms with Our Past, Part II: On the Morality and Politics of Reparations for Slavery". Political Theory. 32 (6): 750–772. doi:10.1177/0090591704268924.
- Naidu, Suresh (January 2, 2020). "American slavery and labour market power". Economic History of Developing Regions. 35 (1): 3–22. doi:10.1080/20780389.2020.1734312.
- Singleton, Theresa A. (1995). "The Archaeology of Slavery in North America". Annual Review of Anthropology. 24: 119–140. doi:10.1146/annurev.an.24.100195.001003.
- Turner, Edward Raymond (1912). "The First Abolition Society in the United States". Pennsylvania Magazine of History and Biography. 36: 92–109.

=== Oral histories and autobiographies of ex-slaves ===
- Andrews, William L.; Mason, Regina E., eds. (2008). Life of William Grimes, the Runaway Slave. Oxford University Press. ISBN 978-0-19-534331-1.
- Blight, David W. (2009). A Slave No More: Two Men Who Escaped to Freedom, Including Their Own Narratives of Emancipation. Boston and New York: Mariner Books, Houghton Mifflin Harcourt. ISBN 978-0-15-101-232-9.
- Goings, Henry (2012). Schermerhorn, Calvin; Plunkett, Michael; Gaynor, Edward (eds.). Rambles of a Runaway from Southern Slavery. University of Virginia Press. ISBN 978-0-8139-3240-8.
- Hurmence, Belinda, ed. (1989). Before Freedom When I Just Can Remember: Twenty-seven Oral Histories of Former South Carolina Slaves. Blair. ISBN 978-0-89587-069-8.
- Hurmence, Belinda, ed. (1990). Before Freedom: Forty-Eight Oral Histories of Former North & South Carolina Slaves. Mentor Books. ISBN 978-0-451-62781-0.
- Hurmence, Belinda, ed. (1990). My Folks Don't Want Me to Talk about Slavery: Twenty-One Oral Histories of Former North Carolina Slaves.
- Hurmence, Belinda, ed. (1997). Slavery Time When I Was Chillun. G. P. Putnam's Sons. ISBN 978-0-399-23194-0.
- Hurmence, Belinda, ed. (1994). We Lived in a Little Cabin in the Yard: Personal Accounts of Slavery in Virginia. Blair. ISBN 978-0-89587-118-3.
- Jacobs, Harriet (1861). Child, Lydia Maria (ed.). Incidents in the Life of a Slave Girl, Written by Herself. Thayer & Eldridge.
- Johnson, Clifton H. (1993). God Struck Me Dead: Voices of Ex-Slaves. Pilgrim Press. ISBN 978-0-8298-0945-9.

=== Bibliographies ===
- Miller, Joseph C. (1993). Slavery and Slaving in World History: A Bibliography, Volume I, 1900–1991. Millwood, NY: Kraus International Publications. ISBN 0-527-63660-6.
- —— (1999). Slavery and Slaving in World History: A Bibliography, Volume II, 1992–1996. Armonk, NY: M.E. Sharpe, Inc. ISBN 0-765-60279-2.

=== Discussions by foreigners ===
- Dickens, Charles (1913). "Slavery". American Notes for General Circulation. First published in 1842. See Louise H. Johnson, "The Source of the Chapter on Slavery in Dickens' American Notes", American Literature, vol. 14, Jan. 1943, pp. 427–430. London: Chapman & Hall.

=== Literary and cultural criticism ===
- Ryan, Tim A. Calls and Responses: The American Novel of Slavery Since Gone with the Wind. Baton Rouge: Louisiana State University Press, 2008.
- Van Deburg, William. Slavery and Race in American Popular Culture. Madison: University of Wisconsin Press, 1984.

=== Documentary films ===
- "Traces of the Trade". Traces of the Trade.
