= American slave trade =

American slave trade may refer to:

- Transatlantic slave trade to the Americas
- Illegal transatlantic slave trading following the Act Prohibiting Importation of Slaves (see Category:Post-1808 importation of slaves to the United States)
- Coastwise slave trade
- Slave trade in the United States, any intrastate or interstate commerce in slaves prior to 1865

== See also ==
- List of American slave traders
