= Slave act =

Slave Act may refer to:

- Fugitive Slave Act of 1793, a law passed by the United States Congress
- Slave Trade Act of 1794, a law passed by the United States Congress
- Slave Trade Act 1807, an Act of Parliament in the United Kingdom
- Act Prohibiting Importation of Slaves, a United States federal law from 1807
- Slave Compensation Act 1837, an Act of Parliament in the United Kingdom
- Fugitive Slave Act of 1850, a law passed by the United States Congress

== See also ==
- Slave Trade Act
