= The Emily and the Caroline =

US Supreme Court case on anti-circumvention principle in statutory interpretation

- Supreme Court of the United States

Argued February 7, 1824 Decided February 24, 1824
- Full case name: The Emily and the Caroline
- Citations: 22 U.S. 381 (more)

Court membership
- Chief Justice John Marshall Associate Justices Bushrod Washington · William Johnson; Thomas Todd · Gabriel Duvall; Joseph Story · Smith Thompson

Case opinion
- Majority: Thompson, joined by unanimous

Laws applied
- Slave Trade Act of 1794 and Act Prohibiting Importation of Slaves

The Emily and the Caroline, 22 U.S. 381 (1824), is a United States Supreme Court case in which the Court held that in admiralty law, indictments require less formality and technical precision than common law indictments. Additionally, the Supreme Court expressed an anti-circumvention principle for statutory interpretation, in which laws should be read in ways that do not undermine their purpose.

== Background ==
The Slave Trade Act of 1794 prohibited the preparation of ships for use in the slave trade and allowed the federal government to seize ships that violated this act. In this case, the US District Court for South Carolina and Circuit Court ordered the seizure of the ship Emily and brig Caroline because they were being fitted for the slave trade in the Port of Charleston.

== Supreme Court ==
Following oral arguments held on February 7, 1824, the Supreme Court issued its ruling on February 24. In a unanimous opinion, Associate Justice Smith Thompson affirmed the lower courts' judgement. Thompson rejected the ship owners' argument that the "libel of information", the historical term for an indictment in United States admiralty law, should have clarified whether they were instead being charged under the 1807 Act Prohibiting Importation of Slaves because both versions of the law criminalized their conduct. In the Supreme Court's view, "in admiralty proceedings, a libel in the nature of an information, does not require all the formality and technical precision of an indictment at common law."

Additionally, the Supreme Court rejected the defense that the ships were seized before they were completely fitted and ready for sea, adopting an anti-circumvention principle for statutory interpretation that rejects readings that would undermine the law's purpose. As long as ships had begun preparations that indicated their use in the slave trade while docked at an American port, they could be seized by the federal government.

== Legacy ==
In 2024, the US Department of Justice and Associate Justice Sonia Sotomayor referenced this decision in the cases Garland v. Cargill and Garland v. VanDerStok to argue that the Gun Control Act of 1968 should not be interpreted in ways that undermine its purpose of regulating the sale of firearms.
