= Hope (1764 ship) =

American brig or sloop

History

United States
- Name: Hope

General characteristics
- Class & type: Brig, or sloop
- Tons burthen: 146 (bm)
- Propulsion: Sail

Hope was an American brig or sloop that made two voyages in the slave trade.

== Slave-trading voyages ==
Sailing out of Newport, Rhode Island Hope was involved in bringing Africans to the United States to be sold as slaves as part of the Middle Passage. Hope was under the command of Captain Nathaniel Mumford, when she sailed from Newport, Rhode Island, on 12 November 1764, bound for Senegambia and the offshore Atlantic islands. She arrived there in January 1765 and proceeded to purchase slaves at the Gambia.

On March 17, 1765, a revolt occurred on the ship:

There was a passenger revolt aboard the brigantine Hope while it was bringing slaves from the coast of Senegal and Gambia to Connecticut. How did that happen? –Well, the captain, who had beaten several of his crewmen, had been killed and his body thrown overboard, and so the black cargo, seeing such discord among their captors, figured they maybe had a chance. In their revolt they killed one crew member and wounded several others. On this day their revolt was suppressed by killing seven of them. (Note: The Trans-Atlantic Slave Trade Database does not confirm Mumford's death as it has him sailing Hope on a second voyage later in 1765.)

Hope had embarked 83 slaves and she landed 18 at Barbados in June. She then sailed to Newport where she arrived on 5 December. There she landed another 51. In all, she landed 69 out of 83 slaves, for a loss rate of 16.9%.

Captain Mumford sailed Hope from Rhode Island on 2 June 1766. she arrived at Cape Coast Castle on 22 October and purchased 100 slaves there. She left on 22 November, and arrived back at Rhode Island on 2 February 1767. There she landed 95 slaves, for a loss rate of 5%. Another account has her landing 100 slaves to Rhode Island.

== Revolutionary War ==
During America's War for Independence, Hope was used for several purposes. In 1780 a ship named Hope was used as a hospital prison ship by the British. It was also used to ship British Loyalists to New Brunswick.

== Later voyages ==
In August 1795, merchant John Brown of Providence, Rhode Island conspired to trade in slaves with Captain Peleg Wood. Hope was the ship to be used; however, the United States had recently limited participation in the international slave trade by Congressional action in 1794. By November Hope was engaged in the slave trade again. Next in March 1796, the owners of the ship were fined by Rhode Island the amount of £200 for trading in slaves, which had been outlawed in that state. Then on October 5, 1797, Brown became the first American tried in federal court under the Slave Trade Act of 1794 for using Hope in the African slave trade. On that voyage in 1796 the Hope had traveled to Havana, Cuba, with 229 slaves.

After the forced sale, during the Quasi-War with France, Hope was captured by French privateers. At this time the vessel was under the command of John Rodgers, who had served on board the USS Constellation, and was owned by Baltimore merchant James Buchanan. After capture the Hope, which had been transporting tobacco, was sold at Lorient in February 1797.
