= Slave trade in the United States =

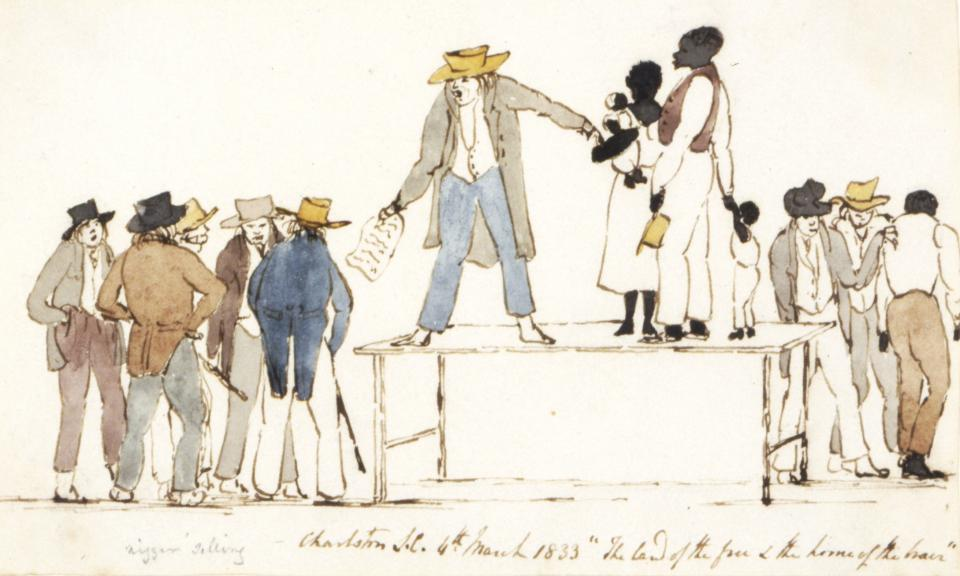
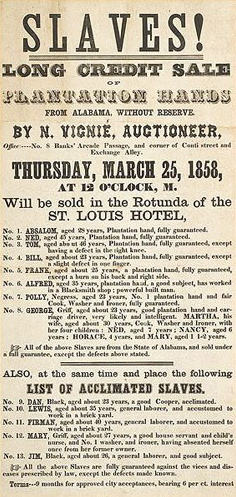
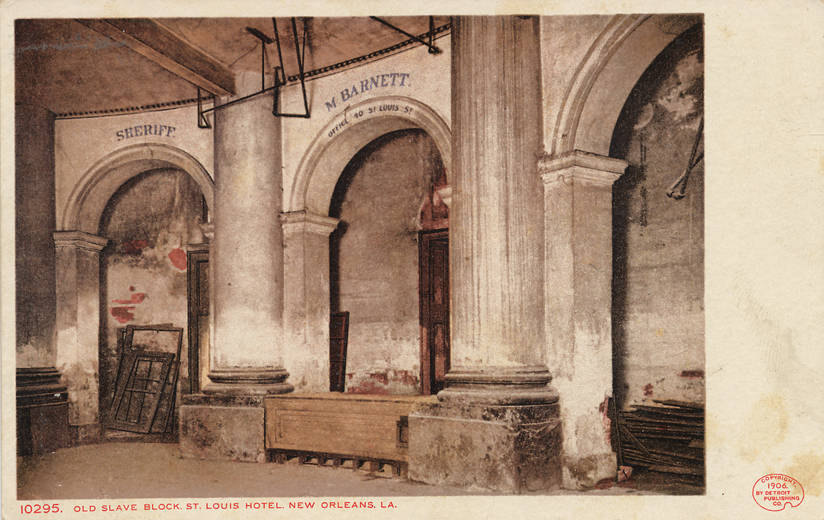
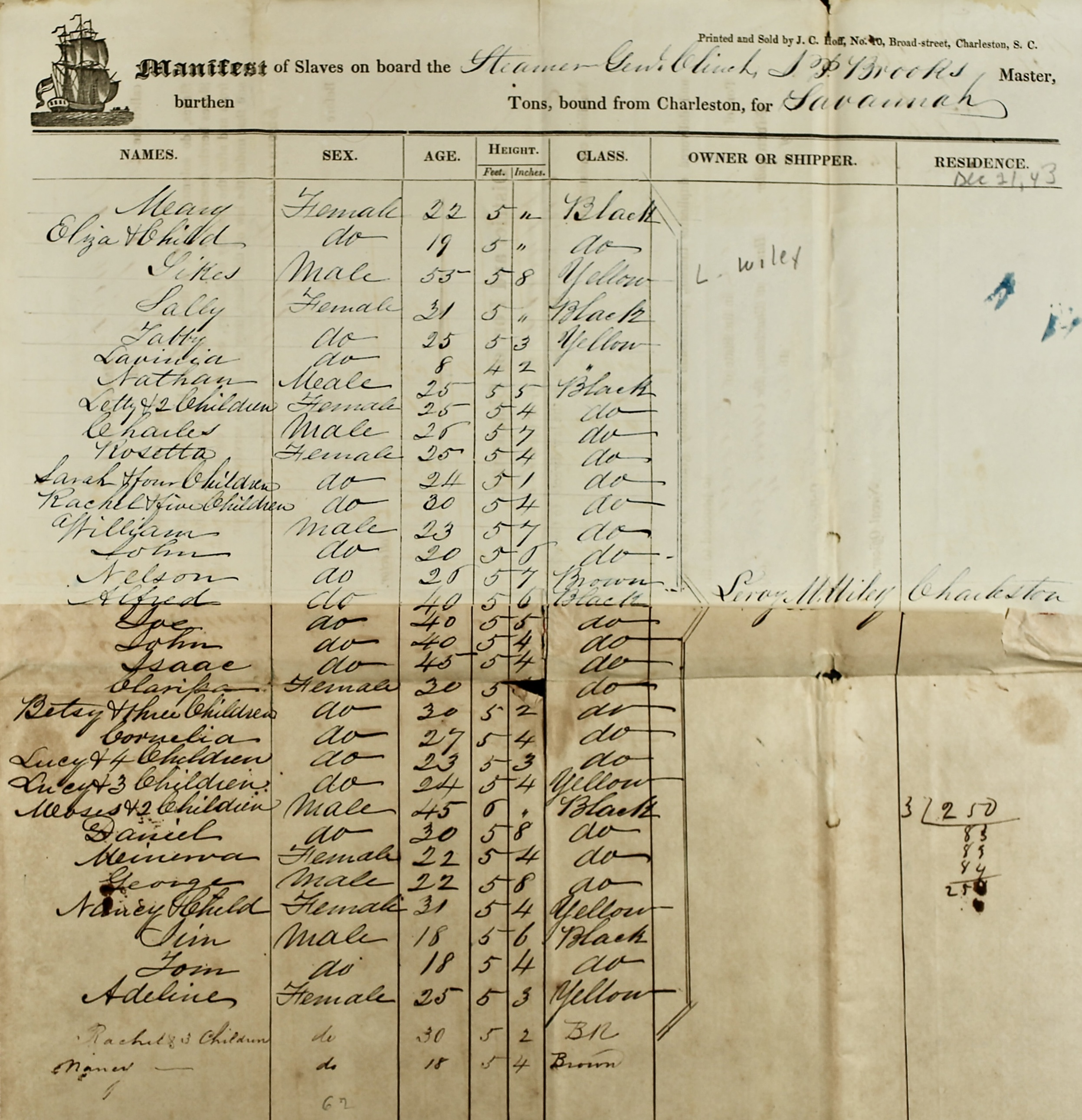
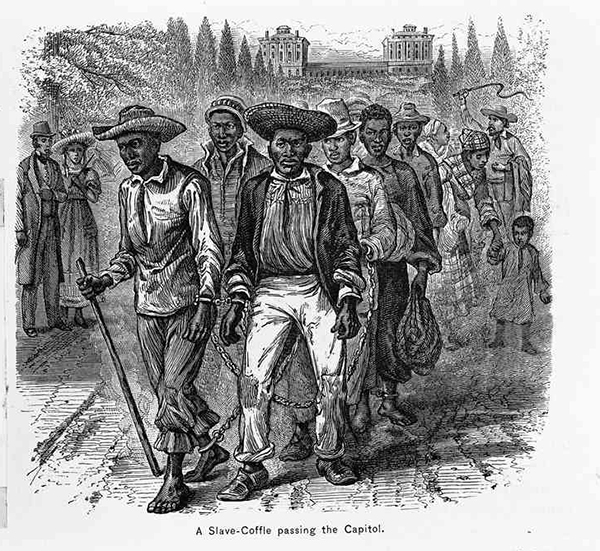
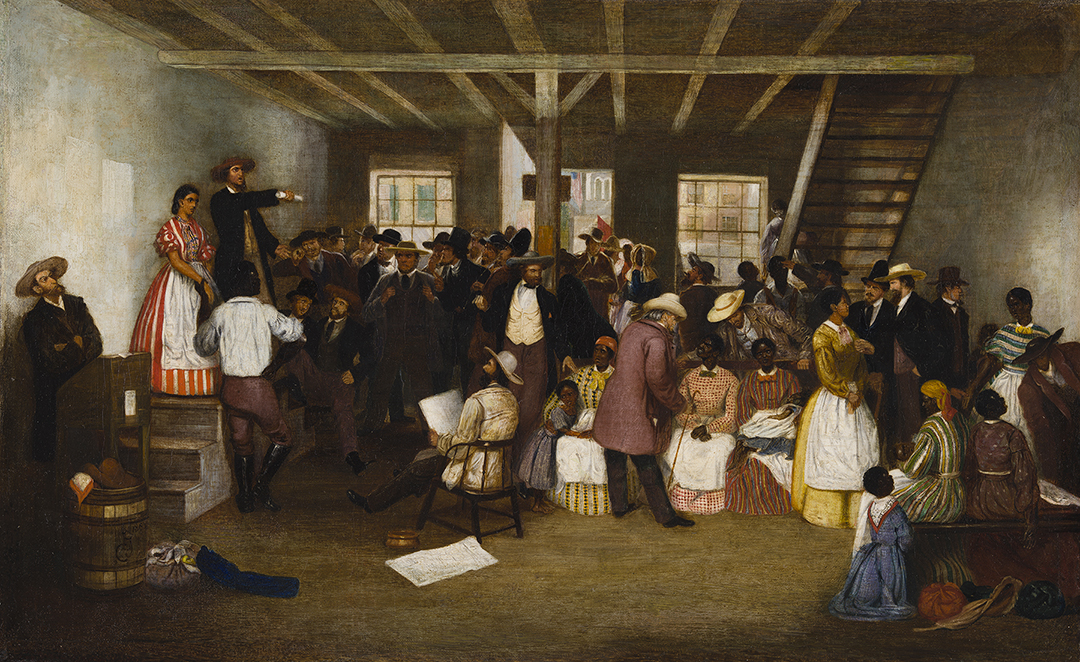
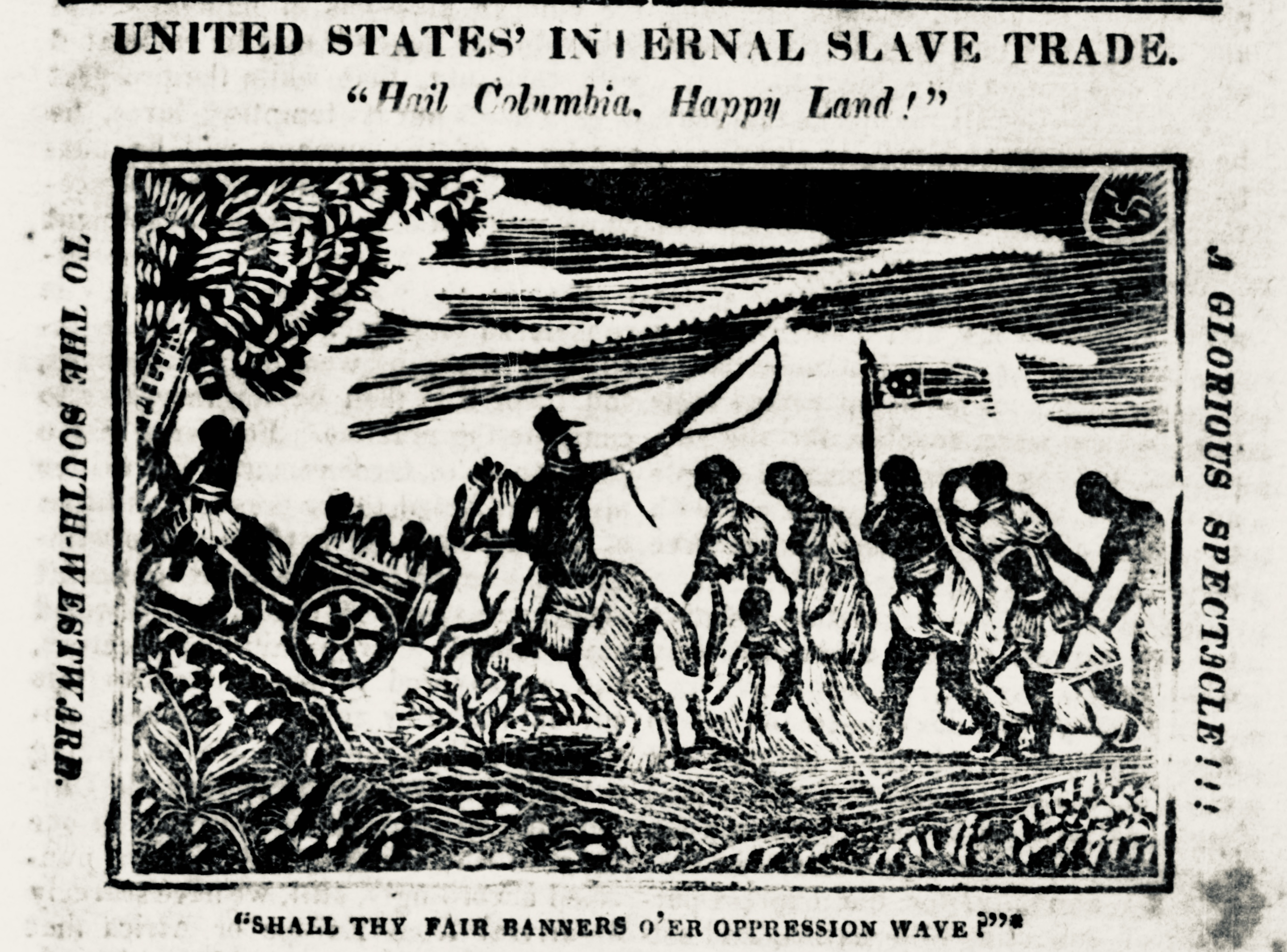
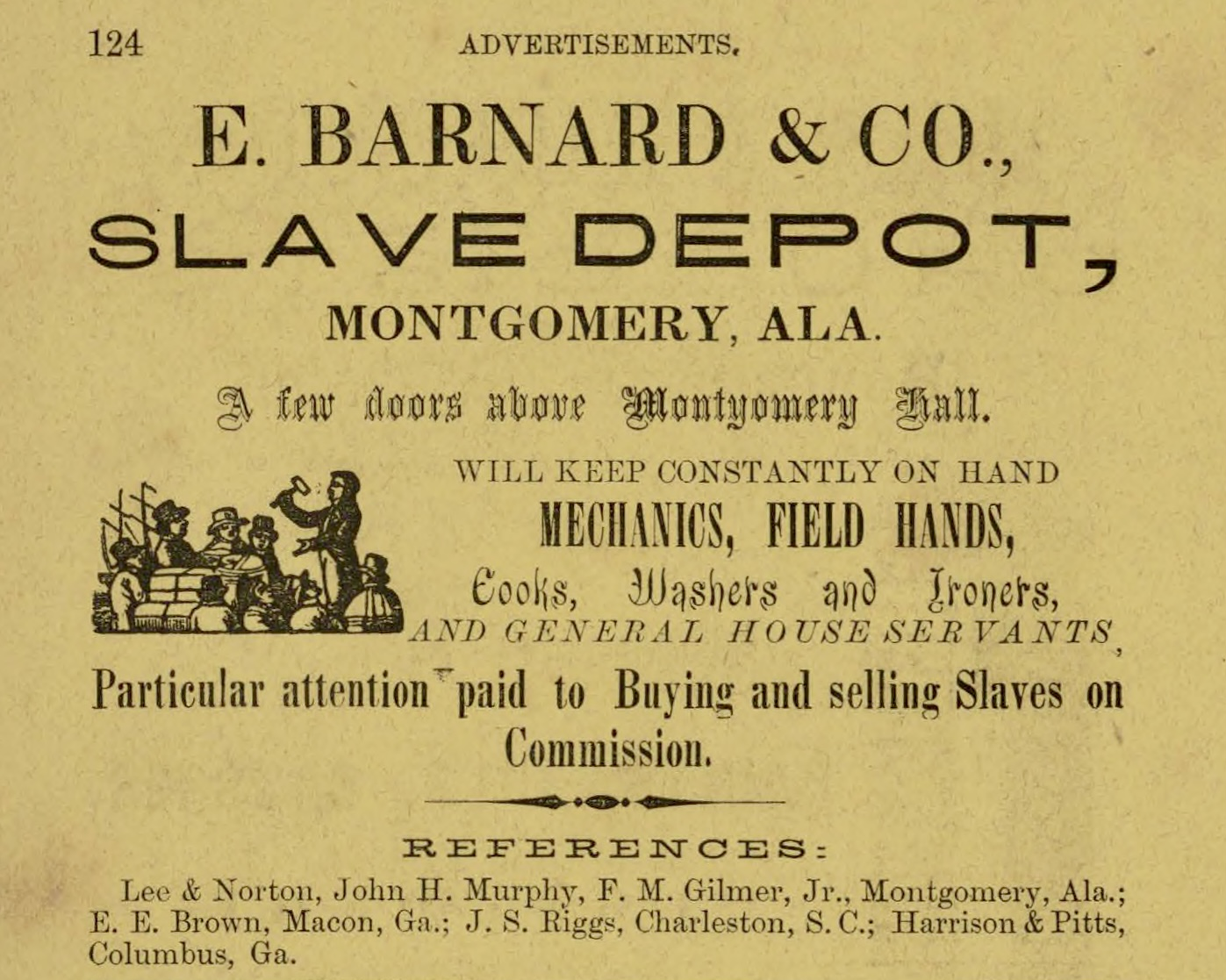
(1) Charleston S.C. 4th March 1833 The land of the free & home of the brave watercolor by British naval officer Henry Byam Martin; (2a) Broadside advertising sale of slaves in the rotunda of the St. Louis Hotel in New Orleans (1858), and (2b) postcard depicting the "Old Slave Block" at the St. Louis Hotel in New Orleans (c. 1900); (3a) Manifest of coastwise slave ship from Charleston to Savannah (1843), and (3c) a coffle passing the U.S. Capitol under construction (1825); (4) Richmond Slave Market Auction oil painting by British artist Lefevre James Cranstone (1862); (5a) slaves marching through Kentucky under the American flag, and (5b) 1859 ad for a Montgomery, Alabama slave depot

The internal slave trade in the United States, also known as the domestic slave trade, the Second Middle Passage and the interregional slave trade, was the mercantile trade of enslaved people within the United States. It was most significant after 1808, when the importation of slaves from Africa was prohibited by federal law. Historians estimate that upwards of one million slaves were forcibly relocated from the Upper South, places like Maryland, Virginia, Kentucky, North Carolina, Tennessee, and Missouri, to the territories and states of the Deep South, especially Georgia, Alabama, Louisiana, Mississippi, Arkansas, and Texas.

Economists say that transactions in the inter-regional slave market were driven primarily by differences in the marginal productivity of labor, which were based in the relative advantage between climates for the production of staple goods. The trade was strongly influenced by the invention of the cotton gin, which made short-staple cotton profitable for cultivation across large swathes of the upland Deep South (the Black Belt). Previously the commodity was based on long-staple cotton cultivated in coastal areas and the Sea Islands.

The disparity in productivity created arbitrage opportunities for traders to exploit, and it facilitated regional specialization in labor production. Due to a lack of data, particularly with regard to slave prices, land values, and export totals for slaves, the true effects of the domestic slave trade, on both the economy of the Old South and general migration patterns of slaves into southwest territories, remain uncertain. These have served as points of contention among economic historians. The physical effect of forced labor (on remote plantation camps plagued with yellow fever, cholera, and malaria), and social-emotional effect of family separation in American slavery, was profound.

== History ==
The history of the domestic slave trade can very clumsily be divided into three major periods:

- 1776 to 1808: This period began with the Declaration of Independence and ended when the importation of slaves from Africa and the Caribbean was prohibited under federal law in 1808; the importation of slaves was prohibited by the Continental Congress during the American Revolutionary War but resumed locally afterwards, primarily through the ports of Wilmington, North Carolina (until 1785), Savannah, Georgia (until 1798), and Charleston, South Carolina (reopened the transatlantic slave trade in December 1803 and imported 39,075 enslaved people of African descent between 1804 and 1808). Some slaves shipped to these ports were resold locally, others were forwarded on the Natchez and New Orleans slave markets of the lower Mississippi.
- 1808 to Indian removal and invention of long-staple cotton gin (1830s): This period of national expansion can arguably be backdated to the Louisiana Purchase of 1803, and includes the cession of Spanish West Florida in 1821. In the years immediately following the War of 1812, the most active slave markets in the deep South were at Algiers, Louisiana, and Natchez, Mississippi. One New Orleans historian found evidence of that the "queen of the trade", as New Orleans was later known, was open for business in the first years of the 19th century, but "it was not till the 1820s had well set in that the number of American slave merchants grew to impressive proportions" and by 1827 "New Orleans had become the chief center of the slave trade in the lower South".

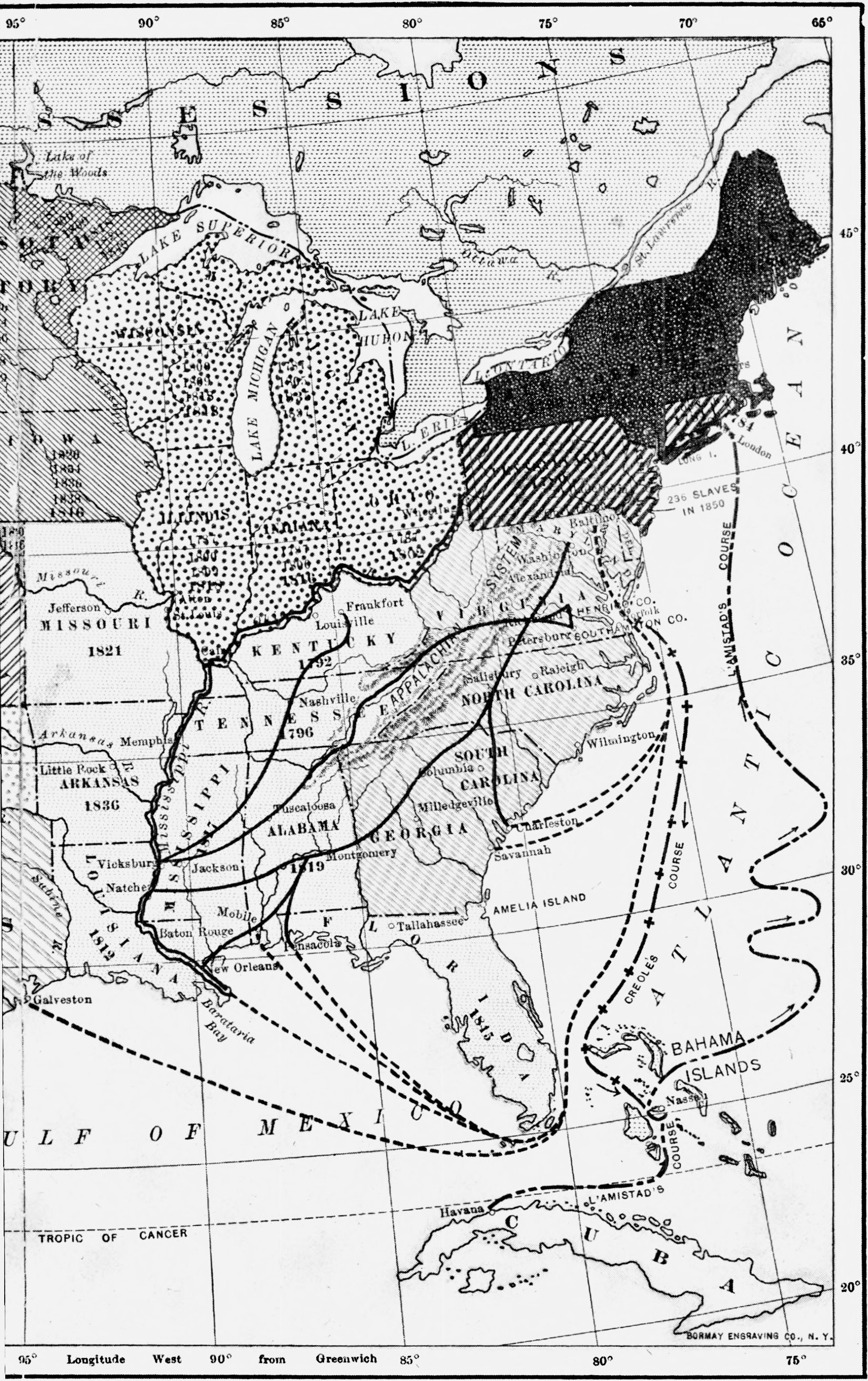
Historical map of the slave trade in the United States from 1830 to 1850, showing overland and sea routes (Map: Albert Bushnell Hart, 1906)

- 1830s to American Civil War: This period began when the combination of new lands open for settlement and higher profits for cotton growers led to a massive population transfer of enslaved people from the Chesapeake region to the Mississippi River basin. This era also saw the rise of the ever-more vocal and organized abolitionist movement in the United States, as chronicled and publicized by journals like The Liberator, which was established in 1831.

=== End of the slave trade ===
The domestic slave trade wilted during American Civil War—there was a measurable price drop between 1860 and 1862, due to "market uncertainty" discouraging speculators. In May 1861, a "Southern Mississippian" who seemed to oppose secession even though "no man in Mississippi has a larger proportion of his property in negroes" wrote the Louisville Courier that "The secessionists are carrying out the principles and wishes of the abolitionists. Likely negroes could not be sold here at $500 in good money. Negro traders are as scarce here as in Boston." Still, the business remained brisk and prices rose in the protected interior of the CSA, and according to historian Robert Colby, "Confederates nevertheless interpreted the health of the slave trade as embodying that of their nation."

Times got still harder for traders when the Union blockade and total U.S. military control of the Mississippi River prevented the trafficking of people from, say, rural Missouri to New Orleans. But the slave trade, as an integral part of slavery, persisted throughout Confederate-controlled territory until very nearly the end of the war. Ziba B. Oakes was still listing slaves in Charleston newspaper ads in November 1864. A handful of American-flagged ships were still moving enslaved people from Africa to Cuba and Brazil until 1867, when American participation in the slave trade ended once and for all.

== Economics ==
Slavery was a massive element of the U.S. national economy and even more so the economy of the South: "In 1860, enslaved people were worth more than $3 billion (~$87.5 billion in 2025) to their owners. In today's economy, that would be equivalent to $12.1 trillion or 67 percent of the 2015 U.S. gross domestic product...The unpaid fruits of their labors created an interest so strong that between 1861 and 1865, Confederate leaders staked hundreds of thousands of lives and the future of their civilization on it." As told by historian Frederic Bancroft, "Slave trading was considered a sign of enterprise and prosperity."

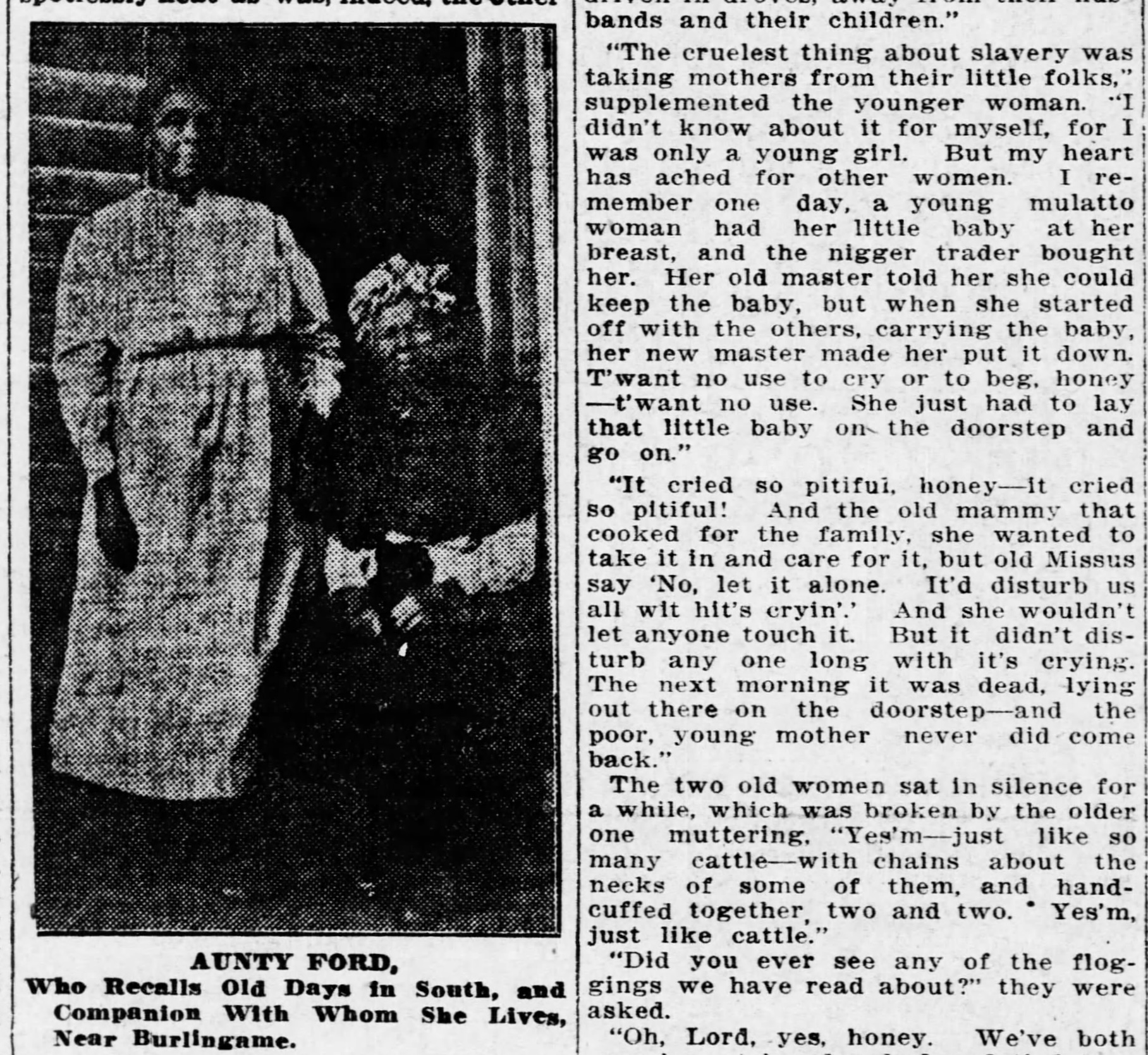
When interviewed in 1913 by Myra Williams Jarrell for the Topeka Star, Emily Ford and Mary Shawn of Burlingame, Kansas, recalled an instance of family separation in American slavery due to the slave trade

The internal slave trade among colonies emerged in 1760 as a source of labor in early America. It is estimated that between 1790 and 1860 approximately 835,000 slaves were relocated to the American South.

The biggest sources for the domestic slave trade were "exporting" states in the Upper South, especially Virginia and Maryland, and as well as Kentucky, North Carolina, Tennessee, and Missouri. From these states most slaves were imported into the Deep South, to the "slave-consuming states," especially Georgia, Alabama, Mississippi, and Louisiana. Robert Fogel and Stanley Engerman attribute the larger proportion of the slave migration due to planters who relocated their entire slave populations to the Deep South to develop new plantations or take over existing ones. Walter Johnson disagrees, finding that only one-third of the population movement south was due to wholesale relocation of slave owner and chattel, while the other two-thirds of the shift was due to the commerce in slaves.

=== Contributing factors ===
==== Soil exhaustion and crop changes ====
Historians who argue in favor of soil exhaustion as an explanation for slave importation into the Deep South posit that exporting states emerged as slave producers because of the transformation of agriculture in the Upper South. By the late 18th century, the coastal and Piedmont tobacco areas were being converted to mixed crops because of soil exhaustion and changing markets. Because of the deterioration of soil and an increase in demand for food products, states in the upper South shifted crop emphasis from tobacco to grain, which required less labor. This decreased demand left states in the Upper South with an excess supply of labor.

==== Land availability from Indian removal ====
With the forced Indian removal by the US making new lands available in the Deep South, there was much higher demand there for workers to cultivate the labor-intensive sugar cane and cotton crops. The extensive development of cotton plantations created the highest demand for labor in the Deep South.

==== Cotton gin ====
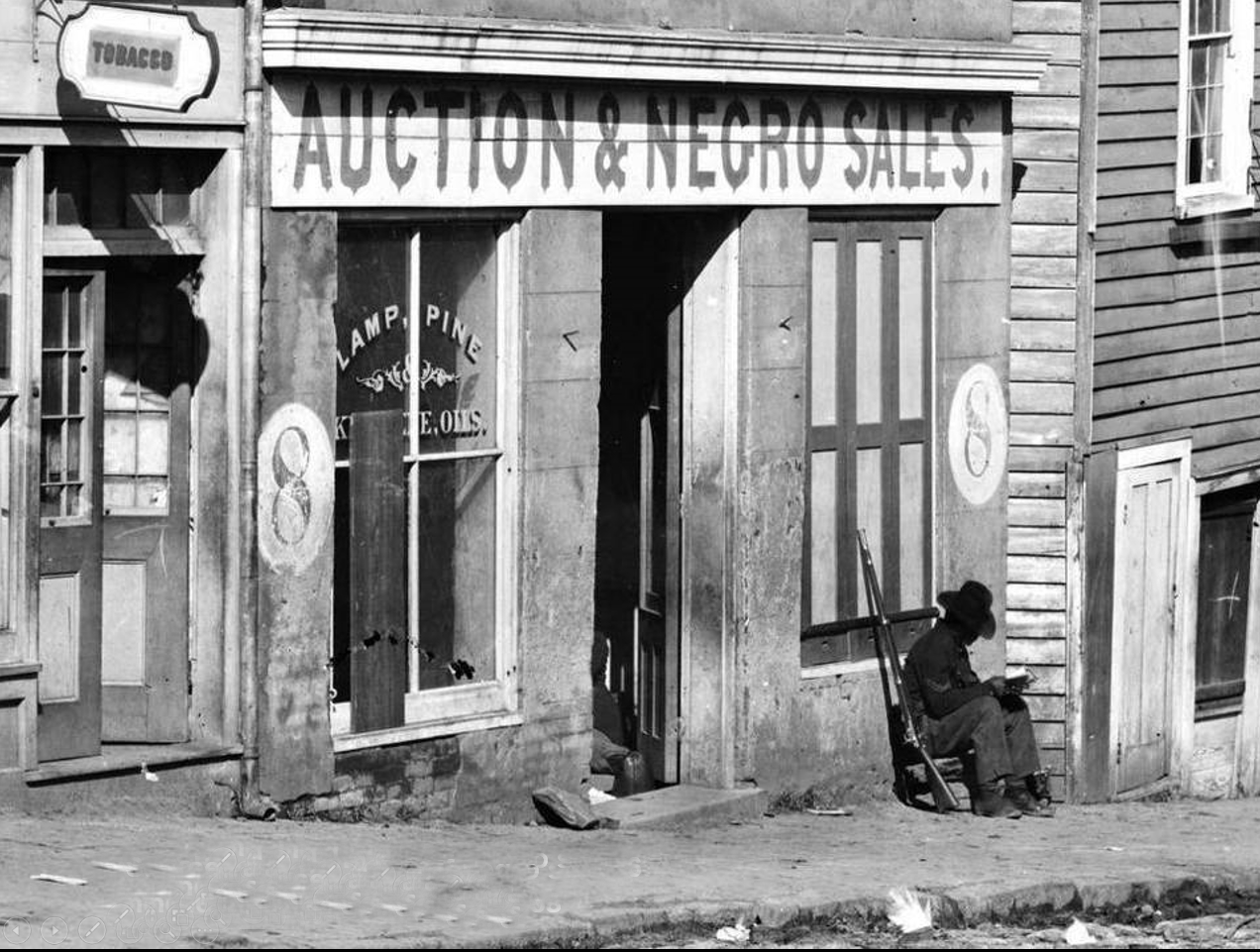
"AUCTION & NEGRO SALES": Black man in Union uniform reading in front of the Crawford, Frazer & Co. slave market at 8 Whitehall Street, photographed by George N. Barnard during the Atlanta campaign, 1864 (Library of Congress Digital)

At the same time, the invention of the cotton gin in the late 18th century transformed short-staple cotton into a profitable crop that could be grown inland in the Deep South. Settlers pushed into the South, expelling the Five Civilized Tribes and other Native American groups. The cotton market had previously been dominated by the long-staple cotton cultivated primarily on the Sea Islands and in the coastal South Carolina Lowcountry. The consequent boom in the cotton industry, coupled with the labor-intensive nature of the crop, created a need for slave labor in the Deep South that could be satisfied by excess supply further north.

The increased demand for labor in the Deep South pushed up the price of slaves in markets such as New Orleans, which became the fourth-largest city in the country based in part on profits from the slave trade and related businesses. The price differences between the Upper and Deep South created demand. Slave traders took advantage of this arbitrage opportunity by buying at lower prices in the Upper South and then selling slaves at a profit after taking or transporting them further south. Some scholars believe there was an increasing prevalence in the Upper South of "breeding" slaves for export. The proven reproductive capacity of enslaved women was advertised as selling point and a feature that increased value.

==== Resolve financial deficits ====
Although not as significant as the exportation of slaves to Deep South, farmers and land owners who needed to pay off loans increasingly used slaves as a cash substitute. This had also contributed to the growth of the internal slave trade.

=== Statistics ===
Economic historians have offered estimates for the annual revenue generated by the inter-regional slave trade for exporters that range from $3.75 to $6.7 million.

The demand for prime-aged slaves, from the ages of 15 to 30, accounted for 70 percent of the slave population relocated to the Deep South. Since the ages of slaves were often unknown by the traders themselves, physical attributes such as height often dictated demand in order to minimize asymmetric information.

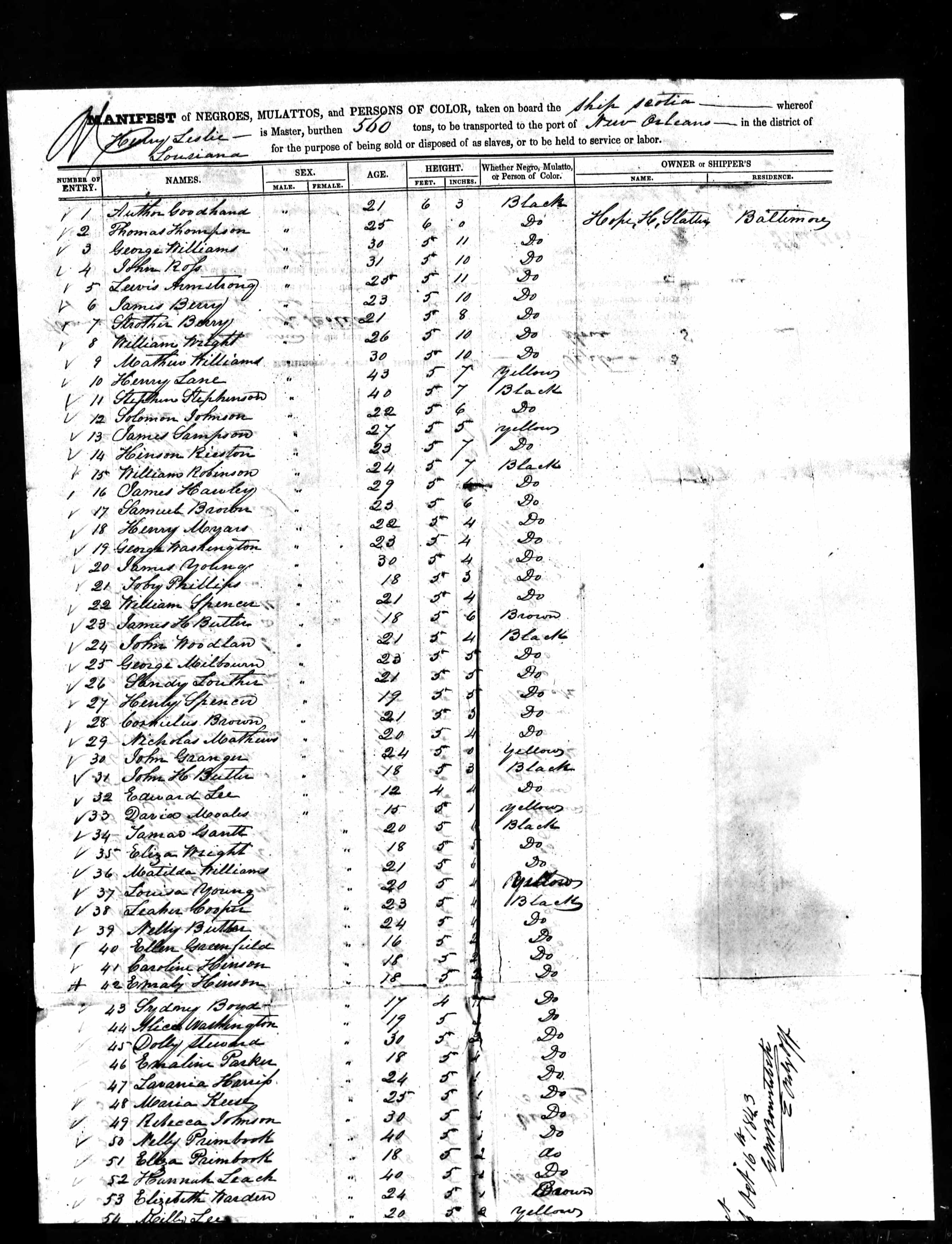
Partial manifest of a coastwise slave shipment made from Baltimore to New Orleans, by Hope H. Slatter, on the ship Scotia, September 1843

Robert Fogel and Stanley Engerman estimated that the slave trade accounted for 16 percent of the relocation of enslaved African Americans, in their work Time on the Cross. This estimate, however, was severely criticized for the extreme sensitivity of the linear function used to gather this approximation. A more recent estimate, given by Jonathan B. Pritchett, has this figure at about 50 percent, or about 835,000 slaves total between 1790 and 1850. Without the inter-regional slave trade, it is possible that forced migration of slaves would have occurred naturally due to natural population pressures and the subsequent increase in land prices. In 1965, William L. Miller contended that, "it is even doubtful whether the interstate slave traffic made a net contribution to the westward flow of the population." Historian Charles S. Sydnor wrote in 1933, "The number of slaves brought into Mississippi either by slavetraders or by immigrant masters cannot be precisely stated." Robert Gudmestad found that "Disentangling the various strands of forced migration is like trying to untie the Gordian knot. Migration with owners, planter purchase, and the interstate trade blended together to form a seamless whole."

=== Importation, piracy, and interstate kidnapping ===
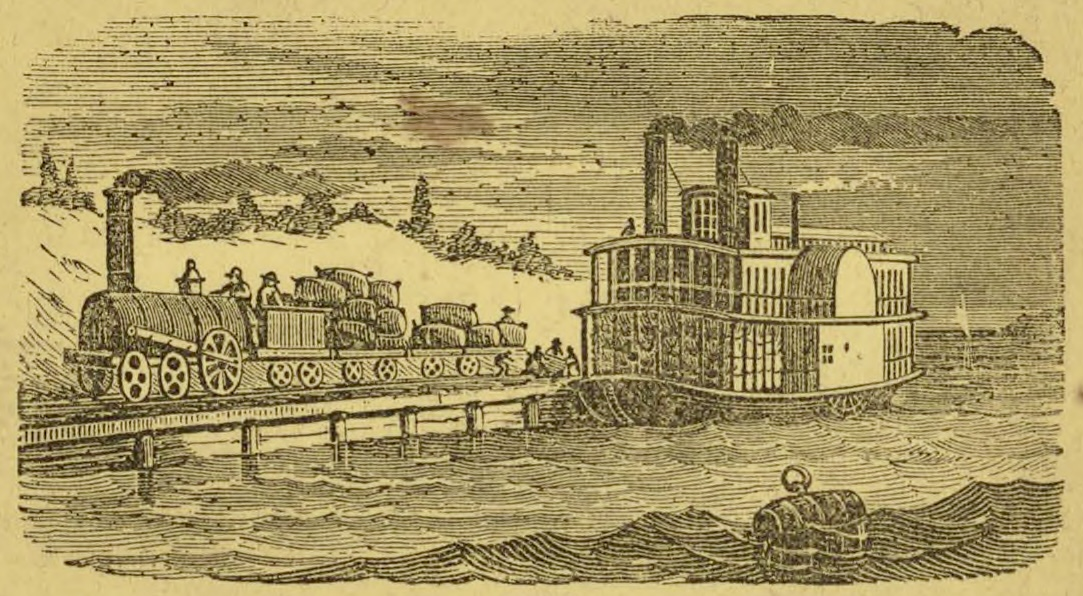
Commerce and transportation in Montgomery, Alabama, 1859

The transatlantic slave trade was not prohibited under federal law until 1808. Imports from Africa to Southern states were ongoing from 1776 until that time, most often through the ports of Charleston and Savannah. Imports to Cuba, Brazil, and America often involved similar personnel and practices. Post-1808 importation of slaves to the United States from the Caribbean, South America, and Africa was illegal but piracy continued until the opening of the American Civil War. Piracy was most active in the 1810s, with New Orleans and Amelia Island off Spanish Florida being key centers, and in the 1850s, when pro-slavery activists sought to drive down slave prices by illegally importing directly from Africa.

Kidnapping into slavery in the United States was an ongoing issue. Unaccompanied children and people of color traveling to port cities and border states were particularly vulnerable. There are multiple accounts of armed gangs breaking into the homes of free people in the dead of night and carrying away whole families. The lucky ones were sometimes redeemed from the local slave jail by friends or lawyers before they were shipped south.

=== Breeding of slave children for sale ===
According to Frederic Bancroft in Slave-Trading in the Old South (1931) young female slaves were also considered an excellent financial investment: "Not only real estate, but also stocks, bonds and all other personal property were little prized in comparison with slaves .... Absurd as it now seems, slaves, especially girls and young women, because of prospective increase, were considered the best investment for persons of small means."

=== Profits ===
Irish economic theorist John Elliot Cairnes suggested in his work The Slave Power that the inter-regional slave trade was a major component in ensuring the economic vitality of the Old South. Many economic historians, however, have since refuted the validity of this point. The general consensus seems to support Professor William L. Miller's claim that the inter-regional slave trade "did not provide the major part of the income of planters in the older states during any period."

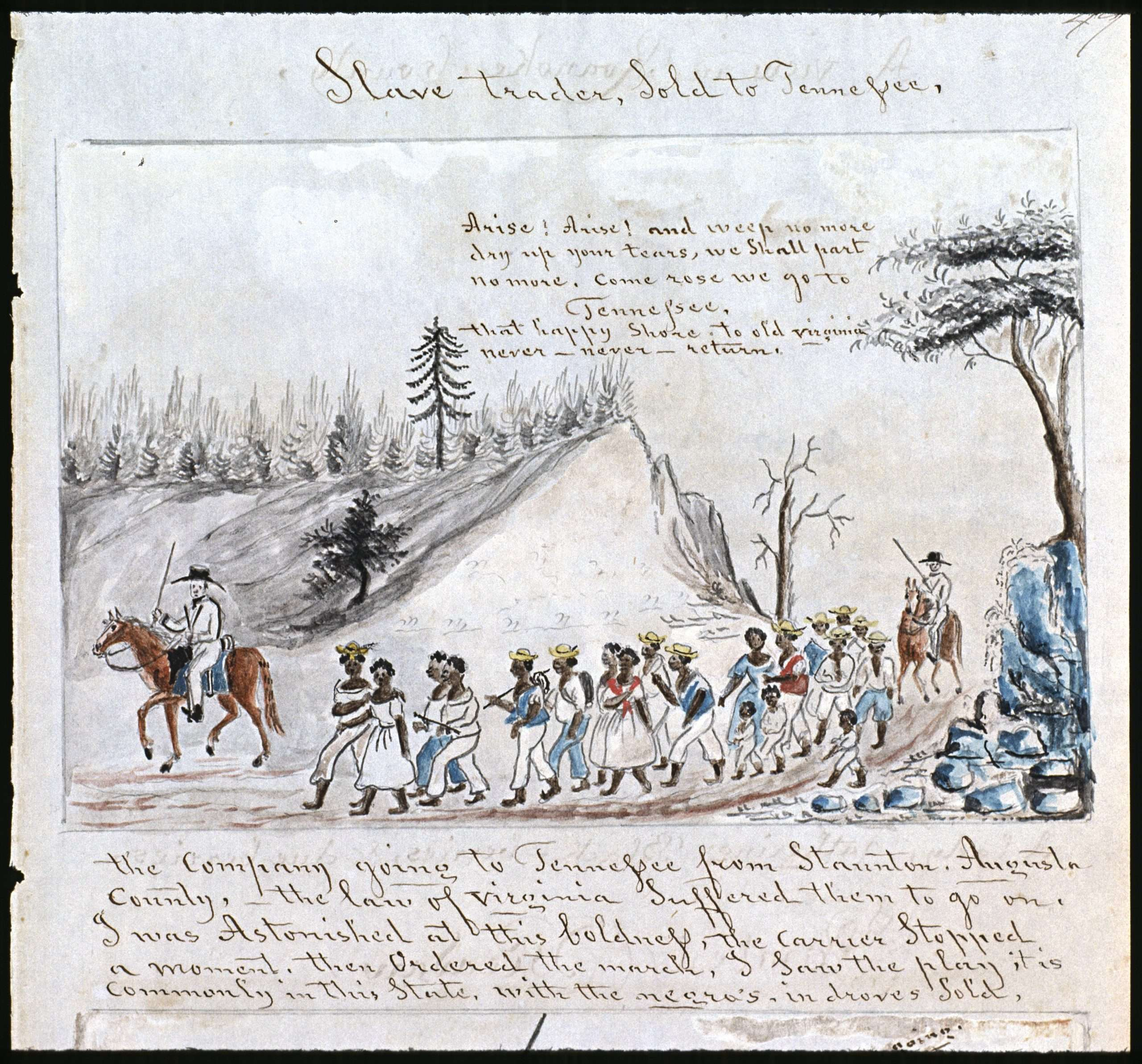
"Slave Trader, Sold to Tennessee" by an unknown artist

The returns gained by traders from the sale price of slaves were offset by both the fall in the value of land, that resulted from the subsequent decrease in the marginal productivity of land, and the fall in the price of output, which occurred due to the increase in market size as given by westward expansion. Kotlikoff suggested that the net effect of the inter-regional slave trade on the economy of the Old South was negligible, if not negative.

The profits realized through the sale and shipment of enslaved people were in turn reinvested in banking, railroads, and even colleges. A striking example of the connection between the domestic slave trade and higher education can be found in the 1838 sale of 272 slaves by the Maryland Jesuits to Louisiana; a small portion of the proceeds of the sale was used to pay down the debts of Georgetown College. Caroline Donovan endowed a chair at Johns Hopkins in 1889 using part of the fortune accumulated by her late husband, Baltimore trader Joseph S. Donovan.

In the words of one scholar, slaveholders were, fundamentally, "speculator[s]" who hoped "to endow [their] progeny for generations to come" through the "capital accumulation" represented in the growing numbers of people they enslaved. The returns from slave ownership, therefore, were long-term and intergenerational.

— Robert Crosby, An Unholy Traffic, 2024

== Markets and traders ==
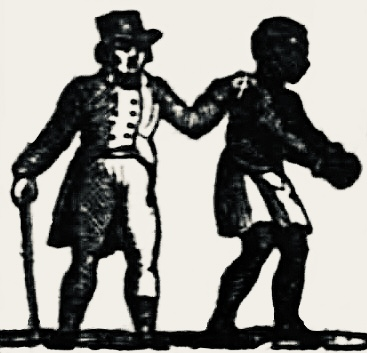
1844 newspaper icon depicting white man with suit and cane, and shackled enslaved black person

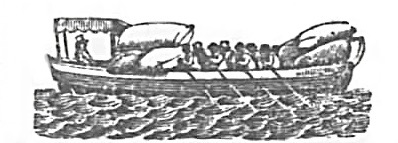
1829 newspaper icon for "cotton boats" and "cotton freighting" advertisements placed by Tennessee River shipping companies in Alabama

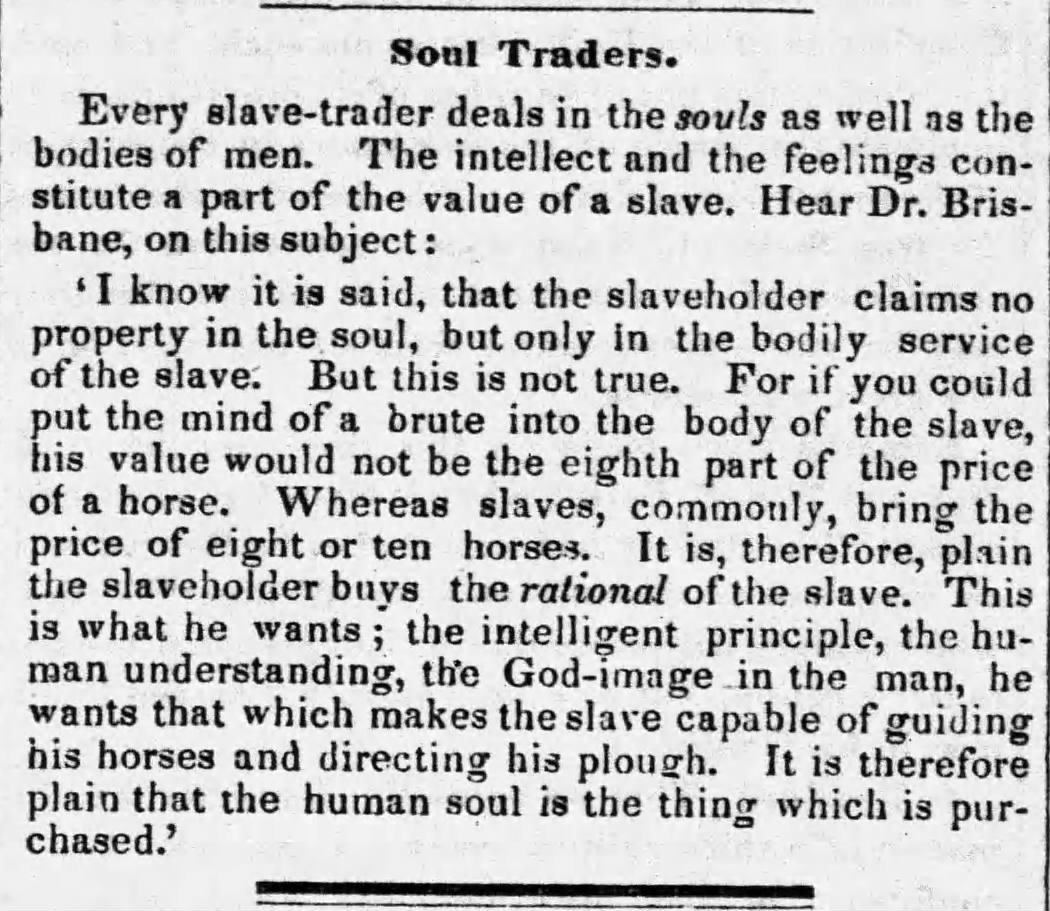
"Soul Traders" The Liberator, July 15, 1842

In their day, slave traders were called everything from broker, the generic term favored in Charleston, to nigger-trader (sometimes transcribed as niggah-tradah), a term that appears in both slave traders' own descriptions of themselves in oral interviews and in records of African-American folk music of the era. Negro trader, negro speculator, and slave dealer were common occupational titles that appeared in census records and city directories. Anti-slavery activists called them soul drivers. Slaves sometimes spoke of the Georgia-man who would take them away to, if not the geographical Georgia, an allegorical "Georgia," elsewhere in the cotton and sugar lands far south from where they were raised.

In the earliest years of the market, "dozens of independent speculators ... bought lots of ten or so slaves, generally on credit, in Upper-South states like Virginia and Maryland." In 1836 a Philadelphia paper characterized the work of negro brokers: "They conceive the business of pawn brokers and merchandize brokers. They lend money on the security of slaves, taking the latter as a pledge, to be sold if the pledge be not redeemed. They advance cash on slaves to be sold at auction or private sale, deducting from the proceeds of sale their commission and expenses. They buy and sell slaves upon commission, to suit their customers, and sometimes doubtless, buy and sell free people of color on pretence of their being slaves."

The argument has been made that the domestic slave trade was one that resulted in "superprofits" for traders. But Jonathan Pritchett points to evidence that there were a significant number of firms engaged in the market, a relatively dense concentration of these firms, and low barriers to entry. He says that traders who were exporting slaves from the Upper South were price-taking, profit-maximizers acting in a market that achieved a long-run competitive equilibrium.

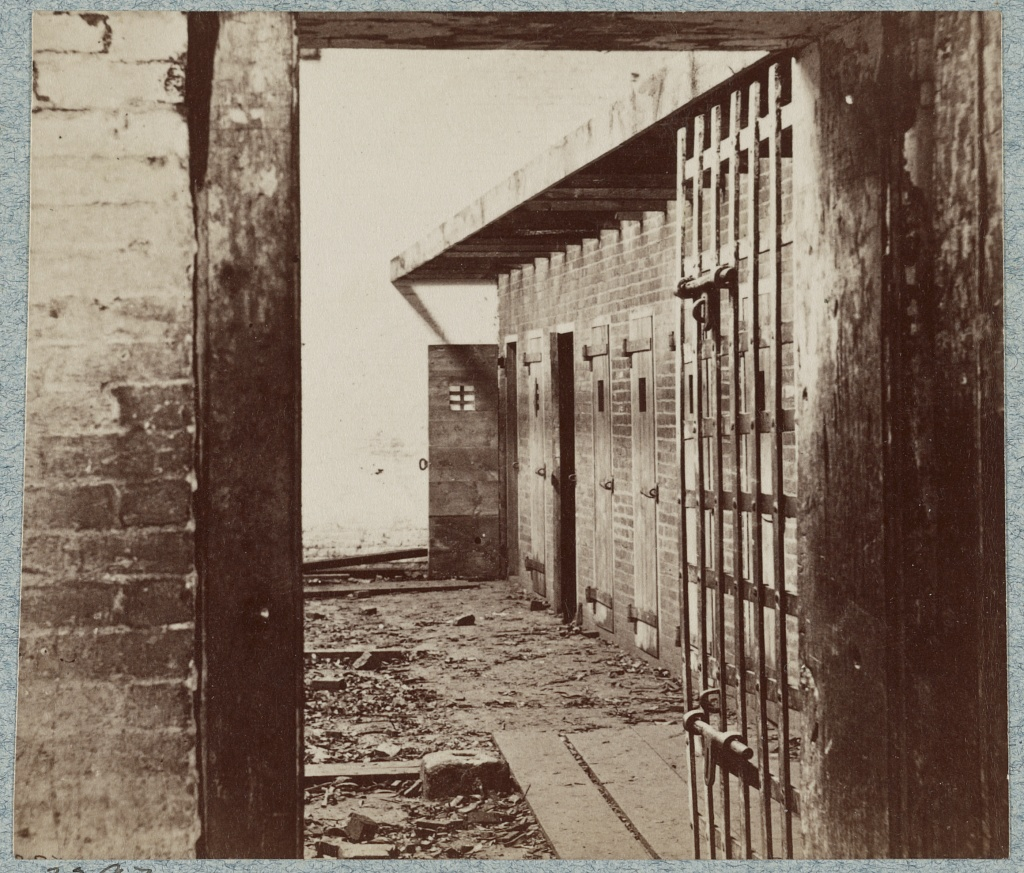
Price, Birch & Co. slave pen in Alexandria, Virginia, originally built by Franklin & Armfield; the slave trade was outlawed in the District of Columbia in 1850, local traders simply re-established their operations across the Potomac River

Using an admittedly limited set of data from Dunning School historian Ulrich Phillips (includes market data from Richmond, Charleston, mid-Georgia, and Louisiana), Robert Evans Jr. estimates that the average differential between slave prices in the Upper South and Deep South markets from 1830–1835 was $232. In 1876, Tarlton Arterburn told a newspaper reporter that they'd made an average profit of 30 to 40 percent "per head".

Evans suggests that interstate slave traders earned a wage greater than that of an alternative profession in skilled mechanical trades. However, if slave traders possessed skills similar to those used in supervisory mechanics (e.g. skills used by a chief engineer), then slave traders received an income that was not greater than the one they would have received had they entered in an alternative profession. In addition to full-time traders, so-called tavern traders worked on a small scale, especially in the first quarter of the 19th century, examples being the slave auctions held at Garland Burnett's tavern in Baltimore, Washington Robey's slave pen and tavern in Washington, D.C., Turner Brashears of Brashears' Stand along the Natchez Trace, as well as the notorious Patty Cannon ring in Delaware.

Chesapeake cities like Baltimore, Alexandria, Washington, D.C., and Richmond were "slave collecting and resale centers." Major slave-buying markets were located Charleston, Savannah, Memphis, and above all, New Orleans. Economists estimate that more than 135,000 enslaved people were sold in New Orleans between 1804 and 1862. Some traders only bought and sold locally; smaller interstate trading companies would typically have both upper south and lower south locations, for buying and selling, respectively. Larger interstate firms, like Franklin & Armfield, and Bolton, Dickens & Co., might have locations or traders under contract in a dozen cities. Dealers in the upper south worked to collect what they called "shipping lots"—enough people to be worth spending time and money arranging for their transport south. There was a trading season, namely winter and spring, because summer and autumn were planting and harvesting time; farmers and plantation owners generally would not buy or sell until that year's crop was in. The seasonality of the trade is visible in the record books of Missouri trader John R. White, which show that "Over 90 percent of the slaves imported to New Orleans were sold in the six months between November and April."

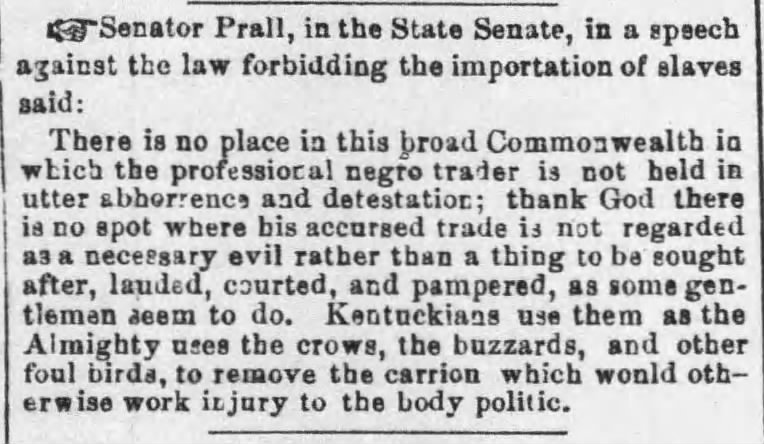
"Senator Prall" Louisville Courier-Journal, March 7, 1860

The notion that slave traders were social outcasts of low reputation, even in the South, was initially promulgated by defensive southerners and later by figures like historian Ulrich B. Phillips. Historian Frederic Bancroft, author of Slave-Trading in the Old South (1931) found—to the contrary of Phillips' position—that many traders were esteemed members of their communities. Members of the "best families," and a number of leading lights of the early Republic, including Chief Justice John Marshall and seventh President Andrew Jackson, were engaged in slave speculation. Contemporary researcher Steven Deyle argues that the "trader's position in society was not unproblematic and owners who dealt with the trader felt the need to satisfy themselves that they acted honorably," while Michael Tadman contends that "'trader as outcast' operated at the level of propaganda" whereas white slave owners almost universally professed a belief that slaves were not human like them, and thus dismissed the consequences of slave trading as beneath consideration. Similarly, historian Charles Dew read hundreds of letters to slave traders and found virtually zero narrative evidence for guilt, shame, or contrition about the slave trade: "If you begin with the absolute belief in white supremacy—unquestioned white superiority/unquestioned black inferiority—everything falls neatly into place: the African is inferior racial 'stock,' living in sin and ignorance and barbarism and heathenism on the 'Dark Continent' until enslaved .... Slavery thus miraculously becomes a form of 'uplift' for this supposedly benighted and brutish race of people. And once notions of white supremacy and black inferiority are in place in the American South, they are passed on from one generation to the next with all the certainty and inevitability of a genetic trait." And yet despite the dehumanizing doctrines of white supremacy that seemingly mandated separatism and black oppression, there is evidence that at least some slave traders were perfectly capable of recognizing enslaved people as human, rather than some form of livestock: a not-insignificant number of white slave traders provided for the families of mixed-raced children they'd formed with women they'd once enslaved. An enslaved woman named Charity Bowery told Lydia Child that she was sold to a trader sometime before 1848 but "Bowery had often served the man oysters from a food stand she operated, even when he was unable to pay. The slave trader remembered her kindness, and after he bought Bowery and several of her children, he set her and one of the children free as recompense." Multiple sources attest that Baltimore slave trader James F. Purvis quit the human-trafficking business and devoted himself to banking and charity projects after a religious conversion, and New Orleans trader Elihu Creswell emancipated his 51 slaves upon his death and even funded their transportation to free states. As historian Deyle put it in Carry Me Back (2005): "While there is no record of any slave traders feeling guilt over what they did for a living, the actions taken by the New Orleans dealer Elihu Creswell do raise some questions." Abolitionist Lewis Hayden wrote to Harriet Beecher Stowe, "I knew a great many of them, such as Neal, McAnn [Neal McCann?], Cobb, Stone, Pulliam, and Davis, &c. They were like Haley, they meant to repent when they got through."

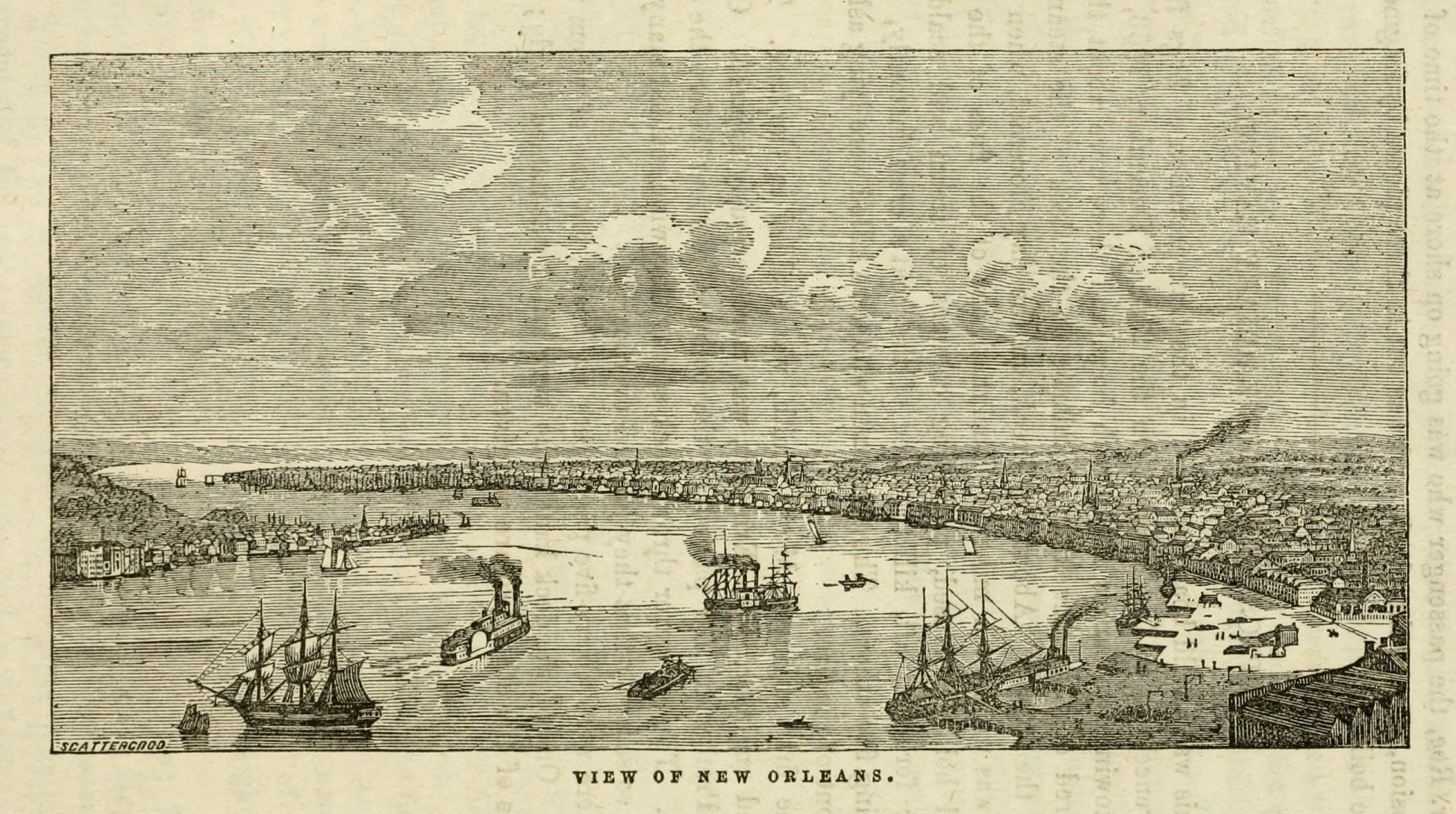
View of the port of New Orleans circa 1855 by Scattergood from Lloyd's Steamboat Directory

Stowe commented on slave traders in A Key to Uncle Tom's Cabin (1853), in reference to her fictional character Mr. Haley:

The writer has drawn in this work only one class of the negro-traders. There are all varieties of them, up to the great wholesale purchasers, who keep their large trading-houses; who are gentlemanly in manners and courteous in address; who, in many respects, often perform actions of real generosity; who consider slavery a very great evil, and hope the country will at some time be delivered from it, but who think that so long as clergyman and layman, saint and sinner, are all agreed in the propriety and necessity of slave holding, it is better that the necessary trade in the article be conducted by men of humanity and decency, than by swearing, brutal men, of the Tom Loker school. These men are exceedingly sensitive with regard to what they consider the injustice of the world, in excluding them from good society, simply because they undertake to supply a demand in the community, which the bar, the press, and the pulpit, all pronounce to be a proper one. In this respect, society certainly imitates the unreasonableness of the ancient Egyptians, who employed a certain class of men to prepare dead bodies for embalming, but flew at them with sticks and stones the moment the operation was over, on account of the sacrilegious liberty which they had taken. If there is an ill-used class of men in the world, it is certainly the slave-traders; for, if there is no harm in the institution of slavery, if it is a divinely-appointed and honourable one, like civil government and the family state, and like other species of property relation, then there is no earthly reason why a man may not as innocently be a slave-trader as any other kind of trader.

== Product and price ==
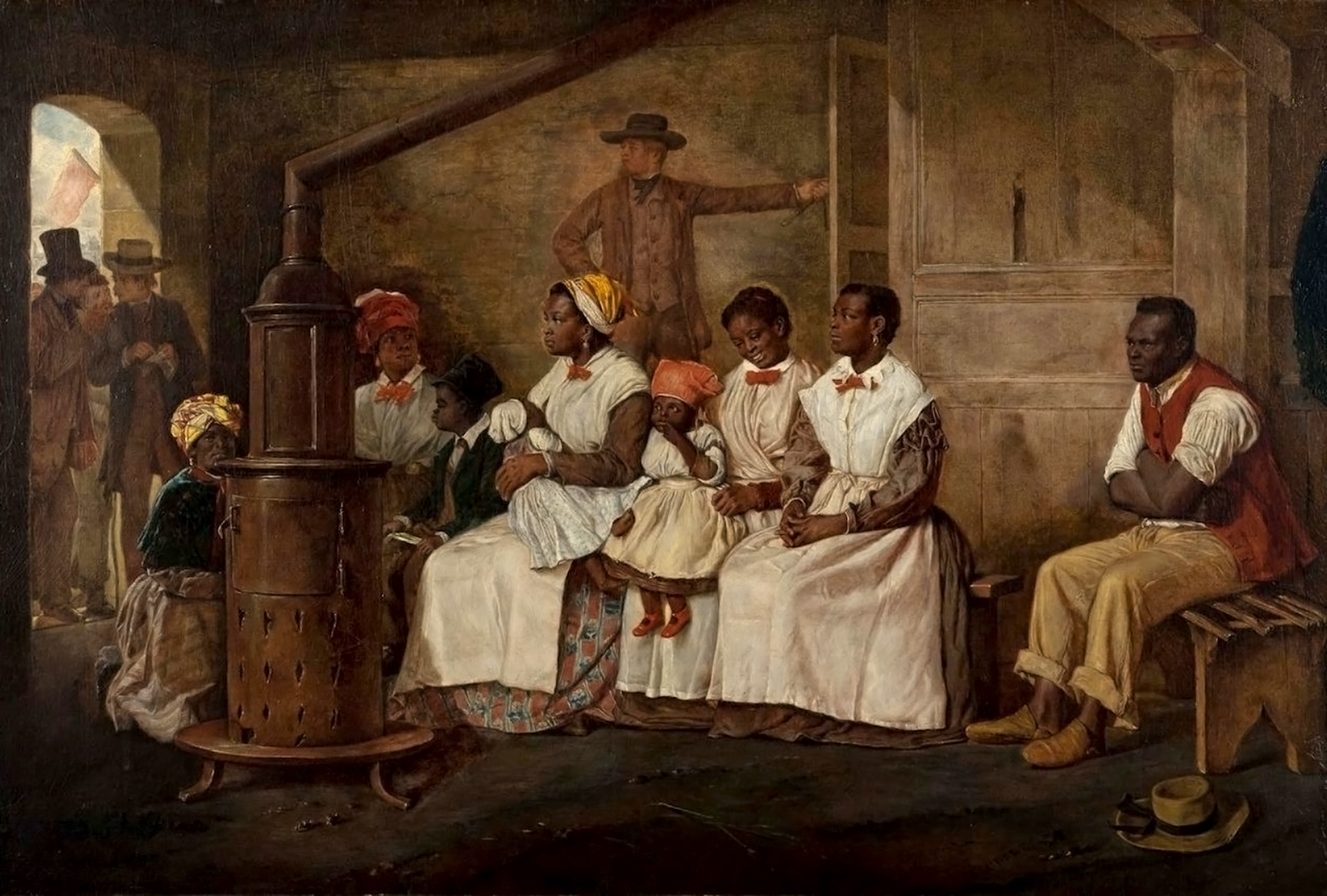
Eyre Crowe's Slaves Waiting for Sale—Richmond, Virginia was painted 1861 from a sketch made 1853 while he was touring the United States with the writer William Thackeray

Male slaves were worth more than female slaves; one study found that on average males sold for nine percent more than females. But female slaves came with "increase"—children born enslaved to an enslaved woman were saleable, thus providing excellent return on investment. Prime age slaves were those ages 10 to 35, or more broadly enslaved children older than eight and enslaved adults younger than 40, because people of those ages were presumed to be able work and/or reproduce for an extended period of time. Overall, buyers competed most for male field hands aged 18 to 30, so "the selling price of this class supplied something of a basis for the sale of all Negroes". As a rule, there was an inverse correlation between age and price for enslaved people over 40. For example, in 1835 South Carolina, when Ann Ball spent almost US$80,000 (equivalent to $2,496,774 in 2025) to buy 215 enslaved people from the estates of her deceased relatives, she made a point to buy several apparently elderly slaves (Old Rachel, Old Lucy, Old Charles) and the lowest-priced single person was Old Peg, purchased for US$20 (equivalent to $624.19 in 2025), compared to an average price of $371 per. Another illustration of comparative slave prices is from the District of Columbia Compensated Emancipation program: "The highest priced slave was a blacksmith worth $1800, and the lowest [priced was] a two-months-old mulatto baby, worth $25."

On the other end of the price spectrum from old women and babies is the amount men would pay for sexual access to physically attractive young female slaves, the so-called "fancy girls," such as was the case is this post-war boast by former slave trader Jack Campbell: "Long as you ask about it, I remember the biggest money I ever got for a nigger was $9,000 for a devilish pretty quadroon wench that I sold in Louisville, about '52 or '53. She was only 18, and was about as white as you or me, and her two children had light, curly hair. Her master lived down near Bowling Green, and though he didn't want to part with her he was so down on his luck that he had to sell her. I heard, too, that his wife swore that nigger must leave the plantation or she would go home to her family. My instructions were not to take less than $6,000 for the girl, and I was to get a big percentage on all over that, so when they put her on the block I talked her up for all she was worth .... There was more than twenty men bidding for her, and the fellow that got her for $9,000 was a rich and gay young bachelor from Tennessee, who happened to be in the city on a spree and was attracted by curiosity to the sale. He was a little drinky and wasn't caring anything for his ducats. He was so set on having the girl, I believe he would have given $20,000 for her if anybody had bid her up that high. He carried her home that day, and I ain't going to tell you anything more about him than that he made a big name in the Southern army and was killed at the head of his soldiers. One of this woman's children by her first master lives in a Massachusetts town now and is a rich man. There isn't a sign of black blood in him." The amount $9,000 in 1853 would be over $250,000 today. Another example of the value of enslaved girls most likely sold for sex compared to slaves sold for field labor is found in the papers of slave trader Joseph Erwin. Slave prices were high in the year 1818, and records show Erwin sold $19,000 worth of people that year. The highest prices were paid for three prime-age male field hands, Hooper, Sam, and Peter, priced at $1,250, $1,200, and $1,500, and for "a quadroon, Chloe, aged 12 and warranted a slave for life ... sold to Dominie DeVerbois for the price of $1,800."

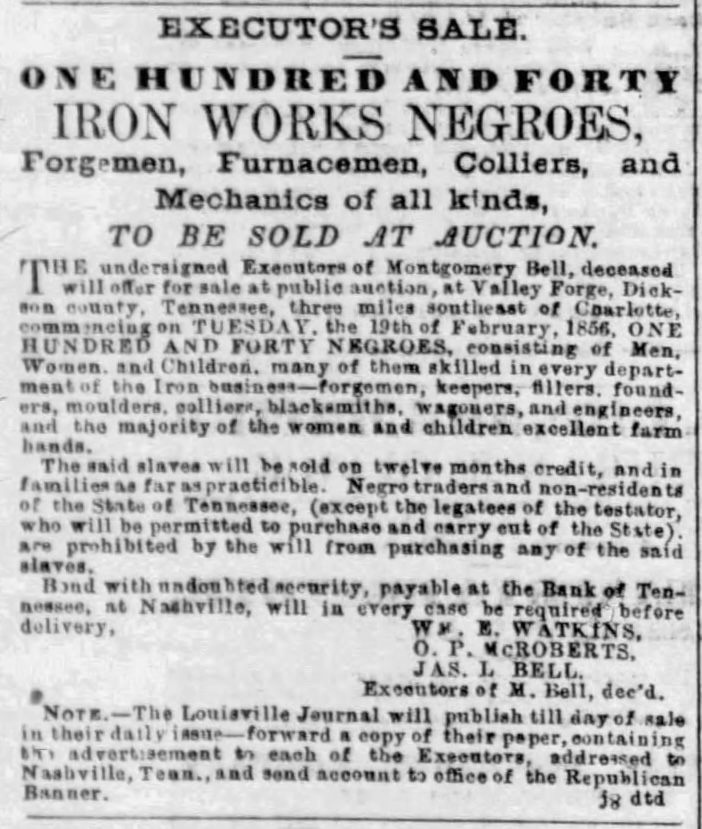
Under the terms of Montgomery Bell's will, 140 "Iron Works Negroes, Forgemen, Furnacemen, Colliers, and Mechanics of all kinds" were to be sold at auction, "in families as far as practicable," and "Negro traders and non-residents of Tennessee" were expressly forbidden under the terms of the will "from purchasing any of the slaves" (The Courier-Journal, Louisville, Ky., Feb. 12, 1856)

There were several broad categories of work for which enslaved people were purchased: agriculture, domestic service, mechanical, and commercial-industrial. Agricultural workers grew and processed cash crops like cotton and sugar, or managed herds of cattle in Texas, etc. Domestics worked in the household or in hotels and taverns, cooking, cleaning, laundering clothes, producing household goods, and providing childcare, including supplying the free white babies they cared for with their own human milk. Mechanics were expensive and prized: these were the smiths, builders, craftsmen, etc. Finally, commercial-industrial slaves were put to work all over the south in ironworks, salt mines, steamboat boiler rooms, on railroads, at gin-houses, bagasse-burners, lumber mills, turpentine stills, and so forth. The owner of a slave might or might not be a slave's employer: owners often rented, leased, or "hired out" their slaves.

According to historian Bancroft, in the great slave market that was New Orleans, enslaved people imported from Virginia, and to a lesser extent Maryland and South Carolina, were advertised as an especially desirable product, whereas "the many slaves brought from Missouri and Kentucky" were rarely advertised by their place of origin. "Acclimated" slaves known to be immune to yellow fever and other communicable diseases also commanded a premium.

Richmond slave market prices, fall 1849
Category	Price range
No. 1 men	$825 to $850
No. 1 women	$600 to $700
Plow boys 5 ft 2 inches	$650 to $675
Girls 4 ft 4 inches	$425 to $450
Girls 4 ft 6 inches	$475
Girls 4 ft 8 inches	$500
Good women with one child	$650 to $700

In 1858 the Wiregrass Reporter of Georgia advised estimating "the value of enslaved Black people by a formula of '$100 for every cent per pound of cotton.' The example given suggests that if cotton is 10 cents per pound, you should pay $1000 for an enslaved person." In 1860, the editors of the Vicksburg, Mississippi, city directory reported that the wealth of city included 1,236 slaves collectively valued at $876,300. There were more than 12,000 people enslaved in Williamson County, Tennessee in 1860; the resale value of those slaves was estimated to be US$6,000,000 (equivalent to $193,500,000 in 2025) as of 1862.

According to economist Laurence Kotlikoff, as the American Civil War was beginning in 1861, the typical price of a prime-age male slave sold in New Orleans was US$1,381 (equivalent to $49,486 in 2025). On average the prices for light-skinned female slaves were 5.4 percent higher than the prices for darker-skinned female slaves, possibly indicating colorism and sexual attraction as a factor in a market dominated by male buyers. Per Kotlikoff's calculations, "Throughout the ante-bellum 1800s, positive premia were paid for males, skilled slaves, slaves with guarantees, and children sold with their mothers." A newspaper report in February 1860 claimed that a 33-year-old "first rate carpenter" sold for US$3,500 (equivalent to $125,417 in 2025) at an estate sale and the buyer was immediately offered $4,000 for him, suggesting to the reporter that enslaved people had become, by weight, more valuable than silver.

== Routes ==
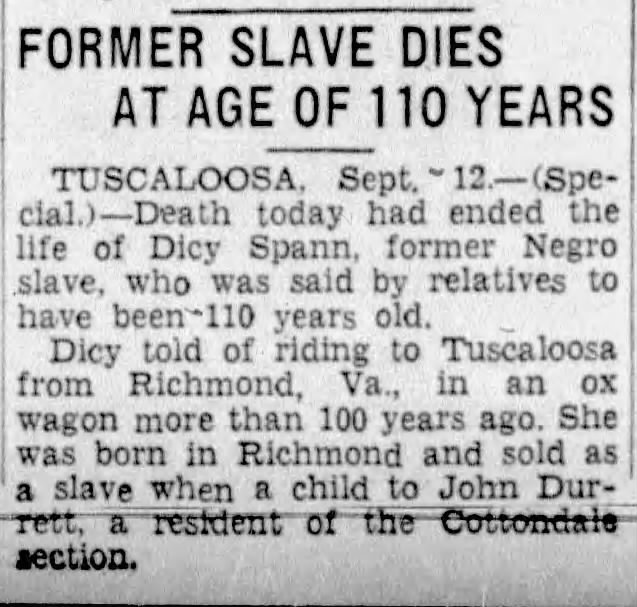
"Dicy told of riding to Tuscaloosa from Richmond, Va., in an ox wagon more than 100 years ago. She was born in Richmond and sold as a slave when a child to John Durrett, a resident of the Cottondale section." The Birmingham Post, Birmingham, Alabama, September 12, 1938)

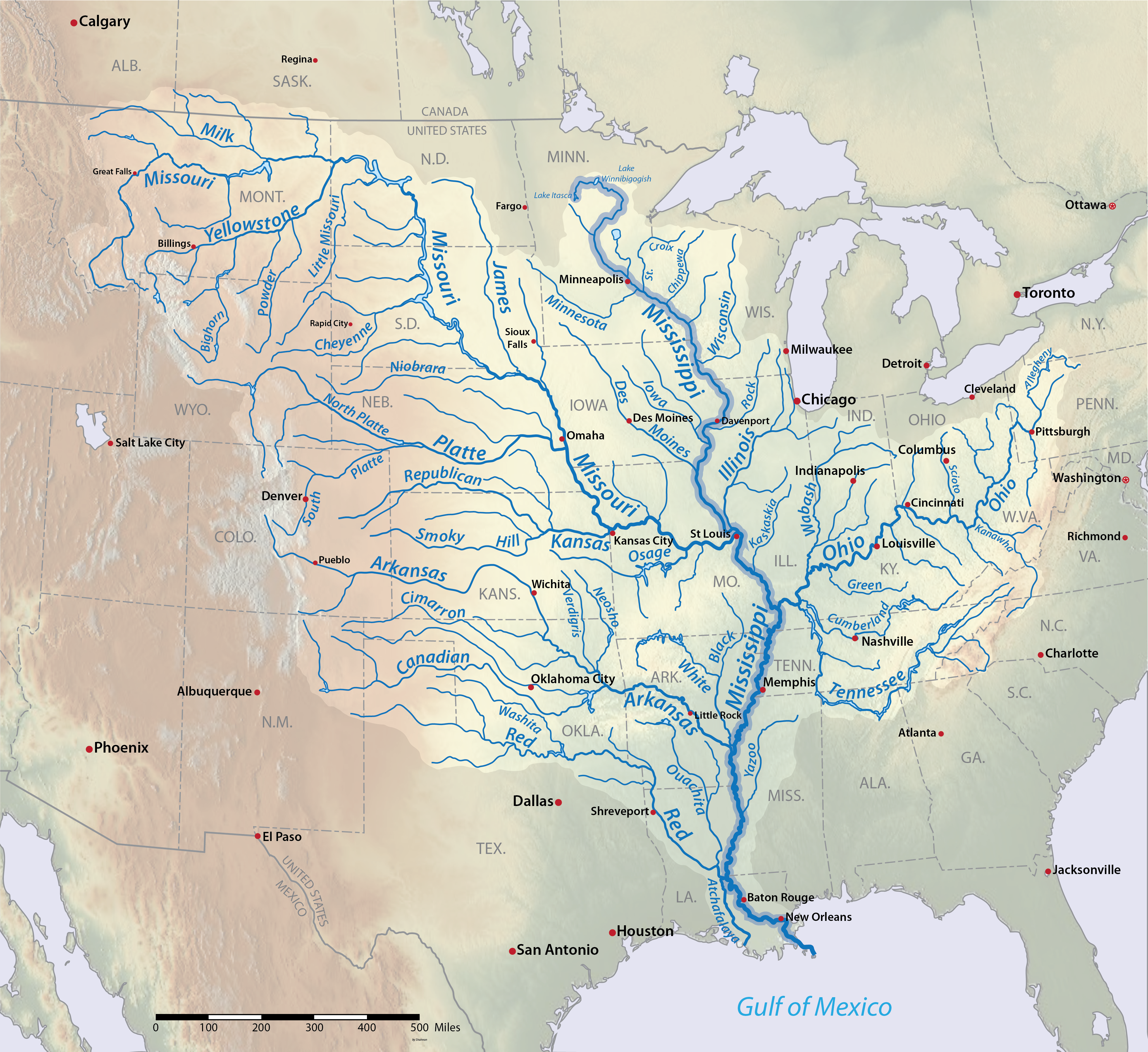
Mississippi River watershed

There were four main methods of forced transportation of the enslaved. Initially, transport was either on foot or by sailing ship, but following the popularization of the railroad and the steamboat in the 1840s, both were commonly used.

- Overland transport: In many cases slaves were relocated simply by walking them in chains, double-file, in groups of 50 to 200, between counties or states. Chained columns of slaves could be expected to travel about 20 mi (32 km) a day.
- Ocean-going ship: The coastwise slave trade, in which enslaved people were transported on commercial sailing ships and steamships between the East Coast and the Gulf Coast via the Atlantic Ocean and the Gulf of Mexico, was busiest between the Chesapeake Bay region and the cities of the Mississippi Delta, but virtually any ship that departed south of the Mason-Dixon Line to points further south would have likely carried slaves for sale. A typical trip from the port at Norfolk to New Orleans might be a three-week journey. A statistical analysis of all known records of Baltimore–New Orleans slave shipments from 1820 to 1860 found that brigs were the type of ship used in about half of all shipments, and voyages commonly lasted between 21 and 35 days.
- Transportation via navigable inland rivers: Before 1820, keelboats, flatboats, and barges were used for riverine transport of slaves. River steamboat, by the 1850s, reduced the journey between St. Louis to New Orleans to just a few days. Slaves were transported on virtually every tributary of the Mississippi River watershed where slavery was legal, from as far up the Ohio River as Wheeling, West Virginia, and Louisville, Kentucky, down the Cumberland River from Nashville, and up the Red River of the South through Louisiana and Arkansas. Any navigable inland waterway or ship that was used to transport goods that were produced with slave labor was also used to transport slaves to buyers: the Delaware River was used to take slaves to market in colonial Pennsylvania; the Chattahoochee River was access to the slave markets at Columbus, Georgia, etc.
- Rail transport: As early as 1841, Southern railroad companies bought male slaves to build railroads, with at least 85 of 113 railroads in the former Confederacy having used enslaved labor for construction within and between states.

=== Specific routes ===
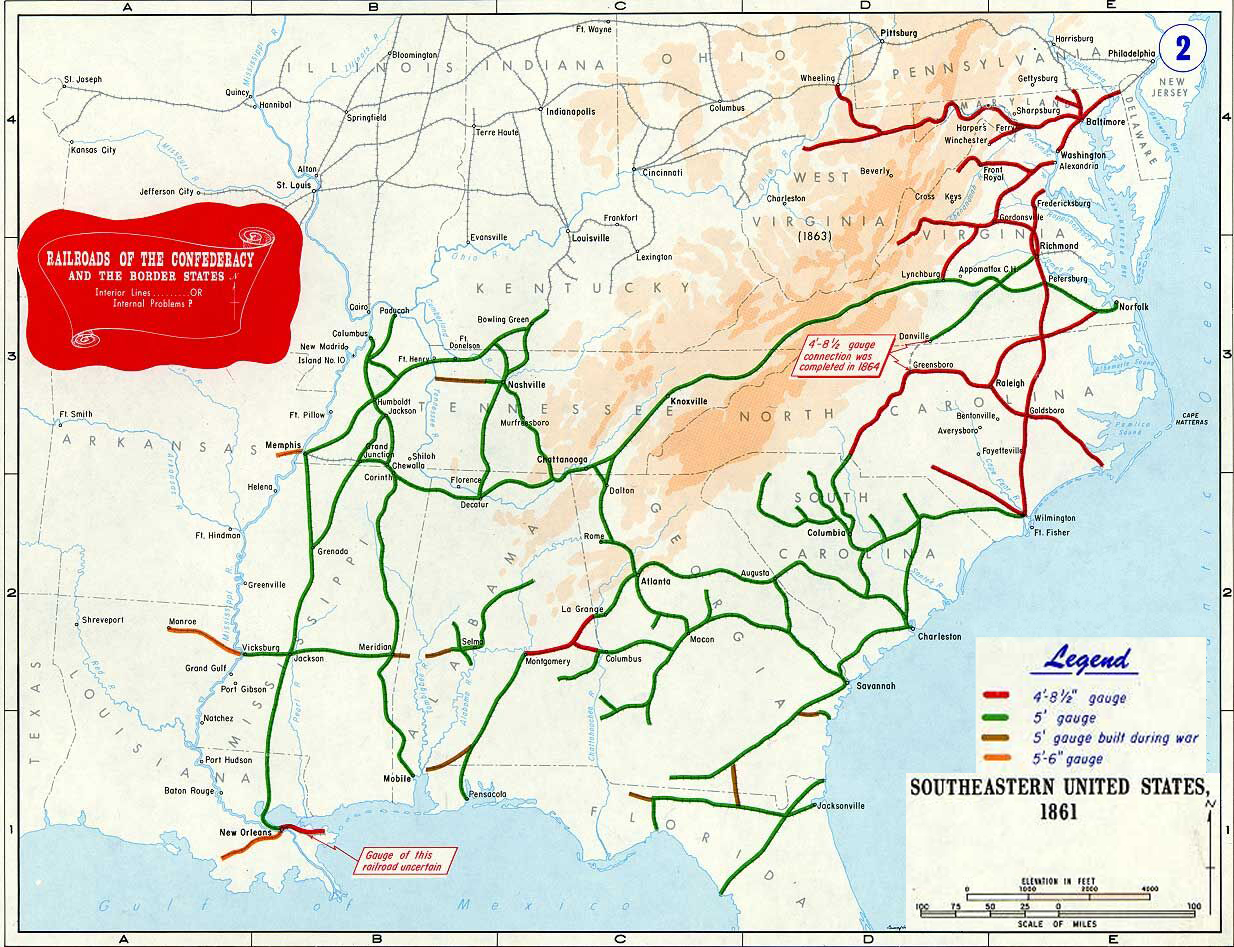
Railroad network of the Southern states c. 1861 (West Point Atlas of the American Civil War, 1962)

- Montgomery became the leading slave market in Alabama because of its accessibility by both water and land, due to its connection to both the Federal Road and the Alabama River, the latter of which saw steamboats shipping slaves up the river from Mobile.
- The Wilderness Road connected Virginia to Kentucky and east Tennessee, and from there through the Cumberland Gap to Georgia and Alabama.
- The Natchez Trace was used to bring slaves from middle Tennessee and to the Forks of the Road and Vicksburg slave markets in Mississippi. The Devil's Backbone, a history of the Trace, states that one "traveler on the road described such 'a long procession' of slaves going down the Trace 'like a troop of wearied pilgrims.' The slow pace, the fatigued air, and their tattered garments 'gave to the whole train a'sad and funereal appearance.'"
- Slave trader Byrd Hill was one of the promoters of the Memphis and Hernando Plank Road.
- The South Carolina Rail Road allowed Charleston traders to sell slaves to Georgians "for personal use" at the Hamburg slave market on the Savannah River.
- Kentucky slave traders, for their part, used the Mobile and Ohio Railroad, the Louisville and Nashville Railroad, and the southern branches of the present Illinois Central railroads to deliver enslaved people to the Deep South.
- The Forrest brothers no doubt used the Mississippi and Tennessee Railroad to deliver enslaved people from Memphis to the wye at Grenada, Mississippi, where some of Forrests were known to have traded and lived.

Combining modes was also common, for example, as reported in the Anti-Slavery Bugle in 1849:

"A week ago last Monday morning I took the cars at Baltimore for Washington. While standing on the platform where passengers step into the ears, Rev. John F. Cook of this City, came up and entered into conversation with me. He had been to Baltimore to preach the day before. While talking we advanced a few steps, which brought us opposite the Jim Crow car, in which were seated a clerk or runner from Donovan's slave-pen, with five slaves, a young man and woman, the exact picture of despondency and desolation, and three children, who seemed satisfied with the novelty of the scene about them. These slaves were on their way to Alexandria, to be sent thence overland, by Bruin & Hill, to the far Southern market."—"Slavery in the District" Anti-Slavery Bugle, July 6, 1849

== Law ==
Research into South Carolina slavery has found "Fifty percent of South Carolina's antebellum sales of slaves took place at court sales, which included sheriffs' sales...and also probate and equity court sales...The auction image from the commercial slave marts neglects and omits the most important actors and institutions in the slave auctioneering business. A more accurate vision of the slave auction would make clearer the full involvement of law and legal officials." A researcher in Arkansas found that before the American Civil War, between 400 and 500 people were auctioned off at the Pulaski County courthouse, which at that time was in the same building as the Arkansas State Capitol. The site where the sales took place was just "five rough, uneven steps" in front of an unremarkable door with "three panels at the bottom and two windows at the top."

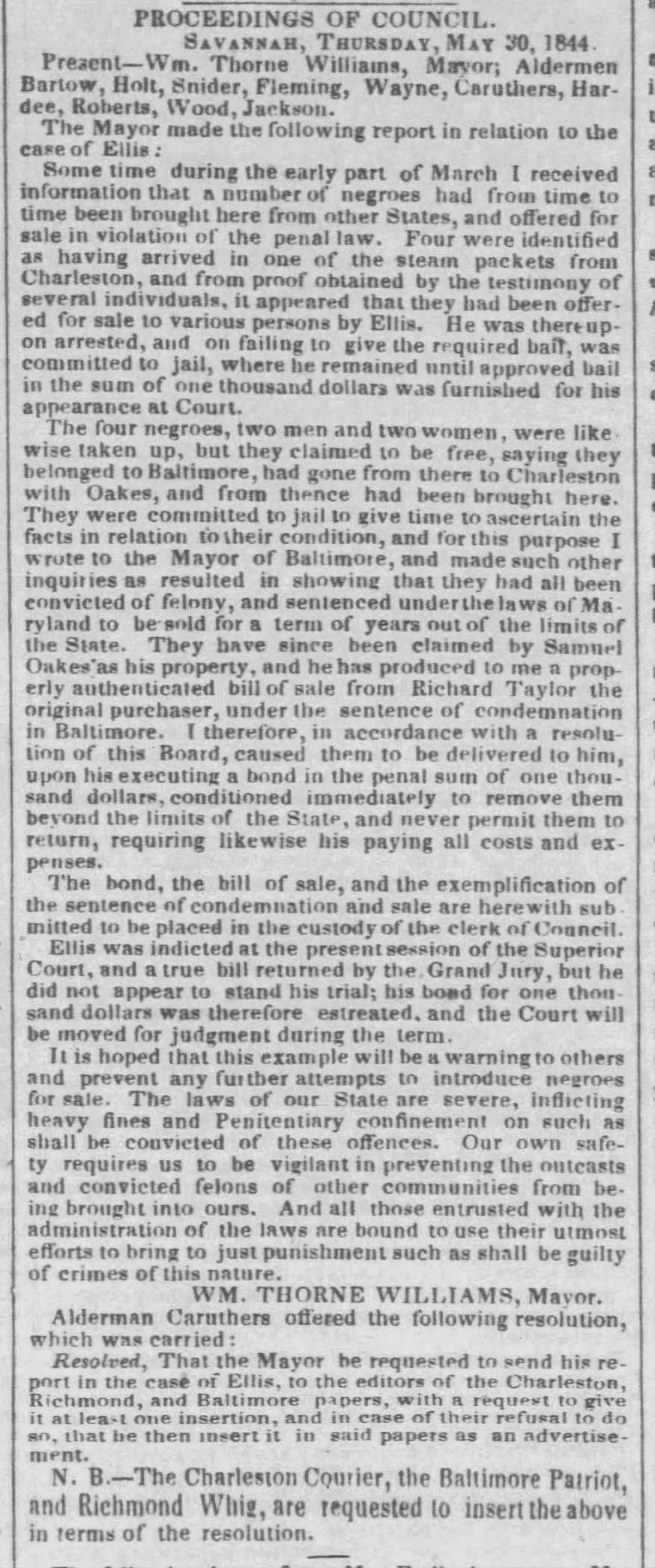
In 1844, Charlestonians were charged with illegally selling slaves into Savannah; the mayor of Savannah stated "It is hoped that this example will be a warning to others and prevent any fuither attempts to introduce negroes for sale. The laws of our State are severe, inflicting heavy fines and Penitentiary confinement on such as shall be convicted of these offences. Our own safety requires us to be vigilant in preventing the outcasts and convicted felons of other communities from being brought into ours."

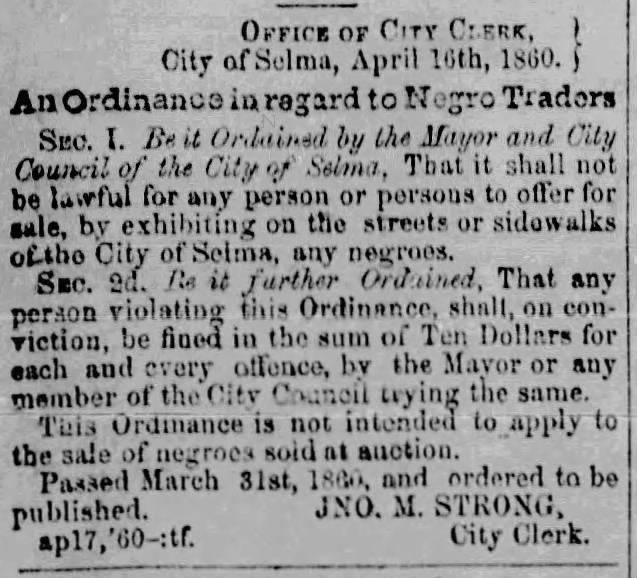
"An Ordinance in Regard to Negro Traders" prohibited outdoor slave sales, unless it was in the form of an auction, in which case it was fine (The Daily Selma Reporter, Selma, Alabama, June 1, 1860)

In the early 19th century several slave states had unenforced statutes prohibiting the interstate slave trade in hopes of minimizing the increase of black populations within those states. These laws were undermined in many ways; according to one contemporary newspaper:

Hamburg, South Carolina was built up just opposite Augusta, for the purpose of furnishing slaves to the planters of Georgia. Augusta is the market to which the planters of Upper and Middle Georgia bring their cotton; and if they want to purchase negroes, they step over into Hamburg and do so. There are two large houses there, with piazzas in front to expose the 'chattels' to the public during the day, and yards in rear of them where they are penned up at night like sheep, so close that they can hardly breathe, with bull-dogs on the outside as sentinels. They sometimes have thousands here for sale, who in consequence of their number suffer most horribly.

Similarly, in Alabama, a historian explained in 1845 that a ban had been undermined to the point that it was ultimately abandoned entirely:

The people of Alabama at one time became alarmed at the evils which they properly anticipated would grow out of this traffic. Their Legislators enacted laws against it, and for a short time they exercised salutary restraints; but soon they were evaded. The Creek Nation was then an Indian Territory, under the jurisdiction of the General Government, lying immediately on our eastern border. Here Negro Traders sought a shield for their operations, and our citizens went there to make purchases. Worn out at last with such subterfuges and shifts, the Legislature repealed this restrictive law

When Louisiana banned slave traders from out of state in 1832, Austin Woolfolk set up operations at Fort Adams, Mississippi, which was the first steamboat landing beyond the state line. Similarly, the organizing act for Mississippi Territory prohibited the introduction of slaves from outside the U.S. but "the foreign trade ban seems to have been ignored."

Bans on interstate slave trading
State	Notes
Alabama	Limitations on interstate slave trading passed 1832
Delaware	Banned imports and exports of slaves at statehood (1787)
Kentucky	Non-Importation Act passed 1833, repealed 1849
Louisiana	Imports banned 1826–1828; imports banned again 1831–1834, "largely ineffective"; "...slavers circumvented rules like Louisiana's strict requirement that captives entering the state bear certificates of good character by manufacturing fake certificates."
Georgia	Imports banned 1788, repealed in 1856
Mississippi	Banned in 1832 state constitution, never enforced, although there was 1837 legislation and case law about the issue (Groves v. Slaughter, Rowan v. Runnels, Hickman v. Rose). One news report in 1840 claimed that Mississippi slave owners had outstanding debts to slave traders totaling approximately US$2,000,000 (equivalent to $64,500,000 in 2025).
Tennessee	Banned 1827–1855; unenforced

== Music ==
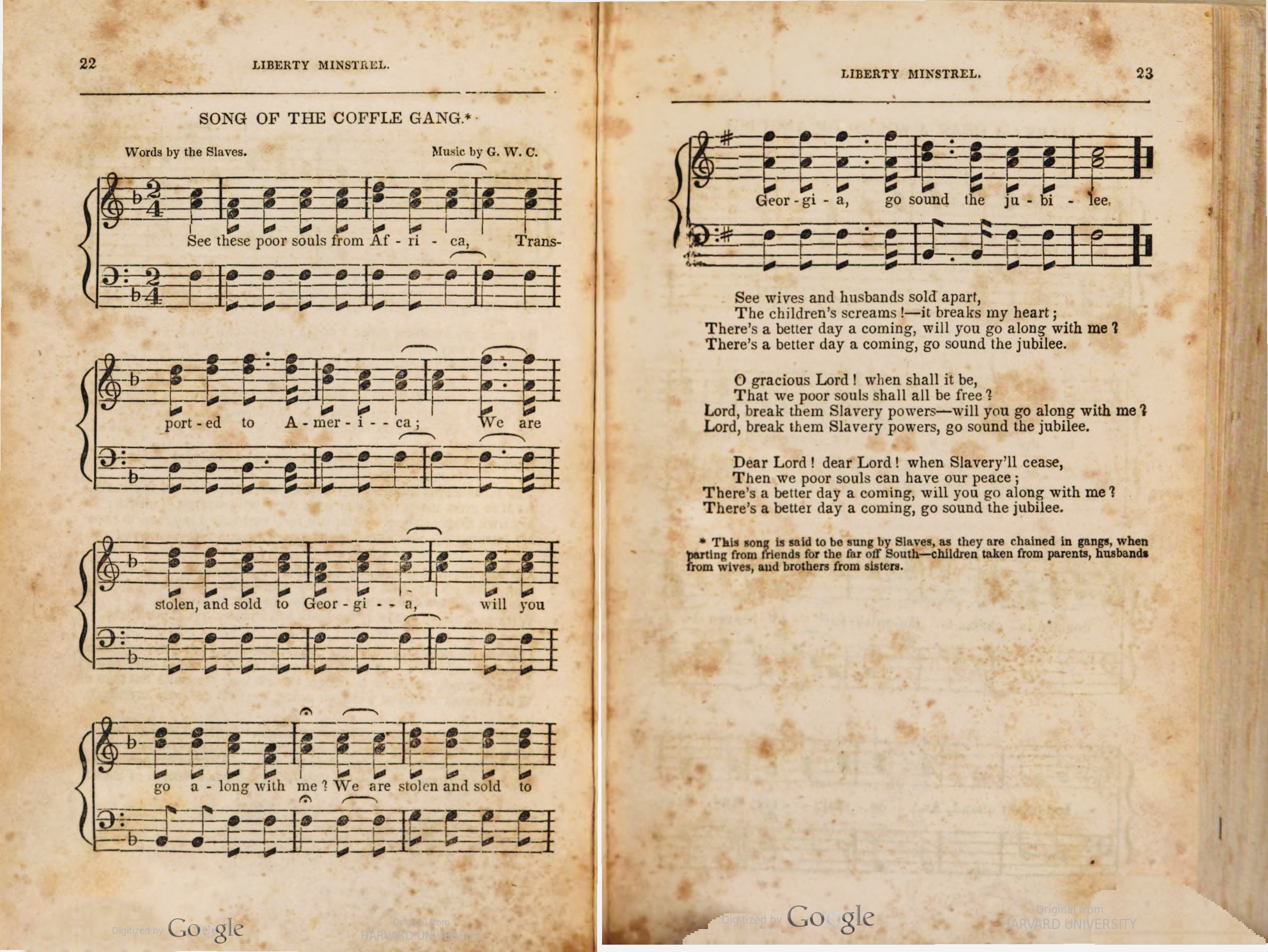
"Song of the Coffle Gang" is one of only two pieces of music in the 1845 abolitionist songbook The Liberty Minstrel that are not attributed to white abolitionists; the other one, "Stolen We Were," with "words by a colored man," starts with much the same language: "...stolen from Africa...brought to America..." Mike Seeger called it "an abolitionist song" and according to the Library of Congress, "the language of the song does not seem to match historic descriptions of songs coffle gangs were made to sing by slave traders"

The slave trade appears in the lyrics of working songs sung by African-American slaves in the antebellum U.S.:

It's old Van Horn, de nigger trader
Hilo! Hilo!
He sold his wife to buy a nigger
Hilo! Hilo!
He sold her first to Louisianner
Hilo! Hilo!
And den from dat to Alabammer
Hilo! Hilo!

— said to be a fragment of a much longer "negro corn-shucking song" (1859)

You're selling me to Georgy
But you cannot sell my soul
Thank God Almighty
God will fix it for us some day!
I hope my old gran'mother
Will meet poor John some day
I knows I won't know him, when I meets him
Cause he was so young when Dey sold him away

— Sarah Thomas interview, WPA Slave Narrative

Ladies, ain't you sorry!
Packet sails to-morrow,
Sails to Looisiana.
Ladies, ain't you sorry!
See, de trader got me!
Ladies, fare you well.

— "Contraband Songs" (1865), sung by boatmen at Savannah, Georgia

The light-wood fire was made, and the negroes dropped in from the neighboring plantations, singing as they came. The driver of the plantation, a colored man, brought out baskets of corn in the husk, and piled it in a heap; and the negroes began to strip the husks from the ears, singing with great glee as they worked, keeping time to the music, and now and then throwing in a joke and an extravagant burst of laughter. The songs were generally of a comic character; but one of them was set to a singularly wild and plaintive air, which some of our musicians would do well to reduce to notation. These are the words:

Johnny come down de hollow.
Oh hollow!
Johnny come down de hollow.
Oh hollow!
De nigger-trader got me.
Oh hollow!
De speculator bought me.
Oh hollow!
I'm sold for silver dollars.
Oh hollow!
Boys, go catch de pony.
Oh hollow!
Bring him round de corner.
Oh hollow!
I'm goin' away to Georgia.
Oh hollow!
Boys, good-by forever!
Oh hollow!

— William Cullen Bryant, Letters of a Traveller; Or, Notes of Things Seen in Europe and America (1850)

== See also ==
- Slave Trade Act of 1794
- Slave Trade Act of 1800
- Act Prohibiting Importation of Slaves
- Slave Trade Acts § United States
- Treatment of the enslaved in the United States
- Torture of slaves in the United States
- List of largest slave sales in the United States
- Bibliography of the slave trade in the United States

== Sources ==
- Flanders, Ralph Betts (1933). Plantation Slavery in Georgia. Chapel Hill, North Carolina: The University of North Carolina Press. LCCN 33037653. OCLC 9876467.
- Keith, LeeAnna (2008). The Colfax Massacre: The Untold Story of Black Power, White Terror, and the Death of Reconstruction. New York: Oxford University Press. ISBN 978-0-19-531026-9. LCCN 2007023368. OCLC 191027904.
- Russell, Thomas D. (2025) [1997]. "Slave Auctions on the Courthouse Steps: Court Sales of Slaves in Antebellum South Carolina". In Finkelman, Paul (ed.). Slavery & The Law. Madison House Publishers. pp. 329–364. doi:10.5040/9798881826758-chapter11. ISBN 979-8-8818-2675-8. LCCN 96008917. OCLC 1528562801.
