= Slave Trade Act of 1800 =

Law amending the Slave Trade Act of 1794

- Long title: An Act in Addition to the Act Intituled (sic) "An Act to Prohibit the Carrying on the Slave Trade from the United States to any Foreign Place or Country."
- Enacted by: the 6th United States Congress
- Effective: May 10, 1800

Citations
- Public law: Pub. L. 6–51
- Statutes at Large: 2 Stat. 70

Legislative history
- Signed into law by President John Adams on May 10, 1800

The Slave Trade Act of 1800 was a law passed by the United States Congress to build upon the Slave Trade Act of 1794, limiting American involvement in the trade of human cargo. It was signed into law by President John Adams on May 10, 1800. This was among several acts of Congress that eventually outlawed the importation of slaves to the United States. The owning of slaves, and the domestic trade, would later be made illegal throughout the U.S. by the Thirteenth Amendment to the United States Constitution in 1865 following the American Civil War.

== Passage ==
This bill was passed May 2, 1800, with a title addition to: An Act to prohibit the carrying on the Slave Trade from the United States to any foreign place or country.

== Text of the law ==
Be it enacted by the Senate and House of Representatives of the United States of America in Congress assembled, That it shall be unlawful for any citizen of the United States, or other person residing within the United States, directly or indirectly to hold or have any right or property in any vessel employed or made use of in the transportation or carrying of slaves from one foreign country or place to another, and any right or property, belonging as aforesaid, shall be forfeited, and may be libelled and condemned for the use of the person who shall sue for the same; and such person, transgressing the prohibition aforesaid, shall also forfeit and pay a sum of money equal to double the value of the right or property in such vessel, which he held as aforesaid; and shall also forfeit a sum of money equal to double the value of the interest which he may have had in the slaves, which at any time may have been transported or carried in such vessel, after the passing of this act, and against the form thereof.

SEC. 2. And be it further enacted, That it shall be unlawful for any citizen of the United States or other person residing therein, to serve on board any vessel of the United States employed or made use of in the transportation or carrying of slaves from one foreign country or place to another: and any such citizen or other person, voluntarily serving as aforesaid, shall be liable to be indicted therefor, and on conviction thereof shall be liable to a fine not exceeding two thousand dollars, and be imprisoned not exceeding two years.

SEC. 3. And be it further enacted, That if any citizen of the United States shall voluntarily serve on board of any foreign ship or vessel, which shall hereafter be employed in the slave trade, he shall, on conviction thereof, be liable to and suffer the like forfeitures, pains, disabilities and penalties as he would have incurred, had such ship or vessel been owned or employed, in whole or in part, by any person or persons residing within the United States.

SEC. 4. And be it further enacted, That it shall be lawful for any of the commissioned vessels of the United States, to seize and take any vessels employed in carrying on trade, business or traffic, contrary to the true intent and meaning of this or the said act to which this is in addition; and such vessel, together with her tackle, apparel and guns, and the goods or effects, other than slaves, which shall be found on board, shall be forfeited, and may be proceeded against in any of the district or circuit courts, and shall be condemned for the use of the officers and crew of the vessel making the seizure, and be divided in the proportion directed in the case of prize: and all persons interested in such vessel, or in the enterprise or voyage in which such vessel shall be employed at the time of such capture, shall be precluded from all right or claim to the slaves found on board such vessel as aforesaid, and from all damages or retribution on account thereof: and it shall moreover be the duty of the commanders of such commissioned vessels, to apprehend and take into custody every person found on board of such vessel so seized and taken, being of the officers or crew thereof, and him or them convey as soon as conveniently may be, to the civil authority of the United States in some one of the districts thereof, to be proceeded against in due course of law.

SEC. 5. And be it further enacted, That the district and circuit courts of the United States shall have cognizance of all acts and offences against the prohibitions herein contained.

SEC. 6. Provided nevertheless, and be it further enacted, That nothing in this act contained shall be construed to authorize the bringing into either of the United States, any person or persons, the importation of whom is, by the existing laws of such state, prohibited.

SEC. 7. And be it further enacted, That the forfeitures which shall hereafter be incurred under this, or the said act to which this is in addition, not otherwise disposed of, shall accrue and be one moiety thereof to the use of the informer, and the other moiety to the use of the United States, except where the prosecution shall be first instituted on behalf of the United States, in which case the whole shall be to their use.

The earlier 1794 Slave Trade Act outlawed the international slave trade on U.S. vessels and limited the trade of foreign ships in U.S. ports. The 1800 Act increased the fines and penalties and outlawed U.S. citizens and residents' investment in the trade, and the employment of U.S. citizens on foreign vessels involved in the trade.

== See also ==
- Slavery in the United States
- Atlantic slave trade
- 1820 U.S. Law on Slave Trade
- Slave Trade Acts
