= Slave Trade Act of 1794 =

U.S. law that limits involvement in the international slave trade

- Long title: An Act to prohibit the carrying on the Slave Trade from the United States to any foreign place or country
- Enacted by: the 3rd United States Congress
- Effective: March 22, 1794

Citations
- Public law: Pub. L. 3–11
- Statutes at Large: 1 Stat. 347

Legislative history
- Signed into law by President George Washington on March 22, 1794

Major amendments
- Slave Trade Act of 1800

United States Supreme Court cases
- The Emily and the Caroline

The Slave Trade Act of 1794 was a law passed by the United States Congress that prohibited the building or outfitting of ships in U.S. ports for the international slave trade. It was signed into law by President George Washington on March 22, 1794. This was the first of several anti-slave-trade acts of Congress. In 1800, Congress strengthened it by sharply raising the fines and awarding informants the entire value of any ship seized, as well as additional prohibitions on American investment and employment in the trade.

Federal outlawing of importation of slaves to the United States was enacted in 1807. The domestic trade and owning of slaves became illegal in the entire U.S. with the Thirteenth Amendment to the United States Constitution in 1865 following the American Civil War.

== Passage ==
The bill was introduced during the 3rd Congress that happened December 2, 1793. This bill was then passed March 22, 1794, with the title: An Act to prohibit the carrying on the Slave Trade from the United States to any foreign place or country.

== Text of the law ==
Section 1. Be it enacted by the Senate and House of Representatives of the United States of America in Congress assembled, That no citizen or citizens of the United States, or foreigner, or any other person coming into, or residing within the same, shall, for himself or any other person whatsoever, either as master, factor or owner, build, fit, equip, load or otherwise prepare any ship or vessel, within any port or place of said United States, nor shall cause any ship or vessel to sail from any port or place within same, for the purpose of carrying on any trade or traffic in slaves, to any foreign country; or for the purpose of procuring, from any foreign kingdom, place or country, the inhabitants of such kingdom, place or country, to be transported to any foreign country, port, or place whatever, to be sold or disposed of, as slaves: And if any ship or vessel shall be so fitted out, as aforesaid, for the said purposes, or shall be caused to sail, so as aforesaid, every ship or vessel, her tackle, furniture, apparel and other appurtenances, shall be forfeited to the United States; and shall be liable to be seized, prosecuted and condemned, in any of the circuit courts or district court for the district where said ship or vessel may be found and seized.

After the modification by the Slave Trade Act of 1800, Section 2 allowed for forfeiture by owners and the possibility of a $2,000 fine. Section 3 affected foreign merchants. Section 4 forfeited any slaves on board the ship and a fine of $200 per slave. In short, the Act limited the international slave trade to foreign ships, and foreign ships using United States' ports had to agree not to export from U.S. ports.

== First prosecution ==
In August 1795, Providence, Rhode Island merchant John Brown conspired to trade in slaves in contravention of the Act. Brown conspired with a Captain Peleg Wood with the ship Hope to be used in the slave trade. By November Hope was engaged in the slave trade, and in March 1796, the owners of the ship were fined by Rhode Island the amount of £200 for trading in slaves, which had been outlawed in that state. On a voyage in 1796, Brown's ship traveled to Africa and returned to Havana, Cuba with 229 slaves on board. This trading voyage led to a trial of Brown in 1796 for violating the statute. Brown became the first American tried in federal court under the Slave Trade Act of 1794. He was acquitted but did not get back his forfeited ship.

== See also ==
- List of George Washington articles
- Slave Trade Acts
- Slave Trade Act of 1800
