= Act Prohibiting Importation of Slaves =

US Congressional Act of 1807

- Long title: An Act to prohibit the importation of slaves, into any port or place within the jurisdiction of the United States, from and after the first day of January, in the year of our Lord, One Thousand Eight Hundred and Eight.
- Enacted by: the 9th United States Congress
- Effective: January 1, 1808

Citations
- Public law: Pub. L. 9–22
- Statutes at Large: 2 Stat. 426, Chap. 22

Legislative history
- Introduced in the Senate as S. 41 by James Turner (D-R–NC); Passed the Senate on December 17, 1805 (16-11); Passed the House on February 13, 1807 (113-5); Signed into law by President Thomas Jefferson on March 2, 1807

United States Supreme Court cases
- The Emily and the Caroline

The Act Prohibiting Importation of Slaves of 1807 (2 Stat. 426, enacted March 2, 1807) is a United States federal law that prohibits the importation of slaves into the United States. It took effect on January 1, 1808, the earliest date permitted by the United States Constitution.

This legislation was promoted by President Thomas Jefferson, who called for its enactment in his 1806 State of the Union address. He and others had promoted the idea since the 1770s. It reflected the general trend toward abolishing the international slave trade, which Virginia, followed by all the other states, had prohibited or restricted since then (South Carolina, however, had reopened its trade). Congress first regulated against the trade in the Slave Trade Act of 1794, which made it illegal for American ships to participate in the trade. The 1807 law took matters further by criminalizing all importation from abroad, even on foreign ships.

The domestic slave trade within the United States was not affected by the 1807 law. Indeed, with the legal supply of imported slaves terminated, the domestic trade increased in importance. In addition, some smuggling of slaves persisted.

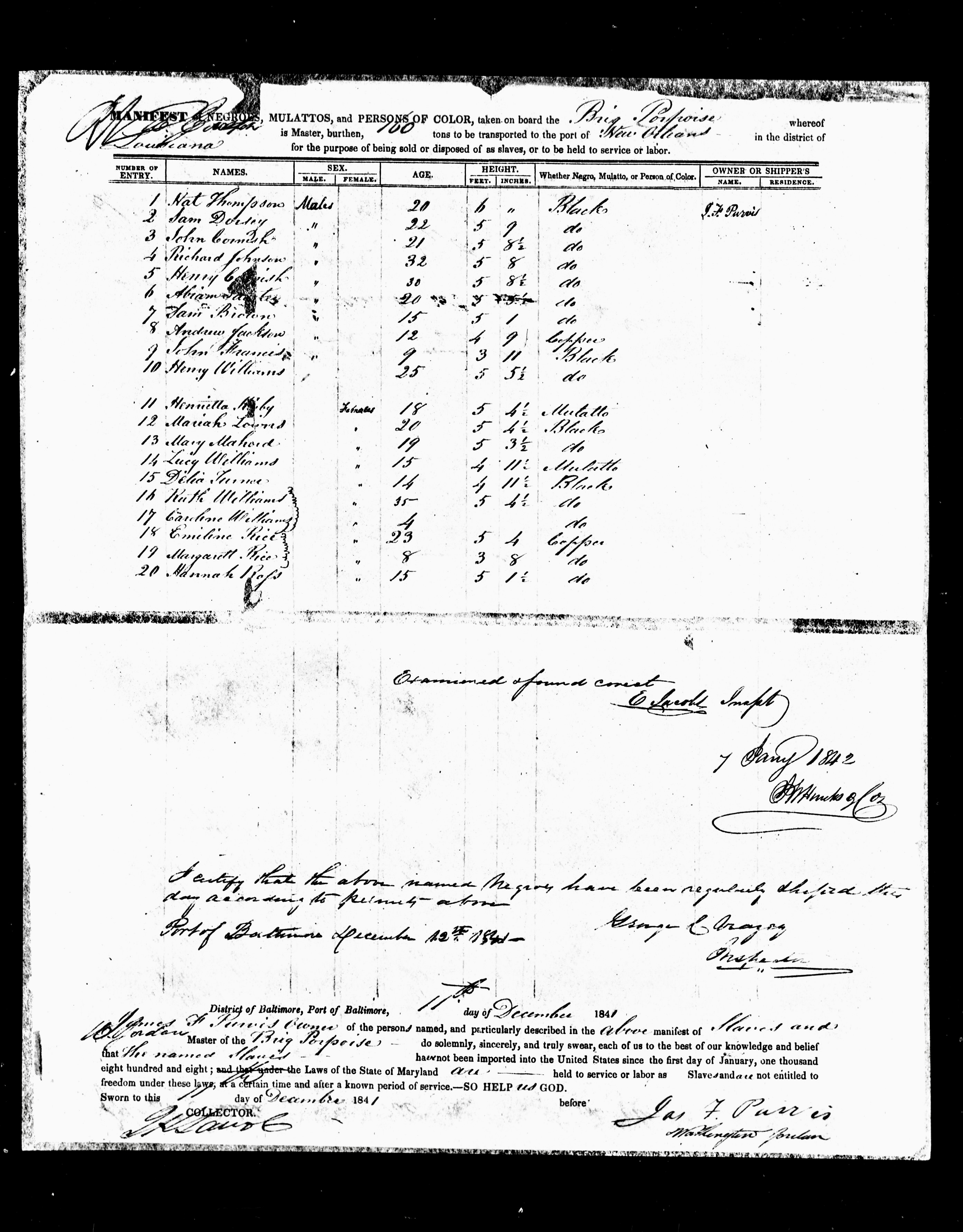
Manifest of the coastwise slaver brig Porpoise, departing Baltimore for New Orleans in 1841, with all parties attesting that none of the enslaved people aboard had been "imported into the United States since the first day of January, one thousand eight hundred and eight"

== Background ==
The Act affected only the import or export of slaves, and did not affect the internal trade in states or between states. During the American Revolution, all of the Thirteen Colonies prohibited their involvement in the international slave trade (some also internally abolished slavery), but three states later reopened the international slave trade (North Carolina banned slave imports in 1794, and strengthened the law in 1795. Georgia received transatlantic slave ships until 1798. South Carolina reopened the transatlantic slave trade in December 1803 and imported 39,075 enslaved people of African descent between 1804 and 1808). Article 1 Section 9 of the United States Constitution protected a state's involvement in the Atlantic slave trade for twenty years from federal prohibition. Article 5 said that this clause could not be affected by constitutional amendment. Only starting on January 1, 1808, could there be a federal law to abolish the international slave trade in all states, although individual states could and did ban it before such time.

The Migration or Importation of such Persons as any of the States now existing shall think proper to admit, shall not be prohibited by the Congress prior to the Year one thousand eight hundred and eight, but a tax or duty may be imposed on such Importation, not exceeding ten dollars for each Person.

By 1775, Africans both free and enslaved made up 20% of the population in the Thirteen Colonies, which made them the second-largest ethnic group after English Americans. In 1774, the influential, revolutionary Fairfax Resolves, called for an end to the "wicked, cruel, and unnatural" Atlantic slave trade. During the Revolutionary War, the United Colonies all pledged to ban their involvement in the transatlantic slave trade. This was done for a variety of economic, political, and moral reasons depending on the colony. After the American victory in 1783, South Carolina reopened its involvement in the slave trade until prohibiting it again in 1787, but then reopened it in 1803; while North Carolina allowed the trade beginning after the Treaty of Paris (1783) until abolishing its involvement in slave trading in 1794; and Georgia allowed the slave trade between 1783, until it closed its international trade in 1798. By 1807, only South Carolina allowed the Atlantic slave trade.

On March 22, 1794, Congress passed the Slave Trade Act of 1794, which prohibited making, loading, outfitting, equipping or dispatching of any ship to be used in the trade of slaves, essentially limiting the trade to foreign ships. On August 5, 1797, John Brown of Providence, Rhode Island became the first American to be tried in federal court under the 1794 law. Brown was convicted and was forced to forfeit his ship Hope. In the 1798 act creating the Mississippi Territory, Congress allowed slaves to be transferred from the rest of the United States to Mississippi Territory, and exempted the territory from the part of the 1787 Northwest Ordinance that abolished slavery in the Northwest Territory (modern-day Midwest) after 1800. However, the same act also abolished the importation of slaves to the Mississippi Territory from "foreign parts" (foreign nations). The penalty for illegally importing slaves from abroad to the territory was a fine of $300. In the Slave Trade Act of 1800, Congress outlawed U.S. citizens' investment in the trade and the employment of U.S. citizens on ships involved in the trade.

== Passage of the Act ==
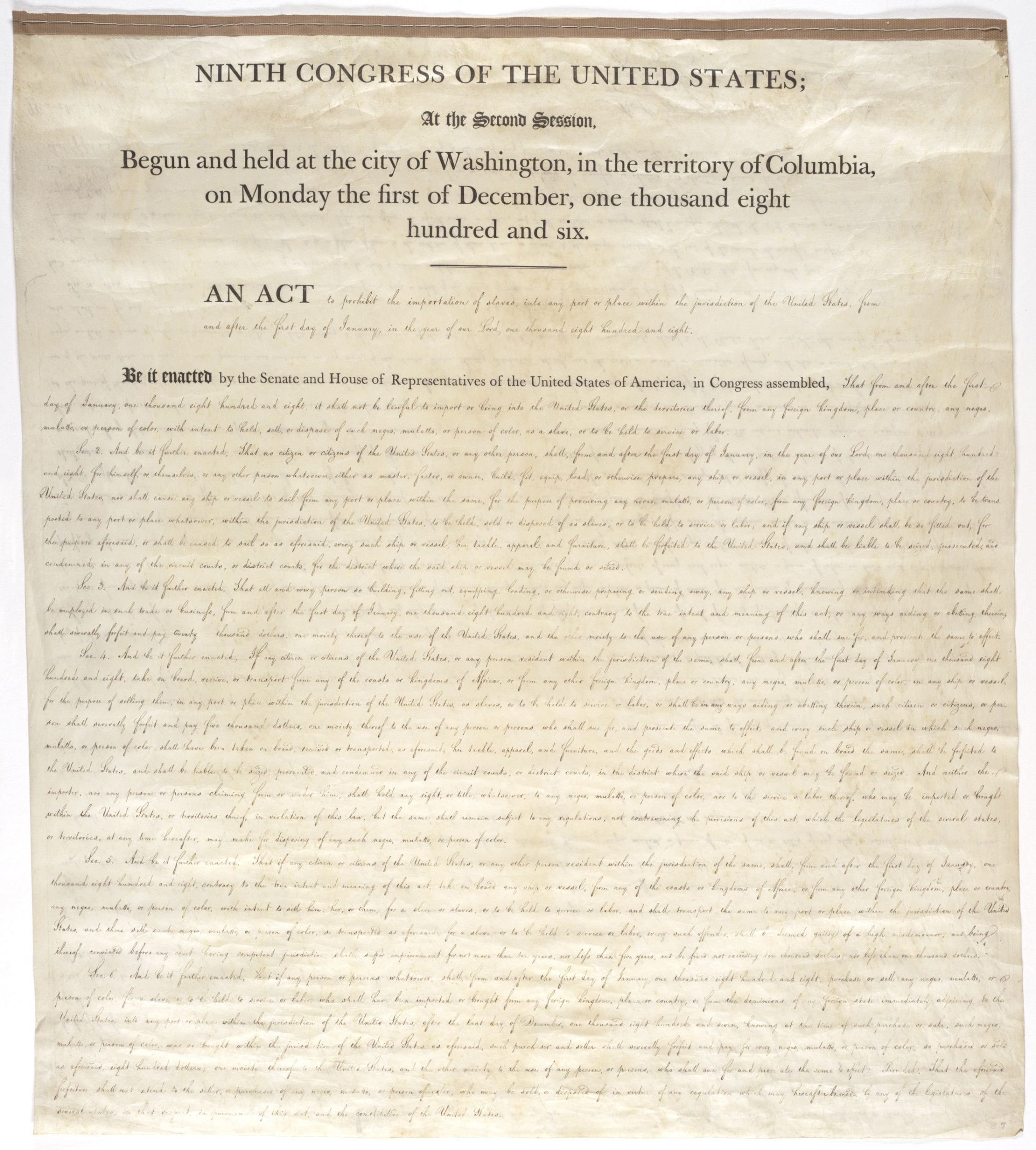
An Act to Prohibit the Importation of Slaves into Any Port or Place Within the Jurisdiction of the U.S. From and After Jan. 1, 1808 (NAID 7873517)

On March 3, 1805, Joseph Bradley Varnum submitted a Massachusetts Proposition to amend the Constitution and Abolish the Slave Trade. This proposition was tabled until 1807.

On December 2, 1806, in his annual message to Congress, widely reprinted in most newspapers, President Thomas Jefferson denounced the "violations of human rights." He said:

I congratulate you, fellow-citizens, on the approach of the period at which you may interpose your authority constitutionally, to withdraw the citizens of the United States from all further participation in those violations of human rights which have been so long continued on the unoffending inhabitants of Africa, and which the morality, the reputation, and the best interests of our country, have long been eager to proscribe.

Under Varnum's leadership, legislation moved through Congress and passed both houses on March 2, 1807. The House and Senate agreed on a bill, approved on March 2, 1807, called An Act to prohibit the importation of slaves into any port or place within the jurisdiction of the United States, from and after the first day of January, in the year of our Lord, One Thousand Eight Hundred and Eight. The measure also regulated the coastwise slave trade. President Thomas Jefferson signed the bill into law on March 2, 1807. Many in Congress believed the act would doom slavery in the South, but they were mistaken.

The role of the Navy was expanded to include patrols off the coasts of Cuba and South America. The effective date of the Act, January 1, 1808, was celebrated by Peter Williams, Jr., in "An Oration on the Abolition of the Slave Trade" delivered in New York City.

== Effectiveness and prosecutions for slaving ==
While there are no exact figures known, historians estimate that up to 50,000 slaves were illegally imported into the United States after 1808, mostly through Spanish Florida and Texas, before those states were admitted to the Union. However, South Carolina Governor Henry Middleton estimated in 1819 that 13,000 smuggled African slaves arrived every year.

Carl C. Cutler's book on American clippers records:

The act outlawing the slave trade in 1808 furnished another source of demand for fast vessels, and for another half century ships continued to be fitted out and financed in this trade by many a respectable citizen in the majority of American ports. Newspapers of the fifties contain occasional references to the number of ships sailing from the various cities in this traffic. One account stated that as late as 1859 there were seven slavers regularly fitted out in New York, and many more in all the larger ports.

In 1820, slave trading became a capital offense with an amendment to the 1819 Act to Protect the Commerce of the United States and Punish the Crime of Piracy. A total of 74 cases of slaving were brought in the United States between 1837 and 1860, "but few captains had been convicted, and those had received trifling sentences, which they had usually been able to avoid". Nathaniel Gordon, who was hanged in 1862, was the only person to be executed for illegal slave-trading in the United States.

In addition, after the 1808 abolition of the slave trade to the United States, many Americans continued to engage in the slave trade by transporting Africans to Cuba. From 1808 to 1860, almost one-third of all slave ships either were owned by American merchants or were built and outfitted in American ports. It is possible that U.S. citizens "may have transported twice as many Africans to other countries such as Cuba and Brazil as they did to their own ports".

The U.S. Navy was slow to institute anti-slaving patrols off the slave ports of Africa—it was not until the 1820 legislation that authority was given to the president to use naval vessels for this task. Even then, enforcement activity was sporadic and largely ineffective. The U.S. position meant that many slave ships from other countries falsely flew the American flag to avoid being seized by British anti-slaving patrols. The first U.S. warship sent to the African coast to intercept U.S. vessels operating in the illegal trade was the USS Cyane. A total of five U.S. Navy ships were on station there in 1820 and 1821, arresting 11 American slavers. No further U.S. anti-slaving patrols were carried out until 1842, and then with limited effectiveness due to political pressure from the slave-owning states. The Atlantic slave trade was not ended until the U.S. Civil War, when American-built and -managed ships were prevented from operating.

== Antebellum proposals by Fire-Eaters to reopen ==
In the South, the Fire-Eaters—antebellum pro-slavery extremists—proposed repealing the act and once more legalizing the international slave trade in the United States. Historian Erskine Clarke writes that this call "was a shameless expression of their contempt for any antislavery sentiment and a part of their stratagem to divide the nation and create a slaveholding confederacy. Among other things, the Fire-Eaters hoped that a reopened international slave trade would incense the North, and that Northern outrage would cause white Southerns to unite and move toward secession."

In addition to whipping up sectional tensions, Fire-Eaters advocated the reopening of the slave trade in order to drive down the price of slaves; to balance the millions of European immigrants who had settled in the North and maintain Southern representation in Congress; and assert the morality of slavery: "Slave trading had to be made right, otherwise slavery was imperiled." Fire-Eaters essentially desired to "legitimize the slave trade in order to make the point that both slavery and the African slave trade were morally acceptable practices"—a view intended to be precisely opposite that of the abolitionists, who affirmed the immorality of both slavery and the slave trade. The view alarmed even pro-slavery figures, such as former President John Tyler, who in retirement wrote a widely republished letter condemning the Fire-Eaters' call to abrogate Article 8 of the Webster–Ashburton Treaty (which barred the slave trade). Tyler noted that the South had voted to ratify the treaty.

Slavery and the cotton economy boomed during the 1850s, and cotton prices were resurgent after a decline in the 1840s. This, in turn, drove up the price of slaves, which led to further pressure to re-open the slave trade to meet demand or bring down prices. Not all Southerners felt this way, however, as the high price of slaves benefitted slave owners and slave merchants. But the general sentiment called for a re-opening of the trade as a logical extension of the support for slavery. Southerners reasoned that, if slavery was good, then putting more people into slavery must also be good, and that, if trading slaves in the South was okay, then trading them from Africa must also be okay. Conventions of Southern planters repeatedly called for the trade to re-open. This, of course, was a non-starter in Congress. There were also attempts from state legislatures to allow the importation of "apprentices" from Africa, but without success. When trying to repeal the slave act failed, some turned to simply ignoring it. Notable cases during the 1850s included slaves smuggled aboard the Wanderer and the Clotilda.

== See also ==
- Abolitionism in the United States
- Act to Protect the Commerce of the United States and Punish the Crime of Piracy (1820)
- Blockade of Africa
- Slave Trade Act 1807 (equivalent British act of Parliament)
- Prohibition of the Black Slave Trade (equivalent Ottoman law)
- Slave Trade Acts
- Slavery in international law
- Post-1808 importation of slaves to the United States
