= Southern strategy =

20th-century Republican electoral strategy for the Southern US

The Southern United States as defined by the Census Bureau

In American politics, the Southern strategy was a Republican Party electoral strategy to increase political support among white voters in the South by appealing to racism against African Americans. (Note: Many sources consistently describe racial appeals to white southerners against blacks as the primary force behind the southern strategy.) As the civil rights movement and dismantling of Jim Crow laws in the 1950s and 1960s visibly deepened existing racial tensions in much of the Southern United States, Republican politicians such as presidential candidates Richard Nixon and Barry Goldwater developed strategies that successfully contributed to the political realignment of many white, conservative voters in the South who had traditionally supported the Democratic Party so consistently that the voting pattern was named the Solid South. The strategy also helped to push the Republican Party much more to the right. By winning all of the South, a presidential candidate could obtain the presidency with minimal support elsewhere.

The phrase "Southern strategy" refers primarily to "top down" narratives of the political realignment of the South which suggest that Republican leaders consciously appealed to many white Southerners' racial grievances to gain their support. This top-down narrative of the Southern Strategy is generally believed to be the primary force that transformed Southern politics following the civil rights era. The scholarly consensus is that racial conservatism was critical in the post–Civil Rights Act realignment of the Republican and Democratic parties, though several aspects of this view have been debated by historians and political scientists.

The perception that the Republican Party had served as the "vehicle of white supremacy in the South", particularly during the Goldwater campaign and the presidential elections of 1968 and 1972, made it difficult for the Republican Party to win back the support of black voters in the South in later years. In 2005, Republican National Committee chairman Ken Mehlman formally apologized to the National Association for the Advancement of Colored People (NAACP) on behalf of the party for its historical exploitation of racial polarization to win elections and for ignoring the black vote.

== Introduction ==
Although the phrase "Southern Strategy" is often attributed to Nixon's political strategist Kevin Phillips, he did not originate it but popularized it. In an interview included in a 1970 New York Times article, Phillips stated his analysis based on studies of ethnic voting:

From now on, the Republicans are never going to get more than 10 to 20 percent of the Negro vote and they don't need any more than that... but Republicans would be shortsighted if they weakened enforcement of the Voting Rights Act. The more Negroes who register as Democrats in the South, the sooner the Negrophobe whites will quit the Democrats and become Republicans. That's where the votes are. Without that prodding from the blacks, the whites will backslide into their old comfortable arrangement with the local Democrats.

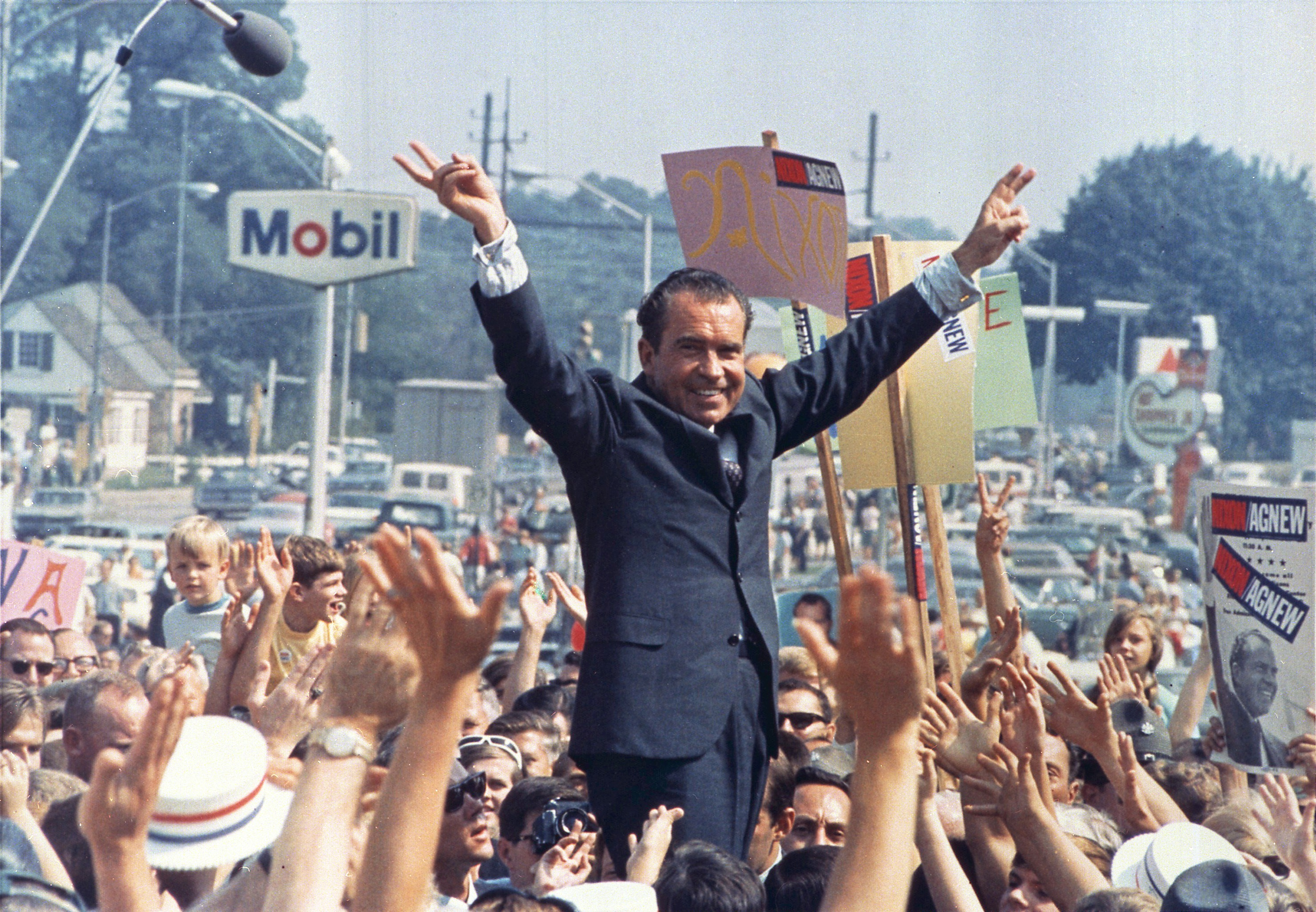
Richard Nixon campaigning in 1968

While Phillips sought to increase Republican power by polarizing ethnic voting in general, and not just to win the white South, the South was by far the biggest prize yielded by his approach. Its success began at the presidential level. Gradually, Southern voters began to elect Republicans to Congress and finally to statewide and local offices, particularly as some legacy segregationist Democrats, such as Strom Thurmond, retired or switched to the GOP. In addition, the Republican Party worked for years to develop grassroots political organizations across the South, supporting candidates for local school boards and city and county offices as examples, but following the Watergate scandal Southern voters came out in support for the "favorite son" candidate, Southern Democrat Jimmy Carter.

From 1948 to 1984, the Southern states, for decades a stronghold for the Democrats, became key swing states, providing the popular vote margins in the 1960, 1968 and 1976 elections. During this era, several Republican candidates expressed support for states' rights, a reversal of the position held by Republicans since the Civil War. Some political analysts said this term was used in the 20th century as a "code word" to represent opposition to federal enforcement of civil rights for blacks and to federal intervention on their behalf; many individual southerners had opposed passage of the Voting Rights Act.

== Background ==
=== Reconstruction to Solid South ===
During Reconstruction, the Republican Party built up its base across the South and controlled each state except Virginia, but from a national perspective, the Republicans gave priority to its much better established Northern state operations. Southerners distrusted the scalawags, found the carpetbaggers distasteful, and lacked respect for the black component of their Republican Party in the South. Richard Abbott says that national Republicans always "stressed building their Northern base rather than extending their party into the South, and whenever the Northern and Southern needs conflicted the latter always lost". In 1868, the GOP spent only 5% of its war chest in the South. Ulysses S. Grant was reelected and the New York Tribune advised it was now time for Southern Republicans to "root, hog, or die!" (that is, to take care of themselves).

During the 1876 United States presidential election, the Republican ticket of Rutherford B. Hayes and William A. Wheeler (later known as members of the comparably liberal "Half-Breed" faction) abandoned the party's pro-civil rights efforts of Reconstruction and made conciliatory tones to the South in the form of appeals to old Southern Whigs.

1920 presidential election map showing Democrat James M. Cox winning only the Solid South and Republican Warren G. Harding prevailing in the electoral college. From the time of Reconstruction until the Civil Rights Era, the Southern states consistently supported the Democratic candidate for president.

In a series of compromises, such as the Compromise of 1877, the Republicans withdrew military forces that had propped up their last three state governors and in return gained the presidency for Hayes. All the southern states were now under the control of the Democrats, who increased their control of virtually all aspects of politics in the ex-Confederate states during the ensuing decades. There were occasional pockets of Republican control, but they were usually in remote mountain districts.

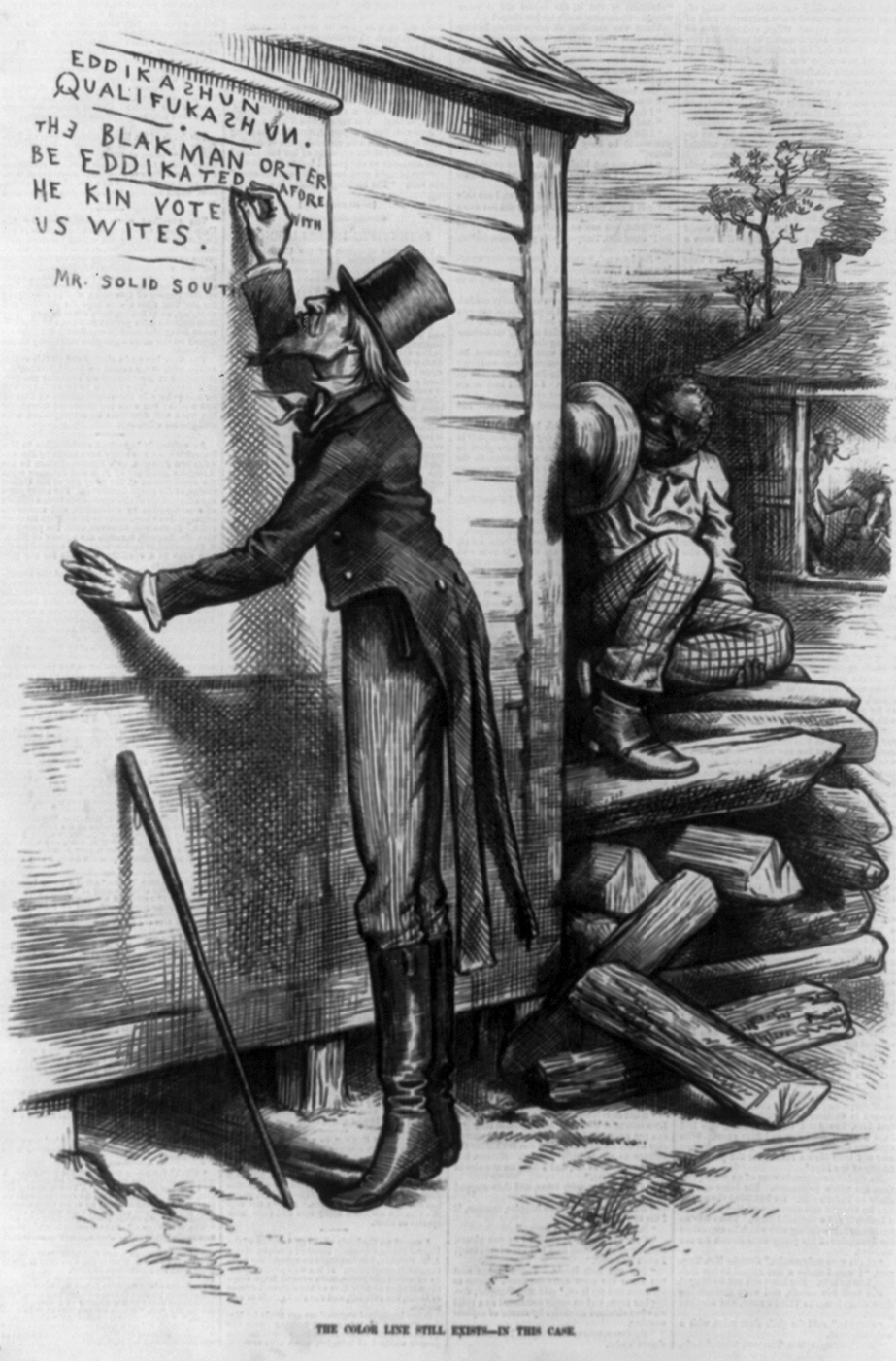
Editorial cartoon by Thomas Nast from the January 18, 1879 issue of Harper's Weekly criticizing the use of literacy tests. It shows "Mr. Solid South" writing on the wall: "Eddikashun qualifukashun. The Blak man orter be eddikated afore he kin vote with us Wites." The Republican Nast often satirized the Democratic Party by caricaturing its adherents as poor, ignorant, and violent.

After 1890, the white Democrats used a variety of tactics to reduce voting by African Americans and poor whites. The rise of primaries in the electoral system allowed for the 15th Amendment to be circumvented using a white primary. Winning the Democratic primary was tantamount to winning the election during the period of the solid south. From 1890 to 1908, the white Democratic legislatures in every Southern state enacted new constitutions or amendments with provisions to disenfranchise most blacks and tens of thousands of poor whites. Provisions required payment of poll taxes, complicated residency, literacy tests and other requirements which were subjectively applied against blacks. As blacks lost their vote, the Republican Party lost its ability to effectively compete in the South.

Because blacks were closed out of elected offices, the South's congressional delegations and state governments were dominated by white Democrats until the 1980s or later. Effectively, Southern white Democrats controlled all the votes of the expanded population by which congressional apportionment was figured. Many of their representatives achieved powerful positions of seniority in Congress, giving them control of chairmanships of significant congressional committees. Although the Fourteenth Amendment has a provision to reduce the congressional representation of states that denied votes to their adult male citizens, this provision was never enforced. As African Americans could not be voters, they were also prevented from being jurors and serving in local offices. Services and institutions for them in the segregated South were chronically underfunded by state and local governments, from which they were excluded.

Republicans rarely held seats in the U.S. House from the South during the Solid South period with the party only holding two seats in Tennessee between 1947 and 1952, out of the 105 seats in the south. Republicans won 80 of 2,565 congressional elections in the south during the first half of the 20th century. Between 1902 and 1950, all US Senators from the south were Democrats. Republicans held around 3% of state legislative seats in the south in 1948, and held zero seats in five states.

Between 1880 and 1904, Republican presidential candidates in the South received 35–40% of that section's vote (except in 1892, when the 16% for the Populists lowered Republicans down to 25%). From 1904 to 1948, Republicans received more than 30% of the section's votes only in the 1920 (35.2%, carrying Tennessee) and 1928 elections (47.7%, carrying five states) after disenfranchisement.

During this period, Republican administrations appointed blacks to political positions. Republicans regularly supported anti-lynching bills, but these were filibustered by Southern Democrats in the Senate. In the 1928 election, the Republican candidate Herbert Hoover rode the issues of prohibition and anti-Catholicism to carry five former Confederate states, with 62 of the 126 electoral votes of the section. After his victory, Hoover attempted to build up the Republican Party of the South, transferring his limited patronage away from blacks and toward the same kind of white Protestant businessmen who made up the core of the Northern Republican Party. With the onset of the Great Depression, which severely affected the South, Hoover soon became extremely unpopular. The gains of the Republican Party in the South were lost. In the 1932 election, Hoover received only 18.1% of the Southern vote for re-election.

From 1860 and 1930, the Republicans controlled the U.S. Senate in thirty-one of thirty-six sessions and the U.S. House in twenty-three sessions. Between 1932 and 1992, the Republicans controlled the U.S. Senate for five out of thirty-one sessions and the U.S. House for two sessions.

=== Internal Republican politics ===
According to Boris Heersink and Jeffery A. Jenkins, blacks did have a voice in the Republican Party, especially in the choice of presidential candidates at the national convention. They argue that in 1880–1928 Republican leaders at the presidential level adopted a "Southern Strategy" by "investing heavily in maintaining a minor party organization in the South as a way to create a reliable voting base at conventions", causing federal patronage to go to Southern blacks as long as there was a Republican in the White House.

Southern states sent delegations to Republican conventions that accounted for one-fourth of the overall number despite the Democratic dominance of the region. These delegates were viewed as rotten boroughs and gave their support to the incumbent or the frontrunner. Mark Hanna started to lobby southern Republicans in favor of William McKinley in 1895, and McKinley came to the 1896 Republican National Convention with control of all of the southern delegations, which accounted for almost half of the votes required to win, except for Texas. The issue of southern delegates exploded in 1912, when William Howard Taft used his 83% control of Southern delegations to defeat Theodore Roosevelt at the convention. Delegate allocation by state was altered after this election to be based on how well the party did electorally in those states. Southern delegate sizes fell from 23% of the total delegates in 1912, to 18% in 1916.

The mixed-race Black-and-tan faction's control of Republican parties in the south was ended by the Lily-white movement and according to V. O. Key Jr. by 1949, black Republicans only held power in the Mississippi affiliate. Alabama, Arkansas, North Carolina, Texas, and Virginia sent entirely white delegations to the 1920 convention. The Georgia Republican Party was restructured in 1921, with Warren G. Harding's involvement, as a model for other southern states and this restructuring replaced the black majority state committee with one that only had two black members. Texas sent its first entirely white delegate in 1928. At the 1964 convention the Georgia delegation was entirely white for the first time in fifty years.

G. Alexander Heard stated that "the southern oligarchies have greatly bolstered the conservative wing of the Republican party". Eisenhower's victories in southern states increased their delegation sizes to account for 21% of the total delegates at the 1956 convention, the highest since the rule change. By 1964, a candidate that could unify delegations from the west and south would hold four-fifths of the required number of delegates for the nomination, taking power away from more liberal Republicans in the northeast. 270 of the 279 southern delegates gave their support to Barry Goldwater, 31% of his overall support.

=== World War II and population changes ===
In 1932, less than 10% of the voting population in the peripheral south and less than 20% in the deep south lived in metropolitan areas. By 1956, metropolitan areas accounted for less than 40% and 30% respectively. This rose to around 60% and 40% respectively by 1976. Florida became the first urbanized state in the south in the 1930s. Republicans, such as John Tower and Howard Baker, performed well in these urban areas.

The President's Committee on Civil Rights, organized by Truman, published To Secure These Rights: The Report of the President's Committee on Civil Rights in 1947. This report recommended the passage of civil rights legislation and ending segregation. The southern delegates planned on conducting a walkout during the roll call vote on the party's platform, which included support for civil rights, but Sam Rayburn, chair of the convention, instead used a voice vote as he believed a walkout would ruin Truman's presidential campaign. Only 35 of the 278 southern delegates, thirteen from Alabama and the entire twenty-two member Mississippi delegation, left the convention on July 15. The remaining southern delegates gave their support to Senator Richard Russell Jr. on the presidential ballot.

The States' Rights Democratic Party (Dixiecrats) met in Birmingham, Alabama, and nominated Strom Thurmond and Fielding L. Wright as its presidential ticket. The party supported racial segregation, poll taxes, and opposed anti-lynching legislation. They planned on winning the entirety of the south's 127 electoral votes in order to force a contingent election in the US House of Representatives. Thurmond ran using the Democratic ballot line in Alabama, Louisiana, Mississippi, and South Carolina. The Dixiecrats were unsuccessful as Truman won reelection and they only received 39 of the south's electoral votes, only winning in states without Truman on the ballot. Failing to deny the Democrats the presidency in 1948, soon dissolved, but the split lingered. Truman was the last Democratic presidential nominee to win a majority of the white vote in the south.

In addition to the splits in the Democratic Party, the population movements associated with World War II had a significant effect in changing the demographics of the South. Starting during World War II, lasting from 1940 to 1970, more than 5 million African-Americans moved from the rural South to medium and major Northern industrial cities as well as mainly coastal munitions centers of the West during the Second Great Migration for jobs in the defense industry and later economic opportunities during the post-World War II economic boom.

In 1876, over 70% of voters participated in the election, but voter turnout declined to less than 60% by 1896, and less than 30% by 1904. Voter participation reached a low of below 20% in the 1924 election. Increase voting rights in the 1950s and 1960s raised participation to 38% in 1952, and around 51% in 1968, the first time since 1896 that a majority voted. The percentage of black southerners who were registered to vote rose from around 20% in 1952, to 43% in 1964, and a majority in 1968.

With control of powerful committees, Southern Democrats gained new federal military installations in the South and other federal investments during and after the war. Changes in industry and growth in universities and the military establishment in turn attracted Northern transplants to the South and bolstered the base of the Republican Party. In the post-war presidential campaigns, Republicans did best in those fastest-growing states of the South that had the most Northern transplants. In the 1952, 1956 and 1960 elections, Virginia, Tennessee and Florida went Republican while Louisiana went Republican in 1956 and Texas twice voted for Dwight D. Eisenhower and once for John F. Kennedy. In 1956, Eisenhower received 48.9% of the Southern vote, becoming only the second Republican in history (after Ulysses S. Grant) to get a plurality of Southern votes. The 1956 election was the first time since 1872 that the Democratic presidential nominee failed to win a majority of the south's electoral votes.

The white conservative voters of the states of the Deep South remained loyal to the Democratic Party, which had not officially repudiated segregation. Due to declines in population or smaller rates of growth compared to other states, Mississippi, Alabama, Arkansas, and North Carolina lost congressional seats from the 1950s to the 1970s while South Carolina, Louisiana and Georgia remained static. Eisenhower was elected president in 1952, with strong support from the emerging middle class suburban element in the South. He appointed a number of Southern Republican supporters as federal judges in the South. They in turn ordered the desegregation of Southern schools in the 1950s and 1960s. They included Fifth Circuit Court of Appeals judges John R. Brown, Elbert P. Tuttle and John Minor Wisdom as well as district judges Frank Johnson and J. Skelly Wright. Five of Eisenhower's 24 appointees supported segregation.

== Roots (1950s–1972) ==
=== Eisenhower and Kennedy ===
In the 1952 United States presidential election, Eisenhower placed first in 39 southern congressional districts, four in the Deep South. Only six Republicans were elected to the US House from the south, with five of them representing districts within the Blue Ridge Mountains. The Republicans made a net gain of one seat in the 1954 election, but did not win any additional seats for the rest of the decade. There were only 15 Republican candidates for the US House in the entirety of the South in 1958.

Tower's victory over interim appointee William A. Blakley in the 1961 United States Senate special election in Texas was made possible by a split among Democrats and a lack of liberal support for the conservative Blakley. This win made Tower the first Republican elected to the US Senate from the south since the end of Reconstruction. In the senate, he voted with southern Democrats in opposition to civil rights legislation. Tower was succeeded by Phil Gramm, a Republican who left the Democratic Party. The Democrats maintained control of Texas' other senate seat until 1993.

=== 1964 election ===
In the early 1960s, leading Republicans including Goldwater began advocating for a plan they called the 'Southern Strategy', an effort to make Republican gains in the Solid South, which had been pro-Democratic since the aftermath of the American Civil War. Under the Southern Strategy, Republicans would continue an earlier effort to make inroads in the South, Operation Dixie, by ending attempts to appeal to African American voters in the Northern states, and instead appeal to white conservative voters in the South. As documented by reporters and columnists, including Joseph Alsop and Arthur Krock, on the surface the Southern Strategy would appeal to white voters in the South by advocating against the New Frontier programs of President John F. Kennedy and in favor of a smaller federal government and states' rights, while less publicly arguing against the Civil Rights movement and in favor of continued racial segregation.

Congressman and Republican National Committee chairman William E. Miller concurred with Goldwater and backed the Southern Strategy, including holding private meetings of the RNC and other key Republican leaders in late 1962 and early 1963 so they could decide whether to implement it. Overruling the moderate and liberal wings of the party, its leadership decided to pursue the Southern Strategy for the 1964 elections and beyond.

1964 presidential candidate Barry Goldwater won his home state of Arizona and five states in the Deep South, depicted in red. The Southern states, traditionally Democratic up to that time, voted Republican primarily as a statement of opposition to the Civil Rights Act, which had been passed in Congress earlier that year. Capturing 61.1% of the popular vote and 486 electors, Johnson won in a landslide.

Many states' rights Democrats were attracted to Goldwater's 1964 presidential campaign. Goldwater was notably more conservative than previous Republican nominees, such as President Eisenhower. Goldwater's principal opponent in the primary election, Governor Nelson Rockefeller of New York, was widely seen as representing the more moderate, pro-Civil Rights Act, Northern wing of the party (see Rockefeller Republican and Goldwater Republican).

In the 1964 presidential election, Goldwater ran a conservative, hawkish campaign that broadly opposed strong action by the federal government. Although he had supported all previous federal civil rights legislation, Goldwater opposed the Civil Rights Act and championed this opposition during the campaign. He believed that this act was an intrusion of the federal government into the affairs of state; and that the Act interfered with the rights of private people to do business, or not, with whomever they chose, even if the choice is based on racial discrimination.

Goldwater's position appealed to white Southern Democrats and Goldwater was the first Republican presidential candidate since Reconstruction to win the electoral votes of the Deep South states (Louisiana, Georgia, Alabama, Mississippi and South Carolina). Outside the South, Goldwater's negative vote on the Civil Rights Act proved devastating to his campaign. The only other state he won was his home one of Arizona and he suffered a landslide defeat. A Lyndon B. Johnson ad called "Confessions of a Republican", which ran in Northern and Western states, associated Goldwater with the Ku Klux Klan (KKK). At the same time, Johnson's campaign in the Deep South publicized Goldwater's support for pre-1964 civil rights legislation. In the end, Johnson swept the election.

In September, Thurmond left the Democratic Party and joined the Republicans. Goldwater gave a televised speech in Columbia, South Carolina, that featured segregationist politicians on-stage with him, including Thurmond, Iris Faircloth Blitch, James F. Byrnes, James H. Gray Sr., Albert Watson, and John Bell Williams, in which he criticized the Civil Rights Act.

If you can convince the lowest white man he's better than the best colored man, he won't notice you're picking his pocket. Hell, give him somebody to look down on, and he'll empty his pockets for you.

— Lyndon Johnson

Goldwater performed well in the Deep South, but fared poorly in other southern states due to his conservative policies. Goldwater was an opponent of the Tennessee Valley Authority and stated that it "was a big fat sacred New Deal cow". He received significant criticism for this statement and later wrote that "You would have thought I had just shot Santa Claus" about the response. Peter O'Donnell, a financial backer of Goldwater's campaign, wrote a memo criticizing Goldwater for "shooting from the hip" and "kicking a sleeping dog". His initial lead in North Carolina was undone by his opposition to federal tobacco price support. He was hurt in Florida due to his desire to privatize Social Security and his criticism of the United States' space program.

At the time, Goldwater was at odds in his position with most of the prominent members of the Republican Party, dominated by so-called Eastern Establishment and Midwestern Progressives. A higher percentage of the Republicans and Democrats outside the South supported the Civil Rights Act of 1964, as they had on all previous Civil Rights legislation. The Southern Democrats mostly opposed the Northern and Western politicians regardless of party affiliation—and their Presidents (Kennedy and Johnson)—on civil rights issues. At the same time, passage of the Civil Rights Act caused many black voters to join the Democratic Party, which moved the party and its nominees in a progressive direction.

=== Nixon ===
==== 1968 election ====
Johnson was concerned that his endorsement of civil rights legislation would endanger his party in the South. In the 1968 election, Richard Nixon saw the cracks in the Solid South as an opportunity to tap into southern voters who had historically been beyond the reach of the Republican Party. George Wallace had exhibited a strong candidacy in that election, where he garnered 46 electoral votes and nearly 10 million popular votes, attracting mostly Southern Democrats away from Hubert Humphrey. Humphrey had the worst performance for a Democratic presidential nominee in the South since the 1868 election.

The notion of Black Power advocated by the Student Nonviolent Coordinating Committee leaders captured some of the frustrations of African Americans at the slow process of change in gaining civil rights and social justice. African Americans pushed for faster change, raising racial tensions. Journalists reporting about the demonstrations against the Vietnam War often featured young people engaging in violence or burning draft cards and American flags. Conservatives were also dismayed about the many young adults engaged in the drug culture and "free love" (sexual promiscuity), in what was called the "hippie" counter-culture. These actions scandalized many Americans and created a concern about law and order.

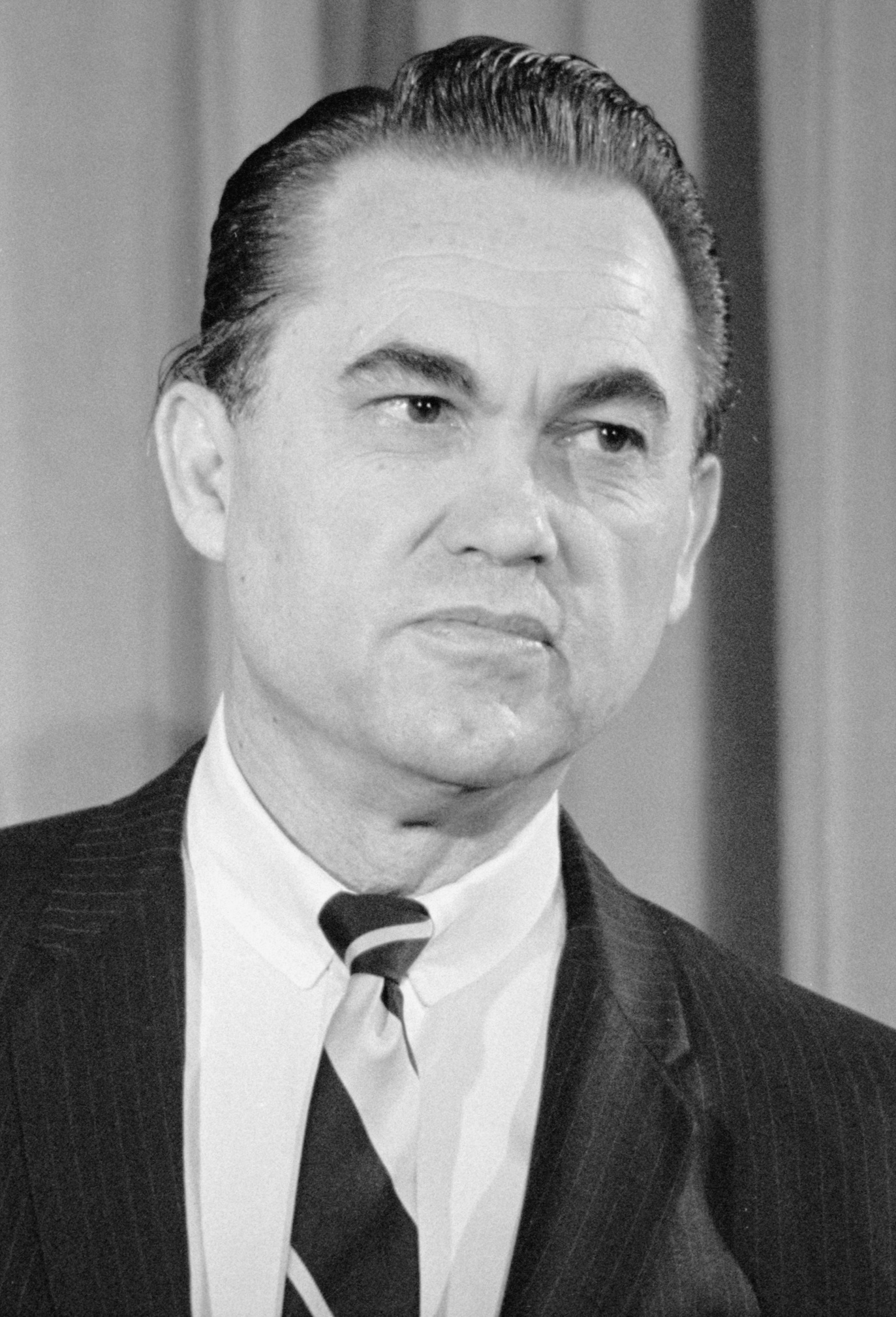
Alabama Governor George Wallace

Nixon's advisers recognized that they could not appeal directly to voters on issues of white supremacy or racism. White House Chief of Staff H. R. Haldeman noted that Nixon "emphasized that you have to face the fact that the whole problem is really the blacks. The key is to devise a system that recognized this while not appearing to". With the aid of Harry Dent and South Carolina Senator Strom Thurmond, who had switched to the Republican Party in 1964, Nixon ran his 1968 campaign on states' rights and "law and order". Liberal Northern Democrats accused Nixon of pandering to Southern whites, especially with regard to his "states' rights" and "law and order" positions, which were widely understood by black leaders to symbolize Southern resistance to civil rights. This tactic was described in 2007 by David Greenberg in Slate as "dog-whistle politics". According to an article in The American Conservative, Nixon adviser and speechwriter Pat Buchanan disputed this characterization.

Nixon met with southern Republicans and party chairmen, including John Tower and Thurmond, on May 31, 1968, in Atlanta, Georgia, and promised to slow integration efforts and forced busing. Ronald Reagan entered the 1968 primary late and attempted to gain the support of the southern delegations, with Nixon stating that "it was Ronald Reagan who set the hearts of many Southern Republicans aflutter", but the delegations had committed to Nixon and Thurmond helped maintain their support for Nixon. Southern delegates accounted for 46% of the delegates needed to win the nomination at the 1968 convention. Nixon received his highest level of support from the south, which gave him 74% of their vote and accounted for 33% of his overall support.

Nixon wrote in his memoir that the south was the most important region for winning both the nomination and the presidency. However, he had to concede the Deep South to Wallace and instead presented himself as a compromise between Wallace and Humphrey to the rest of the south. Nixon's campaign in the south was managed by Harry S. Dent Sr. and Thurmond. Dent had Nixon use euphemisms in opposition to school desegregation and forced busing.

The independent candidacy of George Wallace partially negated Nixon's Southern Strategy. With a much more explicit attack on integration and civil rights, Wallace won almost all of Goldwater's states. Nixon picked up Virginia, Tennessee, North Carolina, South Carolina, and Florida while Democratic nominee Hubert Humphrey won only Texas. Writer Jeffrey Hart, who worked on the Nixon campaign as a speechwriter, said in 2006 that Nixon did not have a "Southern Strategy", but rather a "Border State Strategy" as he said that the 1968 campaign ceded the Deep South to George Wallace. Hart suggested that the press called it a "Southern Strategy" as they are "very lazy".

Nixon won 29% of the white vote in the Deep South compared to Wallace's 63%, but won 45% of the white vote in the peripheral south compared to Wallace's 31% and Humphrey's 24%. Numan V. Bartley and Hugh Davis Graham wrote that Nixon performed best in the metropolitan, urban, and suburban areas of the south where law and order rhetoric appealed better while performing worse in smaller cities and rural areas.

Percentage of white vote won in southern states
State	1964	1968	1972	1976	1980	1984	1988	1996
Alabama	77 / 100 23 / 100	78 / 100 16 / 100 4 / 100	83 / 100 14 / 100	50 / 100 48 / 100	59 / 100 36 / 100	73 / 100 25 / 100	71 / 100 28 / 100	63 / 100 28 / 100 8 / 100
Arkansas	49 / 100 51 / 100	46 / 100 36 / 100 19 / 100	80 / 100 19 / 100	58 / 100 42 / 100	53 / 100 42 / 100	68 / 100 31 / 100	63 / 100 36 / 100	40 / 100 47 / 100 11 / 100
Florida	56 / 100 44 / 100	45 / 100 32 / 100 23 / 100	78 / 100 22 / 100	51 / 100 47 / 100	62 / 100 31 / 100	71 / 100 29 / 100	67 / 100 33 / 100	48 / 100 43 / 100 9 / 100
Georgia	65 / 100 35 / 100	51 / 100 36 / 100 13 / 100	90 / 100 10 / 100	58 / 100 42 / 100	50 / 100 47 / 100	73 / 100 27 / 100	72 / 100 27 / 100	59 / 100 30 / 100 9 / 100
Louisiana	65 / 100 35 / 100	60 / 100 28 / 100 12 / 100	77 / 100 15 / 100	57 / 100 40 / 100	63 / 100 33 / 100	76 / 100 23 / 100	68 / 100 30 / 100	57 / 100 33 / 100 9 / 100
Mississippi	91 / 100 9 / 100	83 / 100 17 / 100 0 / 100	100 / 100 0 / 100	60 / 100 36 / 100	62 / 100 35 / 100	79 / 100 20 / 100	76 / 100 23 / 100	
North Carolina	49 / 100 51 / 100	46 / 100 37 / 100 18 / 100	78 / 100 20 / 100	51 / 100 48 / 100	57 / 100 39 / 100	73 / 100 27 / 100	68 / 100 32 / 100	55 / 100 37 / 100 8 / 100
South Carolina	70 / 100 30 / 100	48 / 100 41 / 100 12 / 100	85 / 100 13 / 100	55 / 100 44 / 100	64 / 100 32 / 100	82 / 100 17 / 100	79 / 100 20 / 100	65 / 100 28 / 100 16 / 100
Tennessee	51 / 100 49 / 100	43 / 100 39 / 100 19 / 100	75 / 100 22 / 100	51 / 100 48 / 100	55 / 100 42 / 100	65 / 100 34 / 100	65 / 100 34 / 100	50 / 100 43 / 100 6 / 100
Texas	44 / 100 56 / 100	45 / 100 34 / 100 22 / 100	73 / 100 26 / 100	53 / 100 46 / 100	59 / 100 37 / 100	70 / 100 30 / 100	61 / 100 38 / 100	61 / 100 31 / 100 6 / 100
Virginia	52 / 100 48 / 100	51 / 100 28 / 100 21 / 100	78 / 100 22 / 100	56 / 100 40 / 100	59 / 100 33 / 100	72 / 100 27 / 100	69 / 100 30 / 100	52 / 100 40 / 100 7 / 100

==== Midterms and 1972 election ====
Glen Moore argues that in 1970 Nixon and the Republican Party developed a "Southern Strategy" for the midterm elections. The strategy involved depicting Democratic candidates as permissive liberals. Republicans thereby managed to unseat Albert Gore, Sr. of Tennessee as well as Senator Joseph D. Tydings of Maryland. However, for the entire region the net result was a small loss of seats for the Republican Party in the South.

Regional attention in 1970 focused on the Senate, when Nixon nominated Judge G. Harrold Carswell of Florida, a judge on the Fifth Circuit Court of Appeals to the Supreme Court. Carswell was a lawyer from north Florida with a mediocre record, but Nixon needed a Southerner and a "strict constructionist" to support his "Southern Strategy" of moving the region toward the GOP. Carswell was voted down by the liberal bloc in the Senate, causing a backlash that pushed many Southern Democrats into the Republican fold. The long-term result was a realization by both parties that nominations to the Supreme Court could have a major impact on political attitudes in the South.

In a year-by-year analysis of how the transformation took place in the critical state of Virginia, James Sweeney shows that the slow collapse of the old statewide Byrd machine gave the Republicans the opportunity to build local organizations county by county and city by city. The Democratic Party factionalized, with each faction having the goal of taking over the entire statewide Byrd machine, but the Byrd leadership was basically conservative and more in line with the national Republican Party in economic and foreign policy issues. Republicans united behind A. Linwood Holton, Jr. in 1969 and swept the state. In the 1970 Senate elections, the Byrd machine made a comeback by electing Independent Harry Flood Byrd, Jr. over Republican Ray L. Garland and Democrat George Rawlings. The new Senator Byrd never joined the Republican Party and instead joined the Democratic caucus. Nevertheless, he had a mostly conservative voting record especially on the trademark Byrd issue of the national deficit. At the local level, the 1970s saw steady Republican growth with this emphasis on a middle-class suburban electorate that had little interest in the historic issues of rural agrarianism and racial segregation.

Nixon won 79% of the southern white vote in the 1972 election, and received 86% of the white vote in the Deep South. CBS reported that Nixon won former Wallace voters three to one. Nixon's highest margins of victory in the national election were in Mississippi and Georgia. It was the first time that a Republican presidential candidate won the entirety of the south.

Jesse Helms, who left the Democratic Party in 1971, was elected to the US Senate from North Carolina. He never supported any civil rights legislation during his tenure. Helms received large amounts of support from white voters and tied himself to Reagan and opposition to Martin Luther King Jr. Day during the 1984 election. His campaign against black Democratic nominee Harvey Gantt in the 1990 election was racially charged as he focused on messaging of black people taking jobs from white people. He ran an advertisement in which a white person was denied a job due to racial quotas. Carter Wrenn, who was involved in the ad's creation, stated that "We played the race card".

Fletcher Thompson, a Republican who opposed busing, ran in the 1972 Georgia senatorial election against conservative Democrat Sam Nunn. Nunn won the election, but was the first Democrat to win a senatorial election in Georgia while losing the white vote.

=== 1976 election ===
Carter, the first major party presidential candidate from the deep south since Zachary Taylor, won every southern state except for Virginia in the 1976 presidential election. Carter's campaign operated on a strategy that was based around winning the south. His campaign manager, Hamilton Jordan, wrote that the south "provided us with a base of support that cannot be taken for granted or jeopardized" as the "Republicans cannot win if they write off the South". However, the campaign did not publicly emphasize the importance of the south with Jordan stating that it would "be harmful nationally if we were perceived as having a South strategy".

Patrick Caddell stated that televisions ads by the Carter campaign in the south "were blatant-waving the bloody rebel flag". To avoid being viewed as a liberal in the south Carter campaigned with Wallace and voice opposition to welfare and support for balanced budgets and national defense. He also campaigned with segregationist senators James Eastland and John C. Stennis.

Ford's poor performance in the south, winning only 9% of its electoral votes, greatly increased the amount of support he needed in the rest of the country to win. However, Carter only won the white vote in Georgia, Arkansas, and Tennessee.

== Evolution (1970s and 1980s) ==
=== Reagan ===
After his accession to the presidency Ford selected Nelson Rockefeller, rather than George H. W. Bush, to serve as his vice president. Bryce Harlow stated that Bush would have been better for party unity, but that Rockefeller would receive better coverage from the media and make Ford a stronger candidate in the 1976 election. Conservatives, including Reagan, opposed the selection as Rockefeller "might inherit the presidency" according to Lou Cannon.

Ford was the first incumbent Republican president to face significant primary opposition since Taft in 1912. Reagan's campaign was performing poorly following defeats in New Hampshire, Florida, and Illinois. In North Carolina, Ford was backed by moderate Governor James Holshouser while Reagan was backed by Helms and Thomas F. Ellis. North Carolina was Reagan's first victory during the 1976 primary and he also won Texas, Alabama, and Georgia. However, he failed to win in Tennessee due to comments suggesting he might not support continuation of the TVA. One-third of Reagan's delegate support at the convention came from the south.

John Sears, Reagan's campaign manager in 1976, proposed that he moderate his policies to prevent being seen as another Goldwater. On the day Reagan won the New Hampshire primary he replaced Sears with William J. Casey, who shifted to more conservative messaging.

Reagan's victories in the south solidified his control of the Republican nomination. Lee Atwater and Carroll A. Campbell Jr. managed his successful campaign in South Carolina despite John Connally having the support of Thurmond and Governor James B. Edwards. Reagan won the entire south with him taking over 60% in North Carolina, over 70% in Alabama, Georgia, Tennessee, and Louisiana, and over 80% in Mississippi.

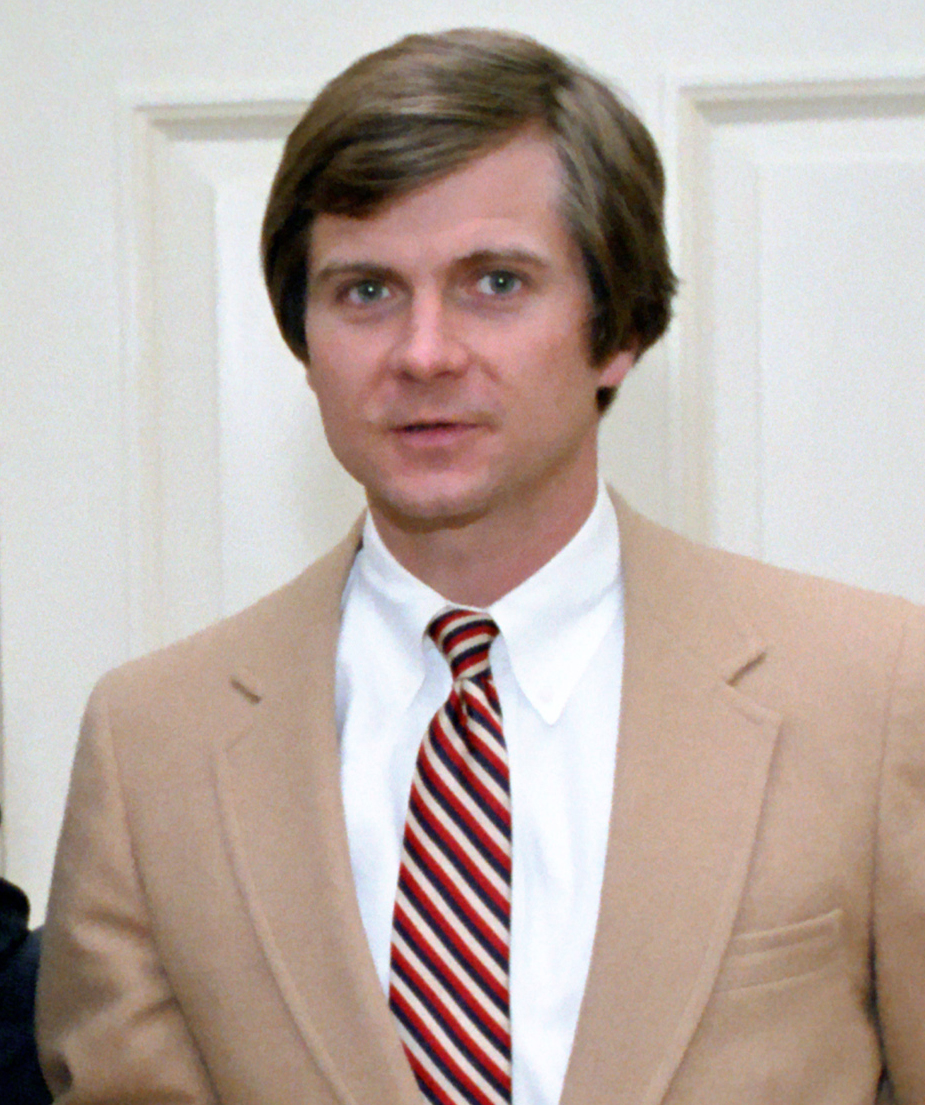
Lee Atwater

As civil rights grew more accepted throughout the nation, basing a general election strategy on appeals to "states' rights", which some would have believed opposed civil rights laws, would have resulted in a national backlash. The concept of "states' rights" was considered by some to be subsumed within a broader meaning than simply a reference to civil rights laws. States rights became seen as encompassing a type of New Federalism that would return local control of race relations. Republican strategist Atwater discussed the Southern Strategy in a 1981 interview later published in Southern Politics in the 1990s by Alexander P. Lamis.

Atwater: As to the whole Southern strategy that Harry Dent and others put together in 1968, opposition to the Voting Rights Act would have been a central part of keeping the South. Now [Reagan] doesn't have to do that. All you have to do to keep the South is for Reagan to run in place on the issues he's campaigned on since 1964 [...] and that's fiscal conservatism, balancing the budget, cut taxes, you know, the whole cluster...

Questioner: But the fact is, isn't it, that Reagan does get to the Wallace voter and to the racist side of the Wallace voter by doing away with legal services, by cutting down on food stamps?

Atwater: Y'all don't quote me on this. You start out in 1954 by saying, "Nigger, nigger, nigger." By 1968 you can't say "nigger"—that hurts you. Backfires. So you say stuff like forced busing, states' rights and all that stuff. You're getting so abstract now [that] you're talking about cutting taxes, and all these things you're talking about are totally economic things and a byproduct of them is [that] blacks get hurt worse than whites. And subconsciously maybe that is part of it. I'm not saying that. But I'm saying that if it is getting that abstract, and that coded, that we are doing away with the racial problem one way or the other. You follow me—because obviously sitting around saying, "We want to cut this," is much more abstract than even the busing thing, and a hell of a lot more abstract than "Nigger, nigger."

From the 1980 to 1988 presidential elections Georgia was the only southern state to support a Democratic presidential candidate. Republicans won US Senate seats in Mississippi and Alabama for the first time since Reconstruction in 1978 and 1980, and a statewide office in Georgia in 1980. Mack Mattingly's victory in the 1980 Georgia senatorial election made him the first Republican to defeat an incumbent Democratic senator in the deep south. Georgia, Kentucky, and Mississippi were the only southern states to not elect a Republican governor in the 1980s. The number of registered Republican voters increased in the south during the 1980s with Louisiana rising from 7% in 1980 to 16% in 1988, North Carolina rising from 24% to 30%, and Florida rising from 30% to 39%.

During the Reagan administration, there was a decline in Republican congressional support in the south. Republicans held 10 of the 22 US Senate seats and 39 seats in the US House of Representatives from the south after the 1980 election, but declined to 7 senate seats while maintaining its representation in the US House of Representatives despite reapportionment increasing the south's seat total by eight. Republicans did not contest one-fourth of the house seats in the south in the 1988 election. Reagan was able to form a governing majority due to a coalition between Republicans and conservative southern Democrats, boll weevils. The Republicans gained four seats in the US Senate from the south in the 1980 election, but three lost reelection in 1986, and one died in office.

Fourteen of the eighteen Democratic senators from the South voted against extending the Voting Rights Act in 1970. However, an increase in newer members led to nine voting to extend it in 1975, while five voted against it. In 1982, all Democratic senators from the South, including Russell B. Long and Stennis, voted to extend the legislation for twenty-five years. Earl Black and Merle Black stated that southern senators Dale Bumpers, Wyche Fowler, Bob Graham, David Pryor, Terry Sanford, and Jim Sasser were voting as or more liberal than the national party in the 1980s.

=== Reagan's Neshoba County Fair "states' rights" speech ===
In August 1980, Reagan made a much-noted appearance at the Neshoba County Fair in Philadelphia, Mississippi, where his speech contained the phrase "I believe in states' rights". (Note: Quoted from Reagan's speech: "I still believe the answer to any problem lies with the people. I believe in states' rights and I believe in people doing as much as they can for themselves at the community level and at the private level. I believe we have distorted the balance of our government today by giving powers that were never intended to be given in the Constitution to that federal establishment". "Sound file". Onlinemadison.com. Archived from the original (MP3) on March 4, 2016.) This was cited as evidence that the Republican Party was building upon the Southern strategy again however contemporary reporting suggested Reagan was eschewing a Southern Strategy. Former UN Ambassador Andrew Young stated that with his support of states' rights, Reagan was signaling that "it's going to be all right to kill niggers when [Reagan is] president." Young's remark was criticized by Carter. According to Dominic Philip Barker there was a greater outrage at the charges made against Reagan at the time rather than his statement with Carter saying "that he did not believe his Republican opponent was "a racist in any degree"" but insisted "that Mr. Reagan had injected certain "code words" into the campaign that would be better left unsaid." Two days after his appearance at the fair, Reagan appeared at the Urban League convention in New York to appeal to black voters, where he said, "I am committed to the protection and enforcement of the civil rights of black Americans. This commitment is interwoven into every phase of the plans I will propose."

Reagan's campaigns used racially coded rhetoric, making attacks on the "welfare state" and leveraging resentment towards affirmative action. Dan Carter explains how "Reagan showed that he could use coded language with the best of them, lambasting welfare queens, busing, and affirmative action as the need arose". During his 1976 and 1980 campaigns, Reagan employed stereotypes of welfare recipients, often invoking the case of a "welfare queen" with a large house and a Cadillac using multiple names to collect over $150,000 in tax-free income. Aistrup described Reagan's campaign statements as "seemingly race neutral", but explained how whites interpret this in a racial manner, citing a Democratic National Committee funded study conducted by Communications Research Group. Though Reagan did not overtly mention the race of the welfare recipient, the unstated impression in whites' minds were black people and Reagan's rhetoric resonated with Southern white perceptions of black people.

Aistrup argued that one example of Reagan field-testing coded language in the South was a reference to an unscrupulous man using food stamps as a "strapping young buck". When informed of the offensive connotations of the term, Reagan defended his actions as a nonracial term that was common in his Illinois hometown. Ultimately, Reagan never used that particular phrasing again. According to Ian Haney Lopez, the "young buck" term changed into "young fellow" which was less overtly racist: "'Some young fellow' was less overtly racist and so carried less risk of censure, and worked just as well to provoke a sense of white victimization".

Lee Atwater argued that Reagan did not use the Southern strategy or need to make racial appeals:

Atwater: But Reagan did not have to do a southern strategy for two reasons. Number one, race was not a dominant issue. And number two, the mainstream issues in this campaign had been, quote, southern issues since way back in the sixties. So Reagan goes out and campaigns on the issues of economics and of national defense. The whole campaign was devoid of any kind of racism, any kind of reference.

=== Bush ===
Southern white conservatives were plurality Democratic in 1976, with independent in second and Republican in third at 30%. The Republican figure rose to 40% in 1980, and 52% in 1984. In 1988, 60% identified themselves as Republicans while 16% identified as Democrats.

Bush selected Atwater to manage his presidential campaign in the 1988 election. Atwater obtained hundreds of southern endorsements for Bush and focused on Evangelical voters, who made up a large number of the southern electorate.

Proposals for holding the presidential primaries of southern states at once started in the 1970s in order to maintain and increase the region's influence in presidential elections. It would allow for a conservative favorite son candidate from the south to receive a lead in delegate totals and produce momentum for the other primaries. Other southern presidential candidates had fared poorly in the initial contests in Iowa and New Hampshire which allowed more liberal candidates to gain the nomination.

Alabama, Florida, and Georgia designated the second Tuesday of March as the date for their presidential primaries and the Southern Legislative Conference lobbied other states to join. 864 Democratic and 564 Republican delegates came from the southern states in the 1988 primary. Frank Fahrenkopf, chair of the Republican National Committee, stated that "Southern Democrats intended Super Tuesday to be a way to moderate their party", but that "the Democrats have handed us a tremendous opportunity to win over the disaffected majority of their party".

174 delegates were selected in the Republican primary before Super Tuesday and Bush held 35.1% of these delegates. After Super Tuesday Bush held 73.5% of the 959 delegates selected so far. Bush's victory in all but one state on Super Tuesday nearly secured him enough delegates to win the primary. Bush won a majority of the vote in all southern states except for in three states, and received 85.7% of their delegates due to the primaries being winner-take-all. Pat Robertson's campaign was weakened following a defeat in South Carolina and Super Tuesday.

Southern turnout in the Republican primaries rose from 2.1 million in 1980, to 3.8 million in 1988. Turnout in Texas rose from 527,000 to 1,015,000, in Florida from 614,000 to 901,000, and in Georgia from 200,000 to 401,000. Over 40% of southern white voters participated in the Republican primaries except for in Tennessee, North Carolina, Louisiana, and Arkansas. 97% of the Republican electorate in the primaries were white.

=== Willie Horton attack ads ===
During the 1988 presidential election, the Willie Horton attack ads run against Democratic candidate Michael Dukakis built upon the Southern Strategy in a campaign that reinforced the notion that Republicans best represent conservative whites with traditional values. Lee Atwater and Roger Ailes worked on the campaign as Bush's political strategists. Upon seeing a favorable New Jersey focus group response to the Horton strategy, Atwater recognized that an implicit racial appeal could work outside of the Southern states. The subsequent ads featured Horton's mugshot and played on fears of black criminals. Atwater said of the strategy: "By the time we're finished, they're going to wonder whether Willie Horton is Dukakis' running mate". Al Gore was the first to use the Willie Horton prison furlough against Dukakis and—like the Bush campaign—would not mention race. The Bush campaign claimed they were initially made aware of the Horton issue via the Gore campaign's use of the subject. Bush initially hesitated to use the Horton campaign strategy, but the campaign saw it as a wedge issue to harm Dukakis who was struggling against Democratic rival Jesse Jackson.

In addition to presidential campaigns, subsequent Republican campaigns for the House of Representatives and Senate in the South employed the Southern Strategy.

New York Times opinion columnist Bob Herbert wrote in 2005: "The truth is that there was very little that was subconscious about the G.O.P.'s relentless appeal to racist whites. Tired of losing elections, it saw an opportunity to renew itself by opening its arms wide to white voters who could never forgive the Democratic Party for its support of civil rights and voting rights for blacks". Aistrup described the transition of the Southern Strategy saying that it has "evolved from a states' rights, racially conservative message to one promoting in the Nixon years, vis-à-vis the courts, a racially conservative interpretation of civil rights laws—including opposition to busing. With the ascendancy of Reagan, the Southern Strategy became a national strategy that melded race, taxes, anticommunism, and religion".

Some analysts viewed the 1990s as the apogee of Southernization or the Southern Strategy, given that the Democratic President Bill Clinton and Vice President Al Gore were from the South as were Congressional leaders on both sides of the aisle. During the end of Nixon's presidency, the Senators representing the former Confederate states in the 93rd Congress were primarily Democrats. During the beginning of Bill Clinton's presidency twenty years later in the 103rd Congress, this was still the case.

== Role of churches ==
Certain Christian denominations show strong preferences, by both membership and publicly expressed views, for certain political parties, particularly evangelicals for the Republican party and historically black churches for the Democratic Party. Additionally, voter guides are either designed for distribution by specific churches or are made easily available. Consequently, churches have played a key role in support of the Southern strategy, particularly Southern Baptists. Black Baptists, on the other hand, served as a source of resistance to Jim Crow through parallel institutions, intellectual traditions, and activism which extend into the present day.

== Shifts in strategy (1990s and 2000s) ==
Democrats held a majority of the US House and US Senate seats in the south after the 1992 elections. However, the Republicans gained a 64 to 61 control in the US House and 13 to 9 control in the US Senate after the 1994 elections.

Richard Shelby, who was elected to the US Senate in 1986 as a conservative Democrat with a minority of the white vote, joined the Republicans after the 1994 election.

Ten of the twelve Democrats who served as Speaker or Minority Leader between 1891 and 1961 were from the south. Southerners held at least one leadership position during the Democratic control of Congress in the later half of the 20th century. The Republican leaders of the 104th United States Congress (Newt Gingrich, Dick Armey, and Tom DeLay) were all from the south. Trent Lott, a southerner, replaced Alan Simpson as the party's whip in the US Senate and later became the Majority Leader in 1996.

In the mid-1990s, the Republican Party made major attempts to court African American voters, believing that the strength of religious values within the African American community and the growing number of affluent and middle-class African Americans would lead this group increasingly to support Republican candidates. In general, these efforts did not significantly increase African American support for the Republican Party. Few African Americans voted for George W. Bush and other national Republican candidates in the 2004 elections, although he attracted a higher percentage of black voters (15%) to identify as Republican than had any GOP candidate since Dwight D. Eisenhower (24%). In his article "The Race Problematic, the Narrative of Martin Luther King Jr., and the Election of Barack Obama", Dr. Rickey Hill argued that Bush implemented his own Southern Strategy by exploiting "the denigration of the liberal label to convince white conservatives to vote for him. Bush's appeal was to the same racist tropes that had been used since the Goldwater and Nixon days."

Following Bush's re-election, Ken Mehlman, Bush's campaign manager and Chairman of the Republican National Committee, held several large meetings in 2005 with African American business, community and religious leaders. In his speeches, he apologized for his party's use of the Southern Strategy in the past. When asked about the strategy of using race as an issue to build GOP dominance in the once-Democratic South, Mehlman replied,

Republican candidates often have prospered by ignoring black voters and even by exploiting racial tensions [...] by the '70s and into the '80s and '90s, the Democratic Party solidified its gains in the African-American community, and we Republicans did not effectively reach out. Some Republicans gave up on winning the African-American vote, looking the other way or trying to benefit politically from racial polarization. I am here today as the Republican chairman to tell you we were wrong.

Thomas Edge argues that the election of President Barack Obama saw a new type of Southern Strategy emerge among conservative voters. They used his election as evidence of a post-racial era to deny the need of continued civil rights legislation while simultaneously playing on racial tensions and marking him as a "racial bogeyman". Edge described three parts to this phenomenon saying:

First, according to the arguments, a nation that has the ability to elect a Black president is completely free of racism. Second, attempts to continue the remedies enacted after the civil rights movement will only result in more racial discord, demagoguery, and racism against White Americans. Third, these tactics are used side-by-side with the veiled racism and coded language of the original Southern Strategy.

Other observers have suggested that the election of President Obama in the 2008 presidential election and subsequent re-election in 2012 signaled the growing irrelevance of the Southern Strategy-style tactics. Louisiana State University political scientists Wayne Parent, for example, suggested that Obama's ability to get elected without the support of Southern states demonstrate that the region was moving from "the center of the political universe to being an outside player in presidential politics" while University of Maryland, Baltimore County political scientist Thomas Schaller argued that the Republican party had "marginalized" itself, becoming a "mostly regional party" through a process of Southernization.

== Scholarly debates ==
The Southern strategy is generally believed to be the primary force that transformed the "Democratic South into a reliable GOP stronghold in presidential elections". Scholars generally emphasize the role of racial backlash in the realignment of southern voters. The viewpoint that the electoral realignment of the Republican party due to a race-driven Southern Strategy is also known as the "top-down" viewpoint. Most scholarship and analysts support this top-down viewpoint and state that the political shift was due primarily to racial issues. Some historians believe that racial issues took a back seat to a grassroots narrative known as the "suburban strategy", which Glen Feldman calls a "dissenting—yet rapidly growing—narrative on the topic of southern partisan realignment".

Around the 1990s, scholars on conservatism sought to re-examine prevailing scholarship around the southern strategy. Scholars such as Matthew Lassiter, Kevin Kruse, and Joseph Crespino advocated against the idea of "Southern Exceptionalism" while still acknowledging the centrality of a racial backlash. Matthew Lassiter says: "A suburban-centered vision reveals that demographic change played a more important role than racial demagoguery in the emergence of a two-party system in the American South". Lassiter argues that race-based appeals cannot explain the GOP shift in the South while also noting that the real situation is far more complex. Specifically, authors like Lassiter and Kevin Kruse argue that, while the origins of suburbanization began with white flight into suburbs, these suburban voters embraced free market, de facto segregation and sincere color-blind politics that made them more aligned with the Republican Party.

According to Lassiter, some political scientists and historians believe that the timing does not fit the "Southern Strategy" model. They believe that because Nixon carried 49 states in 1972, he operated a successful national strategy, rather than a regional one; the Republican Party remained quite weak at the local and state levels across the entire South for decades. Republicans first won a majority of US House seats in the South in the 1994 "Republican Revolution", and only began to dominate southern congressional elections after the 2010 elections.

Bruce Kalk and George Tindall argue that Nixon's Southern Strategy was to find a compromise on race that would take the issue out of politics, allowing conservatives in the South to rally behind his grand plan to reorganize the national government. Kalk and Tindall emphasize the similarity between Nixon's operations and the series of compromises orchestrated by Rutherford B. Hayes in 1877 that ended the battles over Reconstruction and put Hayes in the White House. Kalk says Nixon did end the reform impulse and sowed the seeds for the political rise of white Southerners and the decline of the civil rights movement.

Dean Kotlowski argues that Nixon's overall civil rights record was on the whole responsible and that Nixon tended to seek the middle ground. He campaigned as a moderate in 1968, pitching his appeal to the widest range of voters. Furthermore, he continued this strategy as president. As a matter of principle, says Kotlowski, he supported integration of schools. However, Nixon chose not to antagonize Southerners who opposed it and left enforcement to the judiciary, which had originated the issue in the first place. In particular, Kotlowski believes historians have been somewhat misled by Nixon's rhetorical Southern Strategy that had limited influence on actual policies.

Nicholas Valentino and David O. Sears conducted their own study and reported that "the South's shift to the Republican party has been driven to a significant degree by racial conservatism" and also concluded that "racial conservatism seems to continue to be central to the realignment of Southern whites' partisanship since the Civil Rights era". Valentino and Sears state that some "[o]ther scholars downplay the role of racial issues and prejudice even in contemporary racial politics". And that "the conventional wisdom about partisanship today seems to point to divisions over the size of government (including taxes, social programs, and regulation), national security, and moral issues such as abortion and gay rights, with racial issues only one of numerous areas about which liberals and conservatives disagree, and far from the most important one at that".

Jeremy Mayer argues that scholars have given too much emphasis on the civil rights issue as it was not the only deciding factor for Southern white voters. Goldwater took positions on such issues as privatizing the Tennessee Valley Authority, abolishing Social Security and ending farm price supports that outraged many white Southerners who strongly supported these programs. Mayer states:

Goldwater's staff also realized that his radical plan to sell the Tennessee Valley Authority was causing even racist whites to vote for Johnson. A Florida editorial urged Southern whites not to support Goldwater even if they agreed with his position on civil rights, because his other positions would have grave economic consequences for the region. Goldwater's opposition to most poverty programs, the TVA, aid to education, Social Security, the Rural Electrification Administration, and farm price supports surely cost him votes throughout the South and the nation.

Political scientist Nelson W. Polsby argued that economic development was more central than racial desegregation in the evolution of the postwar South in Congress. In The End of Southern Exceptionalism: Class, Race, and Partisan Change in the Postwar South, University of Wisconsin political scientist Byron E. Shafer and University of British Columbia political scientist Richard Johnston developed Polsby's argument in greater depth. Using roll call analysis of voting patterns in the House of Representatives, they found that issues of desegregation and race were less important than issues of economics and social class when it came to the transformation of partisanship in the South. This view is backed by Glenn Feldman who notes that the early narratives on the Southern realignment focused on the idea of appealing to racism. This argument was first and thus took hold as the accepted narrative. In a later publication, The Great Melding: War, the Dixiecrat Rebellion, and the Southern Model for America's New Conservatism, Feldman outlined that poor whites believed they had more racial affinity with white elites than class affinity with blacks, despite being adversely affected by economic policies of the white elites.

Gareth Davies argues that "[t]he scholarship of those who emphasize the southern strategizing Nixon is not so much wrong—it captures one side of the man—as it is unsophisticated and incomplete. Nixon and his enemies needed one another in order to get the job done". Lawrence McAndrews makes a similar argument, saying Nixon pursued a mixed strategy:

Some scholars claim that Nixon succeeded, by leading a principled assault on de jure school desegregation. Others claim that he failed, by orchestrating a politically expedient surrender to de facto school segregation. A close examination of the evidence, however, reveals that in the area of school desegregation, Nixon's record was a mixture of principle and politics, progress and paralysis, success and failure. In the end, he was neither simply the cowardly architect of a racially insensitive "Southern strategy" which condoned segregation, nor the courageous conductor of a politically risky "not-so-Southern strategy" which condemned it.

Historian Joan Hoff noted that in interviews with historians years later, Nixon denied that he ever practiced a Southern strategy. Harry S. Dent Sr., one of Nixon's senior advisers on Southern politics, told Nixon privately in 1969 that the administration "has no Southern Strategy, but rather a national strategy which, for the first time in modern times, includes the South".

== See also ==
- Conservatism in the United States
- Politics of the Southern United States
- Politics of the United States
- Solid South
- Second Redemption
- White backlash

== Works cited ==
- Black, Earl; Black, Merle (2002). The Rise of Southern Republicans. Harvard University Press. ISBN 067400728X.
- Black, Earl; Black, Merle (1992). The Vital South: How Presidents Are Elected. Harvard University Press. ISBN 0674941306.
- Hadley, Charles; Stanley, Harold (1989). "Super Tuesday 1988: Regional Results and National Implications". Publius. 19 (3). Oxford University Press: 19–37. JSTOR 3330481.
- Hardeman, D.; Bacon, Donald (1990). Rayburn: A Biography. Texas Monthly. ISBN 0932012035.
- Moreland, Laurence; Steed, Robert; Baker, Tod, eds. (1991). The 1988 Presidential Election in the South: Continuity Amidst Change in Southern Party Politics. Praeger Publishers. ISBN 0275931455.
- Sherman, Richard (1973). The Republican Party and Black America From McKinley to Hoover 1896-1933. University of Virginia Press. ISBN 0813904676.
- Steed, Robert; Moreland, Laurence; Baker, Tod, eds. (1980). Party Politics in the South. Praeger Publishers. ISBN 0030565863.
- Sundquist, James, ed. (1983). Dynamics of the Party System: Alignment and Realignment of Political Parties in the United States. Brookings Institution. ISBN 0815782268.
