= Elections in the Southern United States =

Elections in the Southern United States are a composite or summary of elections is each of its component states.

The South produced several electoral movements such as Strom Thurmond's Dixiecrats in 1948 and George Wallace's American Independent Party in 1968. The region has played an important role in Presidential elections, providing the winners in the elections of 1976, 1988, 1992, 1996, 2000, and 2004; and the loser in 1980 and 1992.

== Ante-bellum ==
Due to the region's agricultural success, the South became integral to the electoral history of the United States. Many of the United States' early military and political leaders (including nine of its first twelve presidents) were elected from the Southern United States.

== After the Civil War ==
After the Civil War many white Southerners who had actively supported the Confederacy were temporarily without some of the basic rights of citizenship (such as the ability to vote). With the passage of the 13th Amendment to the Constitution of the United States (which outlawed slavery), the 14th Amendment (which granted full U.S. citizenship to African Americans) and the 15th amendment (which extended the right to vote to black males), African Americans in the South began to enjoy a full range of citizens' rights which were broader than those extended to free blacks, even in the North, in decades before the war.

White Democrats regained power by the late 1870s, and began to pass laws to restrict black voting in a period they came to refer to as Redemption. From 1890–1908 states of the former Confederacy passed statutes and amendments to their state constitutions that effectively disfranchised most blacks and tens of thousands of poor whites in the South through devices such as residency requirements, poll taxes, and literacy tests.

== Twentieth-century political movements ==
=== Dixiecrat movement ===
In 1948, a group of Democratic congressmen, led by Governor Strom Thurmond of South Carolina, split from the Democrats in reaction to an anti-segregation speech given by Minneapolis mayor Hubert Humphrey, founding the States Rights Democratic or Dixiecrat Party. During that year's Presidential election, the party ran Thurmond as its candidate and he had the Democratic party designation in the deep south states, which he carried. The movement then disappeared.

=== The Solid South ===
Solid South refers to the electoral support of white voters in the Southern United States for Democratic Party candidates for nearly a century after the Reconstruction era (1877–1964). In most of the South, very few blacks were able to vote.

Democratic candidates typically won by large margins in the South in every presidential election from 1876 until 1948. The main exception was 1928 when candidate Al Smith, a wet Catholic, did poorly outside the Deep South.

Especially in the 1960s, the national Democratic Party's support of the Civil Rights Movement, capped by President Lyndon Johnson's support for the Civil Rights Act and Voting Rights Act, led to white southerners turning away from the Democratic Party. The Republican Party made gains in the South by way of its "Southern strategy." Today, the Republican Party has substantial strength among white southerners. African Americans in the South have mostly voted with the Democratic Party in state and national elections since the civil rights years.

Voting changes arrived in the mid-1960s when the federal government passed the Voting Rights Act of 1965, which restored the ability of minorities to vote.

=== George Wallace and the Southern strategy ===
In 1968, Democratic Alabama Governor George C. Wallace ran for President on the American Independent Party ticket. Wallace ran a "law and order" campaign similar to that of Republican candidate, Richard Nixon. While Nixon won, Wallace won a number of Southern states. This inspired Nixon and other Republican leaders to create the Southern Strategy of winning Presidential elections. This strategy focused on securing the electoral votes of the U.S. Southern states by having candidates promote states' rights and culturally conservative values, such as family issues, religion, and patriotism, which appealed strongly to Southern voters. Analysts evaluated issues of states' rights and busing as code words for the changes of integration.

=== Jimmy Carter, the 1976 Presidential election, and the rise of the Religious Right ===
In the 1976 election, former Georgia governor Jimmy Carter won the Democratic nomination for President of the United States. Carter, a peanut farmer and Southern Baptist Sunday school teacher became the first Democratic president to date to defeat the Republicans' Southern Strategy. He defeated George Wallace in the Democratic primary and carried every Southern state in the general election, with the exceptions of Virginia and Oklahoma. Carter ran a culturally Southern, populist campaign. People of his hometown of Plains, Georgia held fundraisers with "covered-dish" dinners and its residents traveled north to campaign by train on the "Peanut Express". As a moderate Republican who generally kept his religious views to himself, Ford was unable to endear himself to Bible Belt voters. Carter's victory was significant in that he was among the few U.S. Presidents to have claimed to be a born-again Christian.

By 1980 Carter's approval ratings plummeted due a poor economy and the Iran hostage crisis. In addition, although Carter had energized Southern evangelicals in his 1976 campaign, as perhaps the first "born-again" president, a backlash among some white conservative evangelicals led to the formation of the Religious right. It split the Southern evangelical vote and denied Carter a victory in many states. Ronald Reagan won the 1980 presidential election in a landslide; Carter retained majorities in Georgia, West Virginia, Maryland, and the District of Columbia, becoming the last Democratic candidate to perform better in the South than nationally.

=== The Contract with America ===
In 1994, Pennsylvania-born Georgia Congressman Newt Gingrich ushered in a "Republican revolution" with his "Contract with America". Gingrich, then the Minority Whip of the House, created the document to detail what the Republican Party would do if they won that year's United States Congressional election. The contract detailed several proposed aspects of governmental reform. Nearly all of the Republican candidates in the election signed the contract. For the first time in 40 years, the Republicans won control of the Congress. Gingrich became Speaker of the House, serving in that position from 1995 to 1999.

During this period, a number of current Congressional leaders were also from the South, including former President Pro Tem of the Senate Strom Thurmond of South Carolina, former Senate Majority Leader Bill Frist of Tennessee, Senate Minority Leader Mitch McConnell of Kentucky, and Former House Majority Leader Tom DeLay of Texas.

== Twenty-first century ==
=== 2006 elections and return to Democratic control ===
In the early 21st century, Republicans were able to maintain their hold on the federal government, as President George W. Bush was able to forge a powerful coalition of Southern states that had been out of reach of the Republican party in the last two Presidential contests. In particular, Bush's increased popularity following the September 11 attacks in 2001 enabled him to aid in the defeat of most Southern Democratic Senators in 2002 and 2004. On November 7, 2006, however, the Democratic Party once again regained control of the House and Senate, as well as control of the Southern Governors Association. The election was the first since the Gulf Coast was struck by Hurricane Katrina.

Prior to the election, two government scandals involving Congressional Republicans fueled a public backlash. The first was the Abramoff scandal, in which lobbyist Jack Abramoff and others presented bribes to legislators on behalf of Indian casino gambling interests. In the South, the scandal had the effect of ending Ralph Reed's political career, when he lost the primary election for Lieutenant Governor of Georgia. The scandal also ended the career of House Majority Leader Tom DeLay of Texas.

In 2005, a Texas grand jury indicted DeLay on criminal charges that he had conspired to violate campaign finance laws. DeLay denied the charges, saying that they were politically motivated, but Republican Conference rules forced him to resign temporarily from his position as Majority Leader. In January 2006, under pressure from fellow Republicans, DeLay announced that he would not seek to return to the position. In the months before and after this decision, two of his former aides were convicted in the Jack Abramoff scandal. DeLay ran for re-election in 2006, and won the Republican primary election in March 2006, but, citing the possibility of losing the general election, he announced in April 2006 that he would withdraw from the race and resign his seat in Congress. He resigned on June 9, 2006, and sought to remove his name from the ballot. The court battle that followed forced him to remain on the ballot, despite having withdrawn from the race. Democrat Nick Lampson ultimately won DeLay's House seat in TX-22.

A second scandal, commonly known as the Mark Foley scandal, involved Florida Congressman Mark Foley's sending sexually explicit messages to underage Congressional pages. Foley resigned, but his name remained on the ballot, and Democrat Tim Mahoney won the general election. The scandal led to Foley's resignation from Congress on September 29, 2006. It is believed to have contributed to the Republican Party's loss of control over Congress in the November 7, 2006 election, as well as the end of House Speaker Dennis Hastert's leadership of the House Republicans. Kirk Fordham also resigned as a result of the scandal. (See Mark Foley scandal.)

==== Senate ====
In 2006, the close contest that determined the final outcome of Democratic Senate control was Democrat and former Marine Jim Webb's unlikely victory against incumbent Virginia Senator (and former Governor) George Allen. Allen's poll numbers had plummeted after a video was released of Allen taunting an Indian-American student at a rally with what were interpreted as racially charged remarks. (See Macaca (slur).) In Missouri, Democrat Claire McCaskill defeated incumbent Senator Jim Talent.

==== House of Representatives ====
- In Texas, both the twenty-second and twenty-third districts switched to Democratic control.
- In Florida, both the sixteenth and twenty-second districts were lost to Democrats.
- In North Carolina's eleventh House district, Heath Shuler defeated incumbent Charles H. Taylor.

==== Changing Congressional leadership ====
While Republicans lost key Congressional leadership positions following the 2006 elections, new Democratic leaders emerged from below the Mason–Dixon line.

===== United States House of Representatives =====
- Jim Clyburn of South Carolina became the third-ranking House Majority Whip, the first South Carolina native to hold the position, while South Carolinian John Spratt became chairman of the House Budget Committee.
- Bennie Thompson of Mississippi became chairman of the United States House Committee on Homeland Security.
- Nick Rahall of West Virginia chaired the United States House Committee on Natural Resources.
- Bart Gordon of Tennessee led the United States House Committee on Science and Technology.
- The House Permanent Select Committee on Intelligence was chaired by Silvestre Reyes of Texas.

===== United States Senate =====
- Following his re-election in 2006, Robert Byrd of West Virginia became chairman of the Senate Appropriations Committee and President pro tempore of the United States Senate, placing him third in line in Presidential succession.
- Jay Rockefeller, also of West Virginia, chaired the Senate Intelligence Committee.

==== Democratic control of Governorships ====
In the 2006 gubernatorial elections, Mike Beebe of Arkansas regained the governorship previously held by Republican Mike Huckabee. In Maryland, Martin O'Malley defeated incumbent Republican governor Bob Ehrlich. In 2007, Kentucky Democrat Steve Beshear defeated incumbent Republican governor Ernie Fletcher. These victories gave the Democratic Party a decisive 10-8 majority in the Southern Governors Association. Joe Manchin of West Virginia subsequently became chairman of the association, while Tim Kaine of Virginia became Vice-Chairman.

=== Republican resurgence ===
==== Virginia, 2009 ====
Only a year after Barack Obama won a comfortable victory in the 2008 presidential election, the first signs of a GOP resurgence in two gubernatorial elections were seen, one of them in the South. In Virginia, a state that Obama carried by 6%, Republican Bob McDonnell won the seat vacated by the term-limited Kaine by a 17% margin. This proved to be a prelude to more significant pickups in 2010.

==== 2010 ====
The 2010 elections were held in the backdrop of the Great Recession. The Patient Protection and Affordable Care Act passed shortly before the elections, and a reenergized conservative movement, with its most visible manifestation being the Tea Party movement.

===== Gubernatorial elections =====
Eight Southern states held gubernatorial elections. The GOP picked up two seats held by term-limited Democrats; Mary Fallin won the seat vacated by Brad Henry in Oklahoma and Bill Haslam won the seat vacated by Phil Bredesen in Tennessee. The GOP also held all of its other Southern governorships. Rick Perry won a third term in Texas, while Robert Bentley, Nathan Deal, and Nikki Haley won seats held by term-limited Republicans in Alabama, Georgia, and South Carolina. In Florida, Rick Scott won the seat vacated by Charlie Crist, who was elected as a Republican but switched to an independent during his unsuccessful U.S. Senate run. These results gave the GOP an 11–7 majority in the Southern Governors Association when all the new governors were sworn in.

===== U.S. Senate =====
The GOP made substantial gains in the U.S. Senate. While the Democrats maintained control over the chamber, their majority was reduced from 59–41 to 53–47 (both totals include two independents who caucus with the Democrats). One of the GOP pickups came in Arkansas, where John Boozman easily defeated incumbent Blanche Lincoln. The Republicans also successfully defended all of their own seats, including eight in the South.

===== U.S. House =====
The greatest Republican gains came in the U.S. House, where the GOP more than erased its losses from 2006 and 2008 by gaining 63 seats, retaking control of the chamber in the process. These gains were the largest by either party in any House election since 1948 and in a midterm election since 1938.

== U.S. Congress ==
When the 112th Congress convened in January 2011, many leadership positions in the new GOP majority were held by Southerners:

- Eric Cantor of Virginia is House Majority Leader.
- Jeb Hensarling of Texas is Conference Chairman.
- Frank Lucas of Oklahoma is the chair of the Agriculture Committee.
- Joe Barton of Texas is the chair of the Energy and Commerce Committee.
- Jo Bonner of Alabama is the chair of the Ethics Committee.
- Spencer Bachus of Alabama is the chair of the Financial Services Committee.
- Ileana Ros-Lehtinen of Florida is the chair of the Foreign Affairs Committee.
- Lamar Smith of Texas is the chair of the Judiciary Committee.
- Ralph Hall of Texas is the chair of the Science and Technology Committee.
- John Mica of Florida is the chair of the Transportation Committee.

== See also ==
- Politics of the Southern United States
