= Neoabolitionism =

Neoabolitionism may refer to:

- neo-abolitionism, a Nordic model approach to prostitution law
- Neoabolitionism (race relations), a term used in historiography to characterize historians writing about abolitionists
