= Northern Tier (United States) =

Northernmost part of the contiguous United States

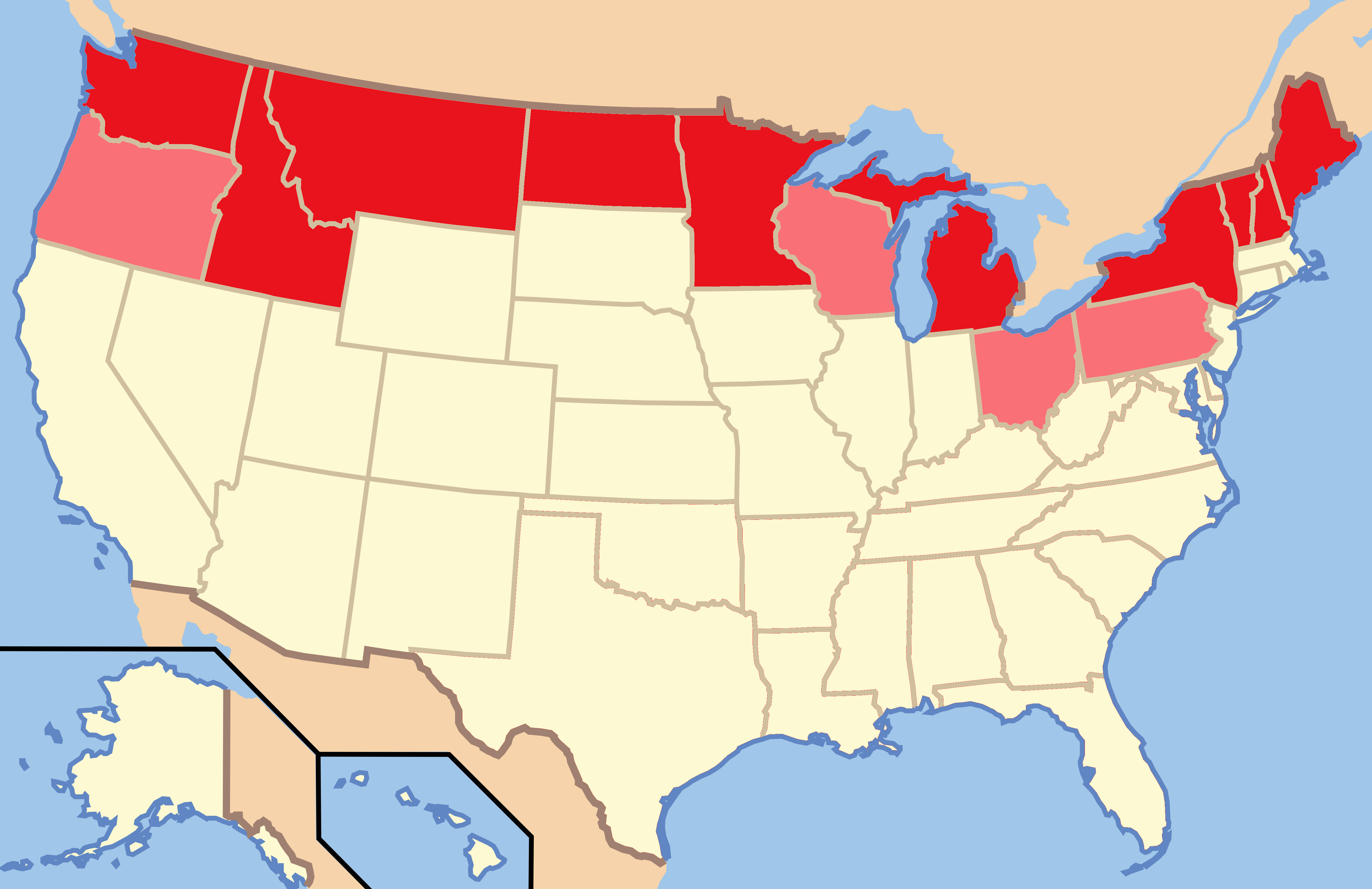
The Northern Tier of the United States. States sometimes included are shown in light red.

The Northern Tier is the northernmost part of the contiguous United States, along the border with Canada (including the border on the Great Lakes). It can be defined as the states that border Canada (excluding Alaska), but historians include all of New England in the Northern Tier, as well as states of the Pacific Northwest, because of the common culture they shared for more than a century. Sometimes the area was called "Greater New England", because of the influence of its culture as migrants moved west across the continent. It had a consistent political culture until the 1960s.

== Definition ==
Moving northeast to northwest (as the majority of population did), the states include (with sometimes-included states annotated with asterisks): Maine, New Hampshire, Vermont, Massachusetts, Rhode Island, Connecticut, New York, Pennsylvania*, Ohio*, Michigan, Wisconsin*, Iowa*, Minnesota, South Dakota*, North Dakota, Montana, Idaho, Oregon* and Washington.

== History ==
=== Contemporary era ===
President Donald Trump's second-term trade war with Canada is anticipated to cause economic issues in the northern U.S. border states.

== Culture ==
=== Sports ===
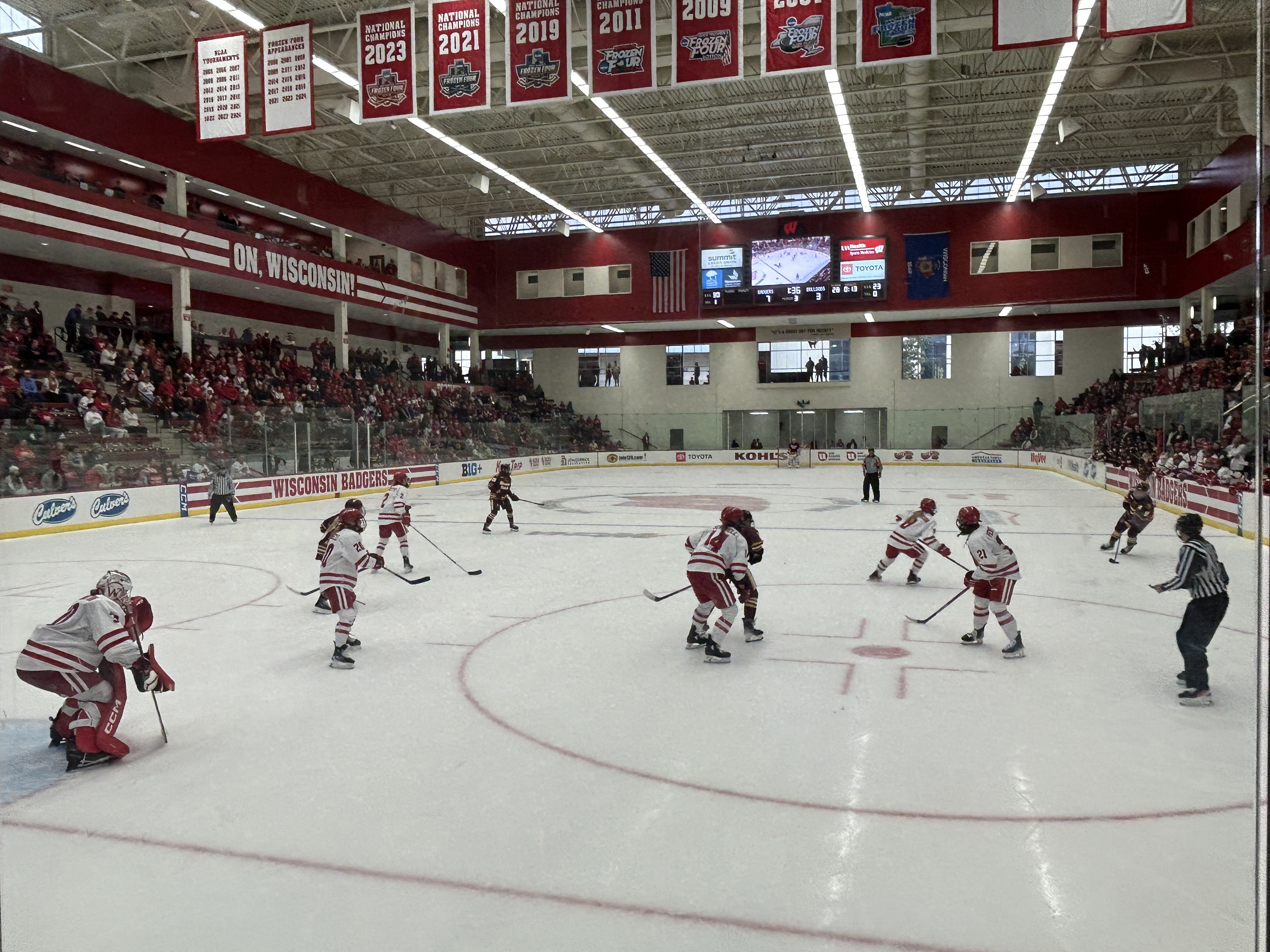
Minnesota Duluth Bulldogs at Wisconsin Badgers in ice hockey

Ice hockey is one of the more popular sports in the region, due to the cold climate and proximity with Canada. Various other winter activities are also popular, such as skiing.

== See also ==
- Upper Midwest
- North Country, New York
- Yankee – Term for people from the United States
- Northern United States
- International border states of the United States
  - Sun Belt – Region of the southern United States
