= Politics of the Southern United States =

The Southern United States as defined by the United States Census Bureau. The "South" and its regions are defined in various ways, however.

The politics of the Southern United States generally refers to the political landscape of the Southern United States. The institution of slavery had a profound impact on the politics of the Southern United States, causing the American Civil War and continued subjugation of African-Americans from the Reconstruction era to the Civil Rights Act of 1964. Scholars have linked slavery to contemporary political attitudes, including racial resentment. From the Reconstruction era to the Civil Rights Act of 1964, pockets of the Southern United States were characterized as being "authoritarian enclaves".

The region was once referred to as the Solid South, due to its large consistent support for Democrats in all elective offices from 1877 to 1964. As a result, its Congressmen gained seniority across many terms, thus enabling them to control many congressional committees. Following the passage of the Civil Rights Act of 1964 and Voting Rights Act of 1965, Southern states became more reliably Republican in presidential politics, while Northeastern states became more reliably Democratic. Studies show that some Southern whites during the 1960s shifted to the Republican Party, in part due to racial conservatism. Majority support for the Democratic Party amongst Southern whites first fell away at the presidential level, and several decades later at the state and local levels. Both parties are competitive in a handful of Southern states, known as swing states.

== Southern states ==
According to the United States Census Bureau, the following states are considered part of the South:

- Alabama
- Arkansas
- Delaware
- Florida
- Georgia
- Kentucky
- Louisiana
- Maryland
- Mississippi
- North Carolina
- Oklahoma
- South Carolina
- Tennessee
- Texas
- Virginia
- West Virginia

Other definitions vary. For example, Missouri is often considered a border or Midwestern state, although many Ozark Missourians claim Missouri as a Southern state.

== Post-Civil War through 19th century ==
At the end of the Civil War, the South entered the Reconstruction era (1865–1877). The Reconstruction Acts of 1867 and 1868 placed most of the Confederate states under military rule (except Tennessee), which required Union Army governors to approve appointed officials and candidates for election. They enfranchised African American citizens and required voters to recite an oath of allegiance to the U.S. Constitution, effectively discouraging still-rebellious individuals from voting, and led to Republican control of many state governments. This was interpreted as anarchy and upheaval by many residents. However, Democrats would regain power in most Southern states by the late 1870s. Later, this period came to be referred to as Redemption. From 1890–1908 states of the former Confederacy passed statutes and amendments to their state constitutions, that effectively disenfranchised African Americans from voting, as well as some poor whites. They did this through devices such as poll taxes and literacy tests.

In the 1890s the South split bitterly, with poor cotton farmers moving to the Populist movement. In coalition with the remaining Republicans, the Populists briefly controlled Alabama and North Carolina. The local elites, townspeople, and landowners fought back, regaining control of the Democratic party by 1898.

== 20th century ==
During the 20th century, civil rights of African Americans became a central issue. Before 1964, African American citizens in the South and elsewhere in the United States were treated as second class citizens with minimal political rights.

=== 1948: Dixiecrat revolt ===
Few Southern Democrats rejected the 1948 Democratic political platform over President Harry's Truman's civil rights platform. They met at Birmingham, Alabama, and formed a political party named the "States' Rights" Democratic Party, more commonly known as the "Dixiecrats." Its main goal was to continue the policy of racial segregation and the Jim Crow laws that sustained it. South Carolina Governor Strom Thurmond, who had led the walkout, became the party's presidential nominee. Mississippi Governor Fielding L. Wright received the vice-presidential nomination. Thurmond had a moderate position in South Carolina politics, but with his allegiance with the Dixiecrats, he became the symbol of die-hard segregation. The Dixiecrats had no chance of winning the election since they failed to qualify for the ballots of enough states. Their strategy was to win enough Southern states to deny Truman an electoral college victory and force the election into the House of Representatives, where they could then extract concessions from either Truman or his opponent Thomas Dewey on racial issues in exchange for their support. Even if Dewey won the election outright, the Dixiecrats hoped that their defection would show that the Democratic Party needed Southern support to win national elections, and that this fact would weaken the Civil Rights Movement among Northern and Western Democrats. However, the Dixiecrats were weakened when most Southern Democratic leaders (such as Governor Herman Talmadge of Georgia and "Boss" E. H. Crump of Tennessee) refused to support the party. In the November election, Thurmond carried the Deep South states of Alabama, Louisiana, Mississippi, and South Carolina. Outside of these four states however, it was only listed as a third-party ticket. Thurmond would receive well over a million popular votes and 39 electoral votes.

=== Civil Rights Movement ===
Between 1955 and 1968, a movement towards desegregation began to take place in the American South. Martin Luther King Jr., a Baptist minister, and the Southern Christian Leadership Conference were highly influential in carrying out a strategy of non-violent protests and demonstrations. African American churches were prominent in organizing their congregations for leadership and protest. Protesters rallied against racial laws, at events such as the Montgomery bus boycott, the Selma to Montgomery marches, the Birmingham campaign, the Greensboro sit-in of 1960, and the March on Washington in 1963.

Legal changes came in the mid-1960s when President Lyndon B. Johnson pushed the Civil Rights Act of 1964 through Congress. It ended legal segregation. He also pushed through the Voting Rights Act of 1965, which set strict rules for protecting the right of African Americans to vote. This law has since been used to protect equal rights for all minorities as well as women.

=== Republican gains ===
For nearly a century after Reconstruction (1865–1877), the majority of the white South identified with the Democratic Party. Republicans during this time would only control parts of the mountains districts in southern Appalachia and competed for statewide office in the former border states. Before 1948, Southern Democrats believed that their stance on states' rights and appreciation of traditional southern values, was the defender of the southern way of life. Southern Democrats warned against designs on the part of northern liberals, Republicans (including Southern Republicans), and civil rights activists, whom they denounced as "outside agitators".

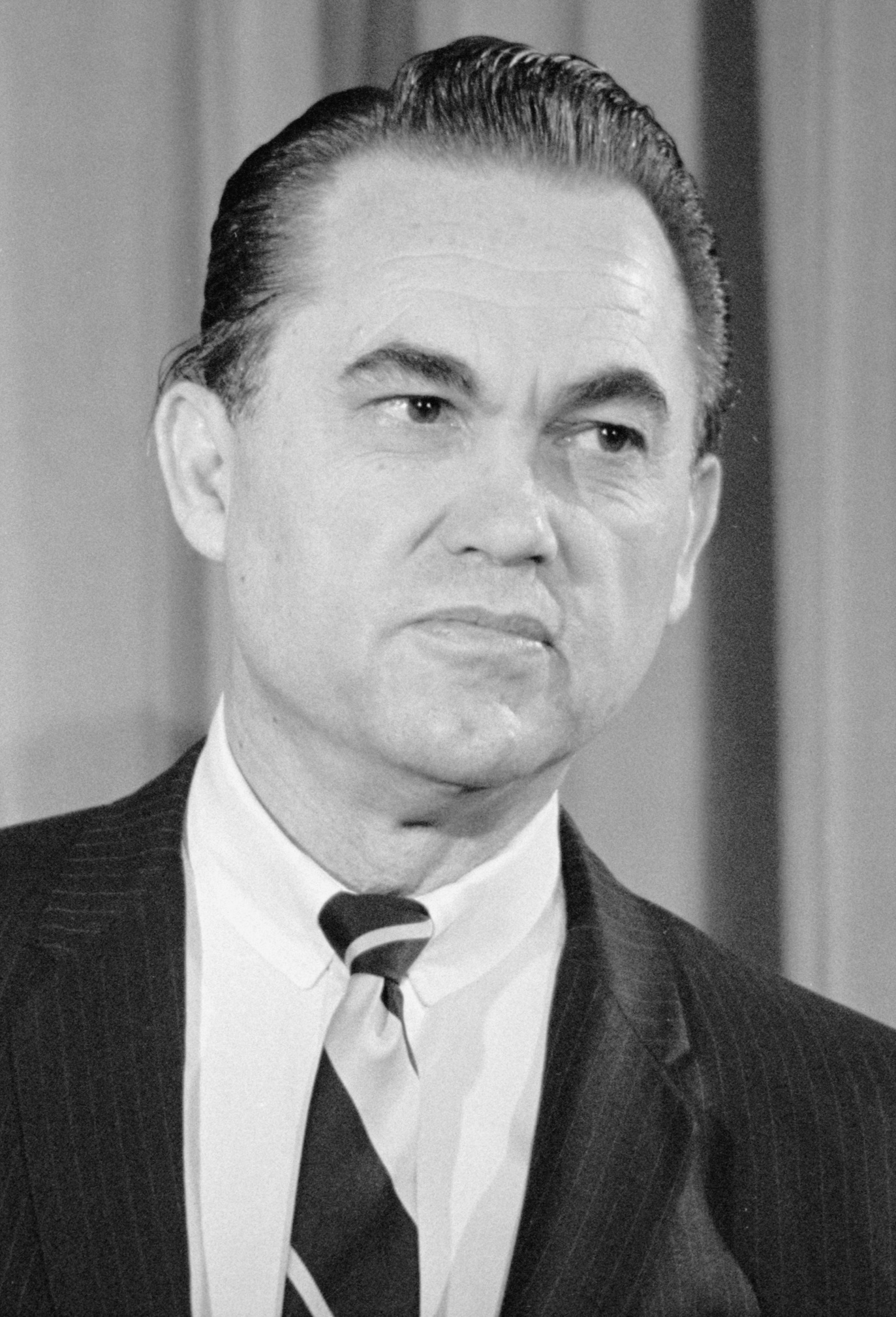
Alabama Governor George Wallace

The adoption of the first civil rights plank by the 1948 convention and President Truman's Executive Order 9981, which provided for equal treatment and opportunity for African-American military service members, divided the Democratic party's northern and southern wings. In 1952, the Democratic Party named John Sparkman, a moderate Senator from Alabama, as their vice presidential candidate with the hope of building party loyalty in the South. By the late 1950s, the national Democratic Party again began to embrace the Civil Rights Movement, and the old argument that Southern whites had to vote for Democrats to protect segregation grew weaker. Modernization had brought factories, national businesses and a more diverse culture to cities such as Atlanta, Dallas, Charlotte and Houston. This attracted millions of U.S. migrants from outside the region, including many African Americans to Southern cities. They gave priority to modernization and economic growth, over preservation of the old economic ways.

After the Civil Rights act of 1964 and The Voting Rights Act of 1965 were passed in Congress, only a small element resisted, led by Democratic governors Lester Maddox of Georgia, and especially George Wallace of Alabama. These populist governors appealed to a less-educated, working-class electorate, that favored the Democratic Party, but also supported segregation. George Wallace ran in the 1968 election, where he garnered 46 electoral votes and nearly 10 million popular votes, attracting mostly Southern Democrats away from Hubert Humphrey. Humphrey had the worst performance for a Democratic presidential nominee in the South since the 1868 election.

After the Brown v. Board of Education Supreme Court case that outlawed segregation in schools in 1954, integration caused enormous controversy in the white South. For this reason, compliance was very slow and was the subject of violent resistance in some areas.

The Democratic Party no longer acted as the champion of segregation. Newly enfranchised African American voters began supporting Democratic candidates at the 80-90-percent levels, producing Democratic leaders such as Julian Bond and John Lewis of Georgia, and Barbara Jordan of Texas.

Many white southerners switched to the Republican Party during the 1960s, for a variety of reasons. The majority of white southerners shared conservative positions on taxes, moral values, and national security. The Democratic Party had increasingly liberal positions rejected by these voters. In addition, the younger generations, who were politically conservative but wealthier and less attached to the Democratic Party, replaced the older generations who remained loyal to the party. The shift to the Republican Party took place slowly and gradually over almost a century.

== Late 20th century into 21st century ==
By the 1990s Republicans were starting to win elections at the statewide and local level throughout the South, even though Democrats retained majorities in several state legislatures through the 2000s and 2010s. By 2014, the region was heavily Republican at the local, state and national level. A key element in the change was the transformation of evangelical white Protestants in the south from largely nonpolitical to heavily Republican. Pew pollsters reported, "In the late 1980s, white evangelicals in the South were still mostly wedded to the Democratic Party while evangelicals outside the South were more aligned with the GOP. But over the course of the next decade or so, the GOP made gains among white Southerners generally and evangelicals in particular, virtually eliminating this regional disparity." Exit polls in the 2004 presidential election showed that Republican George W. Bush led Democrat John Kerry by 70–30% among Southern whites, who comprised 71% of the voters there. By contrast, Kerry had a 90–9 lead among the 18% of African American Southern voters. One-third of the Southern voters said they were white evangelicals; they voted for Bush by 80–20.

=== 2016–present ===
After the 2016 elections, nearly every state legislature in the South was GOP-controlled. Republican nominee for President Donald Trump notably won Elliott County, KY, becoming the first Republican presidential nominee to ever win that county. Following the 2019 elections, Democrats won control of Virginia's House of Delegates and State Senate, thus giving them trifecta over the state government for the first time since the 1990s. However, in 2021, Virginians would elect Glenn Youngkin as Governor and Republicans would retake control of the House of Delegates with a 52–48 majority. During the early 2020s, Georgia began to see itself become electorally competitive for Democrats again as Joe Biden won the state in 2020 election. Furthermore, Georgia would elect Democrats Jon Ossoff and Raphael Warnock as their Senators in concurrent regularly scheduled and special elections, respectively. Warnock would be elected to a full term in 2022 even as Republicans swept all statewide races and retained control of the state legislature.

=== Connections between education and politics ===
Research studies in American political affiliations demonstrate that an "uneducated"(lack of post-secondary school) white populace tends to vote Republican. Looking at the racial composition through the 2022 census demonstrates that the most prevalent race in the south are whites. Using these pieces of information, the tendency for the south to vote Republican could be further be explained as a lack of education in this region of the United States, as there are several majority-white states outside of the Deep South that tend to vote Democratic, but also many uneducated Southern blacks who vote Democrat as well, most likely due to the historical lack of state funding and educational focus in predominantly black schools and counties. (Red states and blue states).

== Recent trends ==
=== LGBTQ rights ===
In September 2004, Louisiana became the first state to adopt a constitutional ban on same-sex marriage in the South. This was followed by Arkansas, Georgia, Kentucky, Mississippi, and Oklahoma in November 2004; Texas in 2005; Alabama, South Carolina, Tennessee, and Virginia in 2006; Florida in 2008; and finally North Carolina in 2012. North Carolina became the 30th state to adopt a state constitutional ban of same-sex marriage. This ended with Obergefell v. Hodges Supreme Court case, which ruled in favor of same-sex marriage nationwide on June 26, 2015. Virginia removed its laws banning same-sex marriage in 2020, but the constitutional amendment banning it is still in place, although not currently enforceable also due to the 2022 Respect for Marriage Act. Republican-majority legislatures in Florida, Tennessee and Texas pushed for increased restrictions on transgender rights and gender-nonconforming expression in the 2020s.

=== Politics ===
While the general trend in the South has shown an increasing dominance of the Republican party since the 1960s, Southern politics in the 21st century are still contentious and competitive. States such as Georgia, Virginia and North Carolina are swing states. Georgia has a Republican governor and 2 Democratic U.S. Senators, and North Carolina has a Democratic Governor and 2 Republican U.S. Senators. Most Southern state legislatures, however, have been governed with Republican supermajorities in both houses at least once since 2000.

All the former Confederate Southern states supported Donald Trump in the 2016 Republican presidential primary except Texas (won by native son Ted Cruz). Trump won every former Confederate State except Virginia.

Most Southern states, since the earlier 20th century, adopted absolute majority requirements in Democratic "white primary" elections for state and local offices, largely to undermine challengers from among both moderates as well as those further to the right, such as members of the Ku Klux Klan. Some states, like Georgia and Mississippi, also adopted tighter thresholds, with Georgia adopting a County unit system for their Democratic primary and Mississippi adopting a requirement that general election candidates win with a majority of state house districts. Several court cases throughout the 20th and even the 21st centuries have challenged these laws. There have also been several changes to the laws, from Louisiana's adoption of the Nonpartisan blanket primary (in the form of the Louisiana primary) to Florida's abolition of the 50% requirement in primary and general elections. However, Georgia (from 1964 to 1994 and since 2005) and Mississippi (since 2020) remain the two states which require absolute majorities in both primaries and general elections.

Politics in the Southern United States, 2001–present
		Year																						
State	Elected office	2001	2002	2003	2004	2005	2006	2007	2008	2009	2010	2011	2012	2013	2014	2015	2016	2017	2018	2019	2020	2021	2022	2023
Alabama	President	George W. Bush (R)								John McCain (R)				Mitt Romney (R)				Donald Trump (R)						
Alabama	U.S. senators	2 R																	D, R			2 R		
Alabama	Congressional districts	R majority																						
Alabama	Governor	D		R																				
Alabama	Senate	D majority										R majority				R supermajority								
Alabama	House of Representatives	D majority										R supermajority												
Arkansas	President	George W. Bush (R)								John McCain (R)				Mitt Romney (R)				Donald Trump (R)						
Arkansas	U.S. senators	D, R		2 D								D, R				2 R								
Arkansas	Congressional districts	D majority										R majority												
Arkansas	Governor	R						D								R								
Arkansas	Senate	D majority												R majority		R supermajority								
Arkansas	House of Representatives	D majority												R majority				R supermajority						
Delaware	President	Al Gore (D)				John Kerry (D)				Barack Obama (D)								Hillary Clinton (D)			Joe Biden (D)			
Delaware	U.S. senators	2 D																						
Delaware	Congressional districts	R majority											D majority											
Delaware	Governor	D																						
Delaware	Senate	D majority																						
Delaware	House of Representatives	R majority								D majority														
Florida	President	George W. Bush (R)								Barack Obama (D)								Donald Trump (R)						
Florida	U.S. senators	2 D				D, R														2R				
Florida	Congressional districts	R majority																						
Florida	Governor	R									I	R												
Florida	Senate	R majority										R supermajority		R majority										R supermajority
Florida	House of Representatives	R majority		R supermajority				R majority				R supermajority		R majority										R supermajority
Georgia	President	George W. Bush (R)								John McCain (R)				Mitt Romney (R)				Donald Trump (R)			Joe Biden (D)			
Georgia	U.S. senators	D, R				2 R																2 D		
Georgia	Congressional districts	R majority																						
Georgia	Governor	D		R																				
Georgia	Senate	D majority		R majority										R supermajority						R majority				
Georgia	House of Representatives	D majority				R majority																		
Kentucky	President	George W. Bush (R)								John McCain (R)				Mitt Romney (R)				Donald Trump (R)						
Kentucky	U.S. senators	2 R																						
Kentucky	Congressional districts	R majority																						
Kentucky	Governor	D			R				D								R				D			
Kentucky	Senate	R majority													R supermajority									
Kentucky	House of Representatives	D majority															R majority				R supermajority			
Louisiana	President	George W. Bush (R)								John McCain (R)				Mitt Romney (R)				Donald Trump (R)						
Louisiana	U.S. senators	2 D				D, R										2R								
Louisiana	Congressional districts	R majority																						
Louisiana	Governor	R			D				R								D							
Louisiana	Senate	D majority										R majority									R supermajority			
Louisiana	House of Representatives	D majority										R majority												
Maryland	President	Al Gore (D)				John Kerry (D)				Barack Obama (D)								Hillary Clinton (D)			Joe Biden (D)			
Maryland	U.S. senators	2 D																						
Maryland	Congressional districts	4 D, 4 R												D majority										
Maryland	Governor	D		R				D								R								D
Maryland	Senate	D majority	D supermajority																					
Maryland	House of Delegates	D supermajority														D majority				D supermajority				
Mississippi	President	George W. Bush (R)								John McCain (R)				Mitt Romney (R)				Donald Trump (R)						
Mississippi	U.S. senators	2 R																						
Mississippi	Congressional districts	D majority		2 D, 2 R					D majority			R majority												
Mississippi	Governor	D		R																				
Mississippi	Senate	D majority						R majority	D majority			R majority												
Mississippi	House of Representatives	D majority										R majority												
North Carolina	President	George W. Bush (R)								Barack Obama (D)				Mitt Romney (R)				Donald Trump (R)						
North Carolina	U.S. senators	D, R				2 R				D, R						2 R								
North Carolina	Congressional districts	R majority						D majority				R majority												
North Carolina	Governor	D												R				D						
North Carolina	Senate	D majority										R majority		R supermajority						R majority				
North Carolina	House of Representatives	D majority		60 D, 60 R		D majority						R majority		R supermajority						R majority				
Oklahoma	President	George W. Bush (R)								John McCain (R)				Mitt Romney (R)				Donald Trump (R)						
Oklahoma	U.S. senators	2 R																						
Oklahoma	Congressional districts	R majority																						
Oklahoma	Governor	R		D								R												
Oklahoma	Senate	D majority						24 D, 24 R		R majority		R supermajority												
Oklahoma	House of Representatives	D majority				R majority						R supermajority												
South Carolina	President	George W. Bush (R)								John McCain (R)				Mitt Romney (R)				Donald Trump (R)						
South Carolina	U.S. senators	D, R				2 R																		
South Carolina	Congressional districts	R majority																						
South Carolina	Governor	D		R																				
South Carolina	Senate	R majority																						
South Carolina	House of Representatives	R majority																						R supermajority
Tennessee	President	George W. Bush (R)								John McCain (R)				Mitt Romney (R)				Donald Trump (R)						
Tennessee	U.S. senators	2 R																						
Tennessee	Congressional districts	R majority				D majority						R majority												
Tennessee	Governor	R		D								R												
Tennessee	Senate	D majority						16 R, 16 D, 1 I		R majority				R supermajority										
Tennessee	House of Representatives	D majority							49 R, 49 D, 1 CCR	R majority				R supermajority										
Texas	President	George W. Bush (R)								John McCain (R)				Mitt Romney (R)				Donald Trump (R)						
Texas	U.S. senators	2 R																						
Texas	Congressional districts	D majority				R majority																		
Texas	Governor	R																						
Texas	Senate	R majority																						
Texas	House of Representatives	D majority		R majority						R supermajority				R majority										
Virginia	President	George W. Bush (R)								Barack Obama (D)								Hillary Clinton (D)			Joe Biden (D)			
Virginia	U.S. senators	2 R						D, R		2 D														
Virginia	Congressional districts	R majority								D majority		R majority								D majority				
Virginia	Governor	R	D								R				D								R	
Virginia	Senate	R majority							D majority				R majority		D majority		R majority				D majority			
Virginia	House of Delegates	R majority											R supermajority						R majority		D majority		R majority	
West Virginia	President	George W. Bush (R)								John McCain (R)				Mitt Romney (R)				Donald Trump (R)						
West Virginia	U.S. senators	2 D														D, R								
West Virginia	Congressional districts	D majority										R majority												
West Virginia	Governor	D																R						
West Virginia	Senate	D supermajority										D majority				R majority					R supermajority			
West Virginia	House of Representatives	D supermajority				D supermajority								D majority		R majority					R supermajority			

Political views and affiliations in the South in 2016
Political views and affiliations	% living in the South
Hard-Pressed Democrats	48
Disaffected	41
Bystander	40
Main Street Republicans	40
New Coalition Democrats	40
Staunch Conservative	38
Post-Modern	31
Libertarian	28
Solid Liberal	26

== See also ==
- Elections in the Southern United States
- Bible Belt
- Politics of the United States
- Blue Dog Democrats
- Boll weevil (politics)
- Conservative Democrat
- Southern Democrat
- Deep South
- Upland South
- History of the Southern United States
- History of the United States Republican Party
- History of the United States Democratic Party
- Political culture of the United States
- Southern Agrarians
- Southernization
- Southern strategy

== Bibliography ==
- Avidit Acharya, Matthew Blackwell & Maya Sen. 2018. Deep Roots: How Slavery Still Shapes Southern Politics. Princeton University Press.
- Bartley, Numan V. The New South, 1945-1980 (1995), broad survey
- David A. Bateman, Ira Katznelson & John S. Lapinski. 2018. Southern Nation: Congress and White Supremacy after Reconstruction. Princeton University Press.
- Billington, Monroe Lee. The Political South in the 20th Century (Scribner, 1975). ISBN 0-684-13983-9.
- Black, Earl, and Merle Black. Politics and Society in the South (1989) excerpt and text search
- Bullock III, Charles S. and Mark J. Rozell, eds. The New Politics of the Old South: An Introduction to Southern Politics (2007) state-by-state coverage excerpt and text search
- Cunningham, Sean P. Cowboy Conservatism: Texas and the Rise of the Modern Right. (2010).
- Grantham. Dewey. The Democratic South (1965)
- Guillory, Ferrel, "The South in Red and Purple: Southernized Republicans, Diverse Democrats," Southern Cultures, 18 (Fall 2012), 6–24.
- Kazin, Michael. What It Took to Win: A History of the Democratic Party (2022)excerpt
- Key, V. O. and Alexander Heard. Southern Politics in State and Nation (1949), a famous classic
- Perman, Michael. Pursuit of Unity: A Political History of the American South (2009)
- Shafer, Byron E., and Richard Johnston. The End of Southern Exceptionalism: Class, Race, and Partisan Change in the Postwar South (2009) excerpt and text search
- Steed, Robert P. and Laurence W. Moreland, eds. Writing Southern Politics: Contemporary Interpretations and Future Directions (2006); historiography & scholarly essays excerpts & text search
- Tindall, George Brown. The Emergence of the New South, 1913-1945 (1967), influential survey
- Twyman, Robert W. and David C. Roller, ed. Encyclopedia of Southern History (LSU Press, 1979) ISBN 0-8071-0575-9.
- Woodard, J. David. The New Southern Politics (2006) 445pp
- Woodward, C. Vann. The Origins of the New South, 1877-1913 (1951), a famous classic
