= Sun Belt =

Region of the southern United States

The Sun Belt, highlighted in red

The Sun Belt is a region of the United States generally considered to stretch across the Southeast and Southwest. Another rough definition of the region is the area south of the Parallel 36°30′ north. Several climates can be found in the region—desert/semi-desert (Eastern California, Nevada, Arizona, New Mexico, Utah, and West Texas), Mediterranean (California), humid subtropical (Alabama, Mississippi, Louisiana, Florida, Georgia, South Carolina, North Carolina, Arkansas, Tennessee and Texas), and tropical (South Florida).

The Sun Belt has seen substantial population growth post-World War II from an influx of people seeking a warm and sunny climate, a surge in retiring baby boomers, and growing economic opportunities. The advent of air conditioning created more comfortable summer conditions and allowed more manufacturing and industry to locate in the Sun Belt. Because much of the construction in the Sun Belt is recent, housing styles and design are often modern and open. Recreational opportunities in the Sun Belt are not typically tied strictly to one season, and many tourist and resort cities in the region support a tourist industry year-round.

== Migration ==
Of cities with a population greater than 20,000 residents from July 2024 to July 2025, 10 of the top 15 fastest growing as a percentage of population and 11 of the top 15 in terms of largest numeric increase were located in the Sun Belt. Additionally, 86 percent of the top 50 zip codes that saw the largest increases in new residents since the start of the COVID-19 pandemic were in Texas, Florida, and Arizona. The traditional explanations for the growth are increasing productivity in the South and West and increasing demand for Sun Belt amenities, especially its pleasant weather. Job decline in the Rust Belt, along with rising cost of living in several Northeastern states, is another major reason for migration.

== Definition ==
The Sun Belt comprises the southern tier of the U.S., including the states of Alabama, Arizona, Florida, Georgia, Louisiana, Mississippi, New Mexico, South Carolina, Texas, roughly two-thirds of California (up to Greater Sacramento), and the southern parts of Arkansas, North Carolina, Nevada, Oklahoma, Tennessee, and Utah. Five of the states—Arizona, California, Florida, Nevada, and Texas—are sometimes collectively called the Sand States because of their abundance of beaches and/or deserts. Other definitions may also include parts of Colorado, Kansas, Missouri, and Virginia and most or all of Arkansas, North Carolina, Oklahoma and Tennessee. For example, the Kinder Institute for Urban Research defines the Sun Belt as being south of 36°30′N latitude, which includes all of Arkansas, most of Oklahoma and virtually all of Tennessee (small parts of East and Middle Tennessee extend north of 36°30′ due to surveying errors) but leaves out most of Nevada and California, with only Southern California and parts of Nye County and the Las Vegas Valley being included. This definition also includes most of the Missouri Bootheel.

First employed by political analyst Kevin Phillips in his 1969 book The Emerging Republican Majority, the term "Sun Belt" became synonymous with the southern third of the nation in the early 1970s. In this period, economic and political prominence shifted from the Midwest and Northeast to the South and West. Factors such as the warmer climate, the migration of workers from Mexico, and a boom in the agriculture industry allowed the southern third of the United States to grow economically. The climate spurred not only agricultural growth, but also the migration of many retirees to retirement communities in the region, especially in Florida and Arizona.

Industries such as aerospace, defense, and oil boomed in the Sun Belt as companies took advantage of the low involvement of labor unions in the region (due to more recent industrialization, 1930s–1950s) and the proximity of military installations that were major consumers of their products. The oil industry helped propel states such as Texas and Louisiana forward, and tourism grew in Florida, and Southern California. More recently, high tech and new economy industries have been major drivers of growth in California, Florida, Texas, and other parts of the Sun Belt. Texas and California rank among the top five states in the nation with the most Fortune 500 companies.

== Projections ==
In 2005, the U.S. Census Bureau projected that approximately 88% of the nation's population growth between 2000 and 2030 would occur in the Sun Belt. California, Texas, and Florida were each expected to add more than 12 million people during that time, which would make them by far the most populous states in America. Nevada, North Carolina, Arizona, Colorado, Georgia, Florida, South Carolina, and Texas were expected to be the fastest-growing states.

Events leading up to and including the 2008–2009 recession led some to question whether growth projections for the Sun Belt had been overstated. The economic bubble that led to the recession appeared, to some observers, to have been more acute in the Sun Belt than other parts of the country. Additionally, the traditional lure of cheaper labor markets in the region compared with America's older industrial centers has been eroded by overseas outsourcing trends.

One of the greatest threats facing the belt in the coming decades is water shortages. Communities in California are making plans to build multiple desalination plants to supply fresh water and avert near-term crises. Texas, Georgia, and Florida also face increasingly serious shortages because of their rapidly expanding populations and high per-capita water consumption.

Lingering effects from the Great Recession slowed, and in some places even stopped, the migration from the Frost Belt to the Sun Belt, according to data tracking people's movements over the year from July 2012 – 2013. Americans remained cautious about moving to a different state over this period. However, migration to the Sun Belt from the Frost Belt resumed again, according to 2015 Census data estimates, with growing migration to the Sun Belt and out of the Frost Belt. By the 2020s, the United States' fastest-growing cities were in Sun Belt states and, in addition to the US South, Americans favored the Sun Belt for relocation.

== Politics ==
The Sun Belt has historically been more conservative than the nation at large, especially in comparison to regions such as New England, the Pacific Northwest, and to a somewhat lesser extent, the Mid-Atlantic states and the Rust Belt. This has been attributed in part to the high percentage of evangelical Christians living in the region.

Increasing racial diversity and political realignment on urban/rural lines have made some Sun Belt states more competitive, though all states in the region excluding New Mexico and California continue to vote to the right of the national average.

Democratic presidential candidate Joe Biden narrowly won the states of Arizona and Georgia in the 2020 presidential election, and the party gained seats in both states in the Senate elections. In the 2024 presidential election, Donald Trump won the swing states of Arizona, North Carolina, Nevada, and Georgia.

== Environment ==
The environment in the belt is extremely valuable, not only to local and state governments, but to the federal government. Eight of the ten states have extremely high biodiversity (ranging from 3,800 to 6,700 species, not including marine life). The Sun Belt also has the highest number of distinct ecosystems: chaparral, deciduous, desert, grasslands, temperate rainforest, and tropical rainforest.

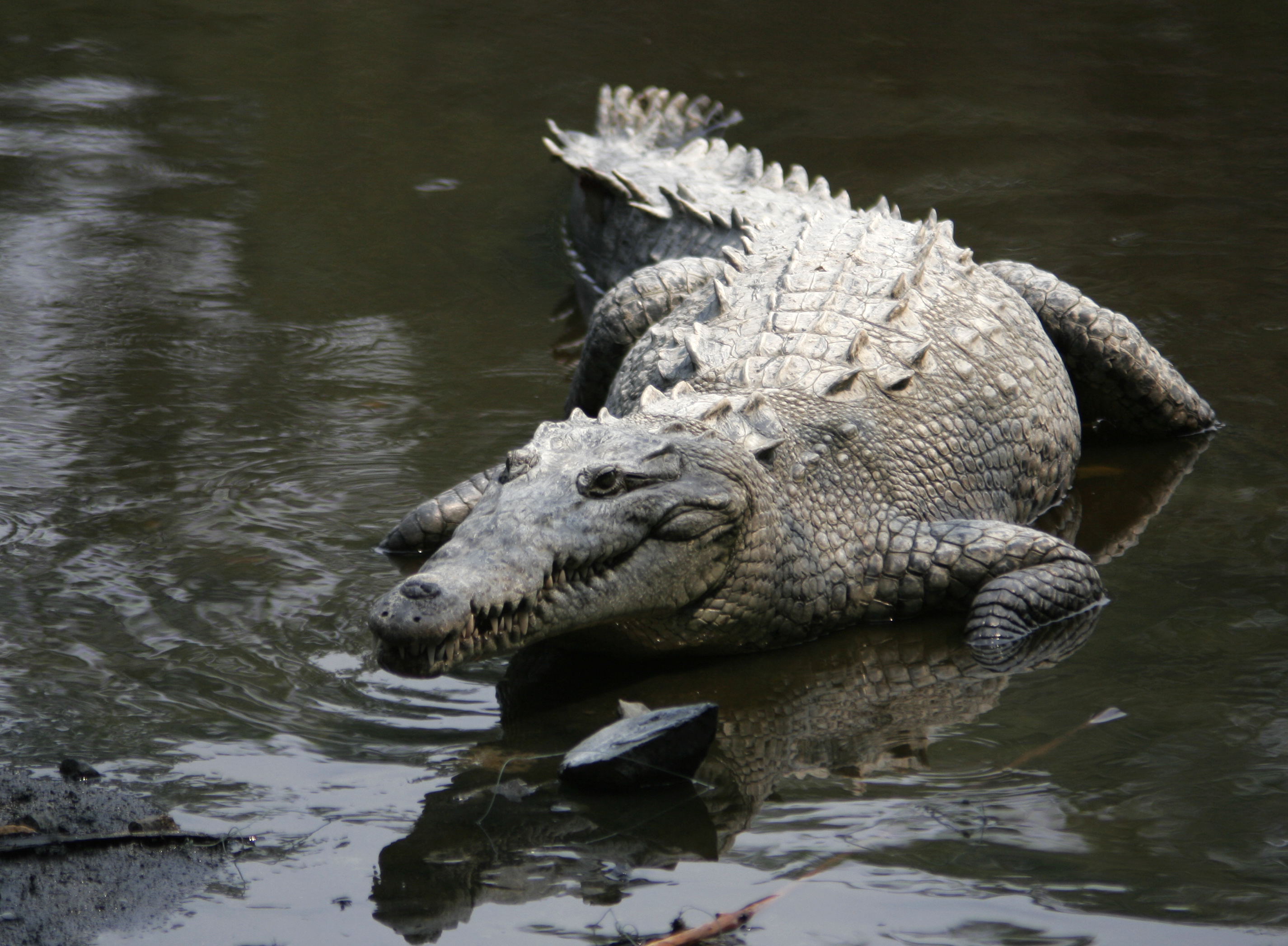
American crocodile, a vulnerable species found in Florida

Some endangered species live within the belt, including:

- American crocodile
- California condor
- Florida panther
- Fraser fir
- Longleaf pine
- Mexican wolf
- Red-cockaded woodpecker
- Red Hills salamander
- Sonoran pronghorn
- West Indian manatee
- Whooping crane

== Major cities ==
Largest Metropolitan Statistical Areas
Principal city	Metro Population (millions)	GMP (2022) (US$ billion)
Los Angeles	13.9	$1,227
Dallas–Fort Worth	7.9	$688.9
Houston	7.3	$633.5
Atlanta	6.2	$525.9
Miami	6.1	$483.8
Phoenix	5.0	$362.5
Riverside–San Bernardino	4.6	$237.9
San Francisco	4.6	$729.1
San Diego	3.2	$295.6
Tampa	3.3	$219.4
Charlotte	2.7	$228.9
Orlando	2.7	$194.5
San Antonio	2.6	$163.1
Sacramento	2.4	$176.3
Austin	2.4	$222.1
Las Vegas	2.3	$160.7
Nashville	2.1	$187.8
San Jose	1.9	$403.0
Jacksonville	1.7	$117.2
Corpus Christi	1.2	$58.2
New Orleans	1.2	$94.0
Tucson	1.0	$68.9

The five largest metropolitan statistical areas are Los Angeles, Dallas, Houston, Atlanta, and Miami. The Los Angeles area is by far the largest, with over 13 million inhabitants as of 2012. The ten largest metropolitan statistical areas are found in California, Texas, Georgia, North Carolina, Florida, and Arizona. Additionally, the cross-border metropolitan areas of San Diego-Tijuana and El Paso–Juárez lie partially within the Sun Belt. Seven of the ten largest cities in the U.S. are located in the Sun Belt: Los Angeles (2), Houston (4), Phoenix (6), San Antonio (7), San Diego (8), Dallas (9), and San Jose (10).

Major cities in the Sun Belt (south of 36°30'N)
State	City
Alabama	Birmingham, Dothan, Gulf Shores, Huntsville, Mobile, Montgomery, Tuscaloosa
Arizona	Phoenix, Tucson, Mesa, Marana, Buckeye, Chandler, Casa Grande, Glendale, Scottsdale, Gilbert, Tempe, Peoria, Paradise Valley, Queen Creek, Surprise, Yuma, Prescott, Flagstaff, Nogales
Arkansas	Bentonville, Fort Smith, Fayetteville, Hope, Hot Springs, Jonesboro, Little Rock, North Little Rock, Texarkana, West Memphis
California	Anaheim, Bakersfield, El Centro, Escondido, Fresno, Irvine, Long Beach, Los Angeles, Manteca, Modesto, Oakland, Palm Springs, Riverside, Sacramento, San Bernardino, San Diego, San Jose, San Francisco, Stockton, Santa Cruz, Santa Barbara
Florida	Cape Coral, Destin, Lakeland, Ft. Lauderdale, Gainesville, Jacksonville, Miami, Orlando, Naples, Pensacola, St. Petersburg, Sarasota, Tallahassee, Tampa, West Palm Beach
Georgia	Atlanta, Athens, Augusta, Brunswick, Columbus, Macon, Marietta, Pooler, Savannah, Valdosta, Warner Robins
Hawaii	Hilo, Honolulu
Louisiana	Alexandria, Baton Rouge, Bossier City, Kenner, Lafayette, Lake Charles, Metairie, Monroe, New Orleans, Shreveport
Mississippi	Jackson, Tupelo, Meridian, Gulfport, Southaven, Hattiesburg
New Mexico	Albuquerque, Deming, Las Cruces, Rio Rancho, Santa Fe
Nevada	Las Vegas, Henderson, North Las Vegas, Paradise, Spring Valley, Sunrise Manor, Enterprise
North Carolina	Asheville, Charlotte, Laurinburg, Gastonia, Greensboro, Hickory, Matthews, Morrisville, Mooresville, Pittsboro, Raleigh, Rocky Mount, Roanoke Rapids, Chapel Hill, Cary, Wilson, Sanford, Winston-Salem, Durham, Greenville (NC), Fayetteville, Wilmington, The Outer Banks (OBX)
Oklahoma	Broken Arrow, Durant, Edmond, Lawton, Moore, Muskogee, Norman, Oklahoma City, Shawnee, Tulsa
South Carolina	Charleston, Columbia, Greenville, Sumter, Myrtle Beach, Rock Hill, Spartanburg
Tennessee	Chattanooga, Cleveland Tenn., Cookeville, Franklin, Gatlinburg, Jackson Tenn., Johnson City, Knoxville, Memphis, Morristown, Murfreesboro, Nashville, Sevierville
Texas	Austin, Amarillo, Arlington, Buda, Beaumont, Brownsville, Celina, Corpus Christi, College Station, Dallas, Denton, El Paso, Ft. Worth, Frisco, Garland, Galveston, Houston, Irving, Killeen, Laredo, Lubbock, McAllen, Midland, McKinney, New Braunfels, Odessa, Plano, Prosper, Sherman, San Marcos, San Angelo, San Antonio, Sulphur Springs, Tyler, Temple, Texarkana, Waco, Waxahachie
Utah	St. George
Virginia	Bristol, Chesapeake, Danville, Hampton, Lynchburg, Martinsville, Norfolk, Newport News, Petersburg, Roanoke, Richmond, Salem, Virginia Beach

== See also ==
- Corn Belt
- Economy of the United States
- Northern Tier (United States), the northernmost states
- Rust Belt
- Snowbelt
- Southernization, refers to the political and cultural effects of the growth of the Sun Belt
- Sun Belt Conference
