= Second Redemption =

Period following the U.S. election of 1968

Second Redemption is a term that has been used regarding politics of the United States for the period following the election of 1968 characterized by more conservatism, and a retreat from governmental and judicial activism on issues of civil rights.

== See also ==
- White backlash
- Milliken v. Bradley (1974)
- Desegregation busing
- Reconstruction Era
- Redeemers
- Southern strategy
- American Civil War
- Civil Rights Movement
- Neoabolitionism
