= Northern United States =

- Region
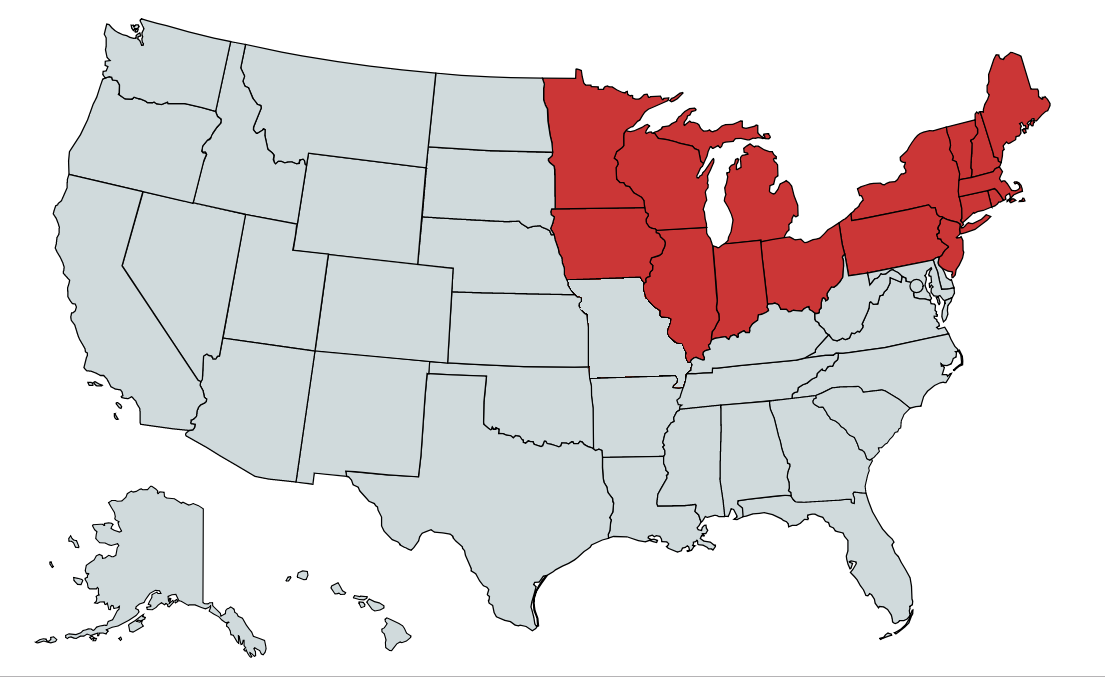
- Historically, especially in the time of the American Civil War the states in red were known as "the North".
- Country: United States
- States: Connecticut; Illinois; Indiana; Iowa; Kansas; Maine; Massachusetts; Michigan; Minnesota; New Hampshire; New Jersey; New York; Ohio; Pennsylvania; Rhode Island; Vermont; Wisconsin; Missouri; Nebraska; North Dakota; South Dakota
- Subregions: Northeastern United States; Midwestern United States

Area
  - Total: 625,897.06 sq mi (1,621,065.9 km^{2})
  - Land: 540,298.08 sq mi (1,399,365.6 km^{2})

Population (2019 est.)
  - Total: 111,736,936
  - Density: 206.80609/sq mi (79.848280/km^{2})
- Demonym: Northerner
- Largest city: New York City

The Northern United States, commonly referred to as the American North, the Northern States, or simply the North, is a geographical and historical region of the United States. The United States Census Bureau divides the North into the Midwest and Northeast, both of which have their own sub-regions. Historically, the issue which divided states into the North and South was the legality and moral legitimacy of slavery.

== History ==
=== Early history ===
Before the 19th-century westward expansion, the "Northern United States" corresponded to the present day New England region. By the 1830s it corresponded to the present day Northeast and Great Lakes region.

Before 1865, the North was distinguished from the South on the issue of slavery. In Southern states, slavery was legal until the ratification of the 13th Amendment in 1865. Northern states had all passed some form of legislation to abolish slavery by 1804. However, abolition did not mean freedom for some existing slaves. Due to gradual abolition laws, slaves would still appear in some Northern states as far as the 1840 United States census. New Jersey was the last Northern state to end slavery when the 13th Amendment was ratified in 1865, when the 15 elderly slaves that had not been freed by its gradual abolition law were freed.

=== American Civil War ===
Map of the division of the states during the American Civil War (1861–1865); states in blue represent northern Union states, those in light blue representing five largely Union-supporting border southern states that permitted slavery, known as border states, and both Missouri and Kentucky, which had competing Confederate and Unionist governments, and states in red representing southern seceded states, known as the Confederate States of America prior to the end of the American Civil War

During the American Civil War (1861–1865), the Northern states comprised the U.S. states that supported the United States of America, referred to as the Union. In this context, "the North" is synonymous with the Union, while "the South" refers to the states that seceded from the U.S. to form the Confederate States of America.

There is, however, some historical disagreement as to exactly which states comprised the North in the context of the Civil War as five slave-holding states largely remained with the Union: the southern border states of Missouri, Kentucky, West Virginia, Maryland, and Delaware, along with the disputed Indian Territory, though Missouri and Kentucky had dual competing Confederate and Unionist governments with the Confederate government of Kentucky and the Confederate government of Missouri and the Confederacy controlled more than half of Kentucky and the southern portion of Missouri early in the war. The Confederacy largely lost control in both states after 1862; depending on the source, some of these states and territories may be included in either region.

== Geography ==
=== Urban centers ===
Among the larger cities by population in the Northern United States are: New York City, Chicago, Philadelphia, Boston, Pittsburgh, Columbus, Indianapolis, Cleveland, Cincinnati, Omaha, St. Louis, Minneapolis, Kansas City, St. Paul, Wichita, Buffalo, Milwaukee, Detroit, and Des Moines.

The Northern United States also comprises most of the Northeast megalopolis, which is the most populated and urbanized megalopolis in the United States. The Great Lakes megalopolis is also located in the Northern United States, largely in the Great Lakes region and Midwest.

=== Climate ===
The Northern United States has a humid continental climate. Most of the Northern states have warm to hot summers and significant snowfall during the winter.

== Demonym ==
Northerners are sometimes referred to as Yankees, especially by Southerners.

== See also ==
=== Northern regions ===
- Northern Tier (United States)
- Flora of the Northern United States
- North American Arctic
- Upper Midwest

=== Other topics ===
- Southern United States
- Southeastern United States
- Southwestern United States
