= Neoabolitionism (race relations) =

Historiography term in race relations

Neoabolitionist (or neo-abolitionist or new abolitionism) is a term used in historiography to characterize historians of race relations motivated by the spirit of racial equality typified by the abolitionists who fought to abolish slavery in the mid-19th century. They write especially about African-American history, slavery in the United States, the American Civil War and the Reconstruction Era.

As abolitionists had worked in the 19th century to end slavery and provide equal rights under the US Constitution to African-Americans, the new activists worked to enforce constitutional rights for all citizens and restore equality under the law for African-Americans, including suffrage and civil rights.

In the late 20th century some historians emphasized the worlds of African-Americans in their own words, in their own communities, to recognize them as agents, not victims. Publishing in the mid-1960s and through the 20th century, a new generation of historians began to revise traditional accounts of slavery in the United States, reconstruction, racial segregation and Jim Crow laws. Some major historians began to apply the term "neoabolitionist" to such historians, and some of this group identified as such.

== Early 20th century: Dunning School ==
Many early 20th-century histories of the abolitionists and of the Reconstruction Era gave harsh assessments to the movement and the attempts by the federal government to force a transition in the South to a new social system. For instance, what was called the Dunning School, an influential group of white historians led by William Archibald Dunning at Columbia University, assessed Reconstruction as marred by African-American participation, claiming that the state legislatures of former Confederate states were dominated by freedmen who were incompetent to govern; that these freedmen were often manipulated by northern carpetbaggers; and that these postwar state governments were unusually corrupt. This was the view expressed in The Birth of a Nation (1915) and in Claude G. Bowers' best-selling The Tragic Era (1929).

In the 19th century after Reconstruction, former abolitionists, especially African Americans such as Frederick Douglass, presented positive views of its achievements: gaining of civil rights for African-Americans, and expanded suffrage to include poor whites. In the early 20th century, Fisk University historian Alrutheus Ambush Taylor described the period of Reconstruction in North Carolina and Tennessee in several books and articles, and in 1913 John R. Lynch, the former Speaker of the Mississippi House of Representatives published The Facts of Reconstruction, which argued directly against the Dunning School's interpretation of events in Mississippi. W. E. B. Du Bois, a leading Marxist historian, published his Black Reconstruction in America in 1935, challenging the Dunning School. Du Bois stressed biracial cooperation and noted the achievements of biracial Reconstruction legislatures: establishment of public education in the South for the first time, founding of hospitals, asylums, and charitable institutions to improve general welfare. He said the higher taxes were needed to finance the new infrastructure.

== New views of race and slavery ==
Beginning in the 1960s, historians writing about slavery, the Civil War and Reconstruction, emphasized the human advancement achieved by the abolition of slavery and the emancipation of those who had been enslaved. Historians such as James McPherson and Martin Duberman admired the abolitionists and wrote studies of them. Through the later 20th century, such historians as David W. Blight, Michael Les Benedict, James McPherson, John Hope Franklin, and Steven Hahn marshalled documentation to reject the Dunning School notion that the Reconstruction era was overwhelmingly corrupt. They evaluated the postwar period as not more corrupt than many times of social change and turmoil in American history.

John Hope Franklin argued that Reconstruction had positive elements, most significantly the enfranchisement of African-Americans, both those already free before the war and former slaves; the extension of citizenship and civil rights to four million African-Americans; and the introduction of public schools throughout the South where such schools generally had not existed. Franklin points to the founding of Howard and Fisk, historically black universities that educated generations, as two major successes of Reconstruction.

Historians have also looked at slavery in detail, including changes in ideas about relations between masters and enslaved, and the various forms of resistance the latter used. They have also studied the development of African-American communities, education, and political culture.

Historians argued that depriving African-Americans of suffrage and civil rights, as was done in the South following Reconstruction, was itself a terrible form of corruption. They considered it a violation of the tenets of representative government, as African Americans had been effectively excluded from political participation and public life for decades.

In his 1988 book Eric Foner dated the beginning of Reconstruction in 1863, emphasizing the significance of emancipation and the Emancipation Proclamation. His title, Reconstruction: America's Unfinished Revolution, 1863-1877 (1988), emphasized the "unfinished" theme in its subtitle, explicitly connecting Reconstruction to the American Revolution, which had been based on ideas about human liberty and equality. His work suggested that Reconstruction had not completed the work of providing equality and rights to all American citizens, even after constitutional amendments to provide freedmen with citizenship. That work was continuing in the 20th century. His book was published after the civil rights movement gained federal legislation to enforce constitutional rights of suffrage and equal treatment under the law for African-Americans and overturn state discrimination. Foner did not identify as a "neoabolitionist" in this work, nor did he refer to other historians by that term.

== Usage history ==
- The newly founded National Association for the Advancement of Colored People (NAACP) in 1910 called itself a "New Abolition Movement". Historian W. E. B. Du Bois often used the term, as did newspapers in writing about the organization.
- In 1952, Kenneth M. Stampp, discussing the new generation of revisionist historians of slavery (including himself), described them as "scholarly descendants of the northern abolitionists."
- In 1964, historian George Tindall said that in the 1920s, writer H. L. Mencken was the "guiding genius" behind "the neoabolitionist myth of the Savage South." That is, Mencken was breaking with the "Lost Cause" heroic image of the South and sharply criticizing it.
- In the early 1960s, says Peter Novick, many historians dedicated to racial equality "were called 'neo-abolitionists'--a not unfriendly characterization, and one which many so-designated embraced."
- Howard Zinn described SNCC activists in the Civil Rights Movement as the "new abolitionists" in the title of his 1964 book about the organization. Zinn did not use the term "neoabolitionist", nor did he apply the term to historians.
- In 1969, Don E. Fehrenbacher in the American Historical Review discussed "today's neoabolitionist historians, whose own social roles often intensify their sense of identity with the antislavery radicals."
- In 1974, C. Vann Woodward, a historian of the South, noted that, "by the 1950s a neoabolitionist mood prevailed among historians of slavery."
- In 1975, James McPherson's book, Abolitionist Legacy, used "neo-abolitionist" more than 50 times to characterize 20th-century activists and historians.
- In 1986, historian Jack Temple Kirby wrote, "Neo-abolitionist includes both popular and scholarly liberalism and black history in race relations imagery and scholarship, and a certain cynicism toward white southern elites."
- Noel Ignatiev and John Garvey use the term "new abolitionism" to refer to the "abolition of whiteness"; which is the cause the journal Race Traitor, which they coedit, is dedicated to.
- David W. Blight wrote in his book, Race and Reunion (2001):

In the end this is a story of how the forces of reconciliation overwhelmed the emancipationist vision in the national culture, how the inexorable drive for reunion both used and trumped race. But the story does not merely dead-end in the bleakness of the age of segregation; so much of the emancipationist vision persisted in American culture during the early twentieth century, upheld by African-Americans and a fledgling neo-abolitionist tradition, that it never died a permanent death on the landscape of Civil War memory. That persistence made the revival of the emancipationist memory of the war and the transformation of American society possible in the last third of the twentieth century.

- In 2003, the conservative National Review commented in 2003 "[t]his general perspective on the sectional conflict is already well represented by the Neoabolitionist school of Early American historians, and informs important works by scholars such as Paul Finkelman, Leonard Richards, Donald Robinson, and William Wiecek."
- According to historian Harvard Sitkoff in his 2001 article on books about African-American education, the term neoabolition or neo-abolitionist is sometimes considered derisive.
- Michael Fellman in his 2006 book wrote:

Starting in the late 1950s and continuing through the next decade, in tandem with the rise of the civil rights movement, many progressive historians reevaluated the abolitionists, even referring to the contemporary movement for change in America's perception of race as the "new abolitionism."

- Historian Christopher Metress in The American Historical Review in 2005 asserted, "the iconoclastic historian Stanley M. Elkins reinterpreted the rebellious slave as a neoabolitionist fantasy."
- Fredrickson in 2008 wrote that "the most thorough and influential of the neo-abolitionist works of the 1960s was James M. McPherson The Struggle for Equality: Abolitionist and the Negro in the Civil War and Reconstruction (1964)." He notes that much neo-abolitionist historiography "clearly sides with the radicals against Lincoln", and that in later works, McPherson was more sympathetic to Lincoln.
- Winthrop Jordan in his 2008 book on slavery and the South examines a contemporary group of "neo-abolitionist" historians who are "taking seriously again the critiques of Black and white abolitionists."
- Zeus Leonardo wrote in 2009 the term had uses beyond historiography, saying, "Neo-abolitionist pedagogy suggests that teachers and students work together to name, reflect on, and dismantle discourses of whiteness. It means disrupting white discourses and unsettling their codes."
- Allen C. Guelzo (2009) notes that Lincoln's hesitation regarding emancipation, "has earned him the execration of every abolitionist and neo-abolitionist, from Garrison to (most recently) Ebony editor Lerone Bennett, whose book Forced into Glory: Abraham Lincoln's White Dream depicts Lincoln as a callous white racist, the kind of fence straddler 'we find in almost all situations of oppression or it.'"
- In his 2010 study of 20th-century American literature, David Seed classifies the novel, This Child's Gonna Live (1969), by Sarah E Wright, as a "neo-abolitionist" novel that "borrows from Black nationalist discourse in its bold exploration of the loss of social ground gained in the Reconstruction South."
- Miller (2012) notes "the neo-abolitionist tone of nearly all the academic literature" on slavery.
- Abolitionism in the United States originally related to the abolition of slavery of African-descended peoples. In the 21st century, Lawrance and Roberts have applied the term "neoabolitionist" to opponents of contemporary sexual slavery, whose victims include people from every continent.
- In 2014, historian Yonatan Eyal argued that starting in the 1950s with Kenneth Stampp "the neo-abolitionist school diametrically flipped the views of the revisionists. It earned moral credibility in doing so, maturing as it did during the upheavals of the 1960s, yet at the same time lost the ability to explain the appeal of Union and compromise as formative influences on America's past." By 2008, Eyal continues: "More Americans identify with the Civil War as a struggle for a 'new birth of freedom,' rather than for the Union, and neo-abolitionist historiography has contributed to that sense over the past several decades."

== See also ==
- Second Redemption
- Second Reconstruction
- Redeemers
