= Southernization =

Observation of American Southern values

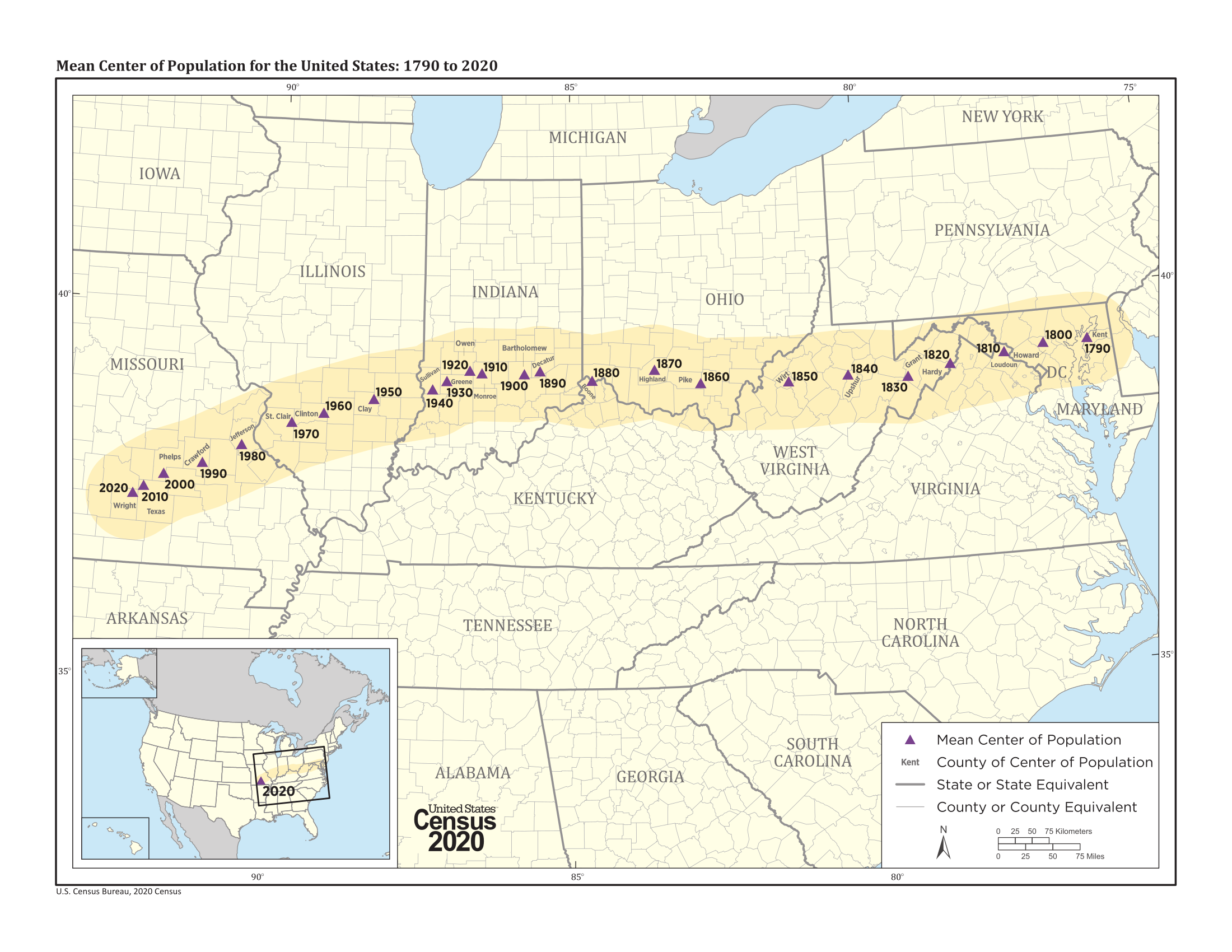
The mean center of the United States population has moved south since the 1920s.

In the culture of the United States, the idea of Southernization came from the observation that Southern values and beliefs had become more central to political success, reaching an apogee in the 1990s, with a Democratic President and Vice President from the South and Congressional leaders in both parties being from the South. Some commentators said that Southern values seemed increasingly important in national elections through the early 21st century. American journalists in the late 2000s used the term "Southernization" to describe the political and cultural effects. Southernization can also generally be used to explain, in history, the expansion of the southern Asia and Europe to a more advanced state of development.

== Description ==
Values and beliefs often ascribed to the American South include religious conservatism, particularly Protestantism, culture of honor, Southern hospitality, military tradition, agrarian ideals and American nationalism. Besides the cultural influence, some said that the South had infiltrated the national political stage.

In 1992, the winning presidential ticket consisted of Bill Clinton, the Governor of Arkansas; and Al Gore, a Senator from Middle Tennessee. From both parties, many leaders in Congress were also from the South. Meanwhile, according to Michael Lind, professor of public affairs at University of Texas at Austin, the Republican Party underwent its own Southernization as more Republican leaders called for policies and principles previously held by conservative or moderate Southern Democrats. Commentators such as Adam Nossiter and Michael Hirsh suggest that politics reached its apogee of Southernization in the 1990s.

Southernization of the national politics of the United States can be also noticed in presidential elections. From the Civil War until 1963 there was only one President from the Southern United States, Andrew Johnson, but since then five of the last eleven Presidents have been from the region: Lyndon B. Johnson, Jimmy Carter, George H. W. Bush, Bill Clinton, and George W. Bush.

== Other uses ==
In world history, the term "Southernization" has been used to describe the influence of south and southeast Asian civilizations on the rest of the world. Lynda Shaffer introduced the concept in her 1994 article of the same name, explaining that it is intended to be similar to the use of Westernization for the influence of the West on the rest of the world in the early modern and modern eras. Her ideas gained popularity with other World Historians and were included in college level textbooks. Examples of South Asian influence include Hindu–Arabic numerals; the spread of Buddhism; production and overseas trade of sugar, cotton and spices; and the spread of other inventions and discoveries.

The term Southernization has also been used to describe the rise of the Global South, a grouping of most non-Western countries.

The term Southernization has also been used to follow into beliefs like Westernization from the Industrial Revolution, as seen in the article "Southernization" by Shaffer.

== See also ==
- Culture of the Southern United States
- Political culture of the United States
- Politics of the Southern United States
- Red states and blue states
- Sun Belt, the growth of the Sun Belt coincided with the process of Southernization
- Flyover country
