= Lillian Smith Book Award =

Lillian Smith Book Award emblem

The Lillian Smith Book Awards' are an award which honors those authors who, through their outstanding writing about the American South, carry on Lillian Smith's legacy of elucidating the condition of racial and social inequity and proposing a vision of justice and human understanding. The award is jointly presented by the Southern Regional Council and the University of Georgia Libraries.

Since 1968, the awards have been presented annually, except for 2003 when the Southern Regional Council experienced funding shortfalls. It is the South's oldest and best-known book award, and is presented in fiction and non-fiction categories.

== Past honorees ==
=== 1968 winner ===
- George B. Tindall for The Emergence of the New South: 1913-1945, Louisiana State University Press.

=== 1969 winner ===
- Dan T. Carter for Scottsboro: A Tragedy of the American South, Louisiana State University Press.

=== 1970 winner ===
- Paul M. Gaston for The New South Creed: A Study in Southern Mythmaking, Alfred A. Knopf.

=== 1971 winner ===
- Anthony Dunbar for Our Land, Too, Pantheon Books.

=== 1972 winner ===
- Robert Coles for Children of Crisis, Vol. II: Migrants, Sharecroppers, Mountaineers, and Volume III: The South Goes North, Little, Brown and Company.

=== 1973 winners ===
- Harold Martin for Ralph McGill, Reporter, Little Brown and Company.
- Alice Walker for Revolutionary Petunias and Other Poems, Harcourt Brace Jovanovich.

=== 1974 winners ===
- C. Vann Woodward for The Strange Career of Jim Crow, Oxford University Press.
- Albert Murray for Train Whistle Guitar, McGraw-Hill.

=== 1976 winners ===
- James W. Loewen and Charles Sallis for Mississippi: Conflict and Change, Pantheon Books.
- Reynolds Price for The Surface of Earth, Atheneum.

=== 1977 winners ===
- Alex Haley for Roots, Doubleday.
- Richard Kluger for Simple Justice: The History of Brown v. Board of Education and Black America's Struggle for Equality, Alfred A. Knopf.

=== 1978 winners ===
- Will D. Campbell for Brother to a Dragonfly, The Seabury Press.
- Garrett Epps for The Shad Treatment, Putnam.

=== 1979 winners ===
- Marion Wright and Arnold Shankman for Human Rights Odyssey, Moore Publishing.
- Ernest J. Gaines for In My Father's House, Alfred A. Knopf.

=== 1980 winners ===
- Jacquelyn Dowd Hall for Revolt Against Chivalry: Jessie Daniel Ames and the Women's Campaign Against Lynching, Columbia University Press.
- Cormac McCarthy for Suttree, Random House.

=== 1981 winners ===
- John Gaventa for Power and Powerlessness: Quiescence and Rebellion in an Appalachian Valley, University of Illinois Press.
- Pat Conroy for The Lords of Discipline, Houghton Mifflin.

=== 1982 winners ===
- Harry S. Ashmore for Hearts and Minds: The Anatomy of Racism from Roosevelt to Reagan, McGraw-Hill.
- John Ehle for The Winter People, Harper & Row.

=== 1983 winners ===
- Fred Hobson for South-Watching: Selected Essays by Gerald W. Johnson, University of North Carolina Press.
- Roy Hoffman for Almost Family, Dial Press.

=== 1984 winners ===
- John Egerton for Generations: An American Family, University of Kentucky Press.
- Alice Walker for In Search of Our Mothers' Gardens: Womanist Prose, Harcourt Brace Jovanovich.
- Eudora Welty - Special Lifetime Award.

=== 1985 winners ===
- James Farmer for Lay Bare the Heart: An Autobiography of the Civil Rights Movement, Arbor House.
- Peter Taylor for The Old Forest and Other Stories, Dial Press.

=== 1986 winner ===
- A. G. Mojtabai for Blessed Assurance: At Home with the Bomb in Amarillo, Texas, Houghton Mifflin.

=== 1987 winners ===
- Thomas L. Johnson, and Phillip C. Dunn (ed.) for A True Likeness: The Black South of Richard Samuel Roberts, 1920–1936, Algonquin Books.
- Pauli Murray for Song in a Weary Throat: An American Pilgrimage, Harper & Row.
- Mary Hood for And Venus is Blue: Stories, Ticknor & Fields.

=== 1988 winners ===
- Melton A. McLaurin for Separate Pasts: Growing Up White in the Segregated South, University of Georgia Press.
- C. Eric Lincoln for The Avenue: Clayton City, Morrow.

=== 1989 winners ===
- Melany Neilson for Even Mississippi, University of Alabama Press.
- Madison Smartt Bell for Soldier's Joy, Ticknor & Fields.
- Gloria Naylor for Mama Day, Ticknor & Fields.

=== 1990 winners ===
- Wayne Flynt for Poor But Proud: Alabama's Poor Whites, University of Alabama Press.
- Dori Sanders for Clover: A Novel, Algonquin Books.

=== 1991 winners ===
- J. L. Chestnut Jr., and Julia Cass for Black in Selma : The Uncommon Life of J.L. Chestnut, Jr.: Politics and Power in a Small American Town, Farrar, Straus & Giroux.
- Mary Ward Brown for Tongues of Flame, E.P. Dutton.

=== 1992 winners ===
- Marian Wright Edelman for The Measure of Our Success: A Letter to My Children and Yours, Beacon Press.
- Melissa Fay Greene for Praying for Sheetrock, Addison-Wesley.
- Denise Giardina for The Unquiet Earth, W. W. Norton & Company.

=== 1993 winners ===
- Charles W. Eagles for Outside Agitator: Jon Daniels and the Civil Rights Movement in Alabama, University of North Carolina Press.
- William Baldwin for The Hard To Catch Mercy, Algonquin Books of Chapel Hill.
- Margaret Rose Gladney for How Am I To Be Heard? Letters of Lillian Smith, University of North Carolina Press.

=== 1994 winners ===
- John Gregory Brown for Decorations in a Ruined Cemetery, Houghton Mifflin Company.
- Henry Louis Gates Jr. for Colored People, Alfred A. Knopf.
- John Dittmer for Local People: The Struggle for Civil Rights in Mississippi, University of Illinois Press.

=== 1995 winners ===
- Charles M. Payne for I've Got the Light of Freedom: The Organizing Tradition and the Mississippi Freedom Struggle, University of California Press.
- Adam Fairclough for Race & Democracy: The Civil Rights Struggle in Louisiana, 1915-1972, University of Georgia Press.
- Mary Lee Settle for Choices, Nan A. Talese/Doubleday.

=== 1996 winners ===
- Michael D'Orso for Like Judgment Day: The Ruin and Redemption of a Town Called Rosewood, Grosset/Putnam.
- Constance W. Curry for Silver Rights, Algonquin Books of Chapel Hill.
- Anthony Grooms for Trouble No More, La Questa.

=== 1997 winners ===
- John M. Barry for The Great Mississippi Flood of 1927 and How It Changed America, Simon & Schuster.
- Charles Frazier for Cold Mountain, Atlantic Monthly Press.

=== 1998 winners ===
- John Lewis for Walking with the Wind: A Memoir of the Movement, with Michael D'Orso, Simon & Schuster.
- Elizabeth Cox for Night Talk, Graywolf Press.

=== 1999 winners ===
- J. Morgan Kousser for Colorblind Injustice: Minority Voting Rights and the Undoing of the Second Reconstruction, University of North Carolina Press.
- Leroy Davis for A Clashing of the Soul: John Hope and the Dilemma of African-American Leadership and Black Higher Education in the Early Twentieth Century, University of Georgia Press.

=== 2000 winners ===
- Lawrence N. Powell for Troubled Memory: Anne Levy, The Holocaust, and David Duke's Louisiana, University of North Carolina Press.
- Andrew M. Manis for A Fire You Can't Put Out: The Civil Rights Life of Birmingham's Reverend Fred Shuttlesworth, University of Alabama Press.
- Michael Keith Honey for Black Workers Remember: An Oral History of Segregation, Unionism and the Freedom Struggle, University of California Press.

=== 2001 winners ===
- Hal Crowther for Cathedrals of Kudzu: A Personal Landscape of the South, Louisiana State University Press.
- Pam Durban for So Far Back, Picador USA.
- Robert P. "Bob" Moses, Charles E. Cobb Jr. for Radical Equations, Beacon Press.
- Natasha Trethewey for Domestic Work, Graywolf Press.

=== 2002 winners ===
- Anthony Grooms for Bombingham, Free Press.
- Mark Newman for Getting Right with God: Southern Baptists and Desegregation, 1945-1995, University of Alabama Press
- Keith Wailoo for Dying in the City of the Blues: Sickle Cell Anemia and the Politics of Race and Health, University of North Carolina Press.
- William H. Chafe, Raymond Gavins, and Robert Korstad editors, with Paul Ortiz, Nicole Waligora-Davis, Robert Parrish, Jennifer Ritterhouse, Keisha Roberts, Remembering Jim Crow: African Americans Tell About Life in the Segregated South, The New Press.

=== 2004 winners ===
- Barbara Ransby for Ella Baker and the Black Freedom Movement; A Radical Democratic Vision, University of North Carolina Press.
- Elizabeth R. Varon for Southern Lady, Yankee Spy: The True Story of Elizabeth Van Lew, A Union Agent in the Heart of the Confederacy, Oxford University Press.
- Frank X. Walker for Buffalo Dance, The Journey of York, The University Press of Kentucky.

=== 2005 winners ===
- Stephanie Camp for Closer to Freedom: Enslaved Women and Everyday Resistance in the Plantation South, University of North Carolina Press.
- Frye Gaillard for Cradle of Freedom: Alabama and the Movement that Changed America, University of Alabama Press.
- Tayari Jones for The Untelling: A Novel, Time Warner Book Group.

=== 2006 winners ===
- Heather A. Williams for Self-Taught: African American Education in Slavery and Freedom, University of North Carolina Press.
- W. Fitzhugh Brundage for The Southern Past: A Clash of Race and Memory, Belknap Press of Harvard University Press.

=== 2007 winners ===
- Natasha Trethewey for Native Guard, Houghton Mifflin Co.
- Matthew D. Lassiter for The Silent Majority: Suburban Politics In the Sunbelt South Princeton University Press.

=== 2008 winners ===
- Joseph Crespino for In Search of Another Country: Mississippi and the Conservative Counterrevolution Princeton University Press.
- Wesley C. Hogan for Many Minds, One Heart: SNCC's Dream for a New America University of North Carolina Press.

=== 2009 winners ===
- Areila Gross for What Blood Won't Tell: A History of Race on Trial in America Harvard University Press.
- Bob Zellner with Constance W. Curry for The Wrong Side of Murder Creek: A White Southerner in the Freedom Movement NewSouth Books, Inc.

=== 2010 winners ===
- Amy Louise Wood, for Lynching and Spectacle: Witnessing Racial Violence in America, 1890-1940, University of North Carolina Press
- Charles W. Eagles, for The Price of Defiance: James Meredith and the Integration of Ole Miss, University of North Carolina Press

=== 2011 winners ===
- Steve Lerner, for Sacrifice Zones: The Front Lines of Toxic Chemical Exposure in the United States, The MIT Press
- Danielle McGuire, for At the Dark End of the Street: Black Women, Rape, and Resistance-A New History of the Civil Rights Movement From Rosa Parks to the Rise of Black Power, Alfred A. Knopf

=== 2012 winners ===
- Tomiko Brown-Nagin, for Courage to Dissent: Atlanta and the Long History of the Civil Right Movement, Oxford University Press
- John C. Inscoe, for Writing the South Through the Self: Explorations in Southern Autobiography, University of Georgia Press

=== 2013 winners ===
- Randal Maurice Jelks, for Benjamin Elijah Mays, Schoolmaster of the Movement: a Biography, University of North Carolina Press
- Francoise N. Hamlin, for Crossroads at Clarkdale: The Black Freedom Struggle in the Mississippi Delta after World War II, University of North Carolina Press

=== 2014 winners ===
- Bernard Lafayette Jr., for In Peace and Freedom, My Journey in Selma, University Press of Kentucky
- M. J. O'Brien, for We Shall Not Be Moved: The Jackson Woolworth's Sit-In and the Movement It Inspired, University Press of Mississippi

=== 2015 winners ===
- Lee W. Formwalt, for Looking Back, Moving Forward: The Southwest Georgia Freedom Struggle, 1814-2014, Albany Civil Rights Institute and Georgia Humanities Council
- Andrew Maraniss, for Strong Inside: Perry Wallace and the Collision of Race and Sports in the South, Vanderbilt University Press

=== 2016 winners ===
- Cheryl Knott, for Not Free, Not For All: Public Libraries in the Age of Jim Crow, University of Massachusetts Press
- Minion K. C. Morrison, for Aaron Henry of Mississippi: Inside Agitator, University of Arkansas Press

=== 2017 winners ===
- Patricia Bell-Scott, for The Firebrand and the First Lady, Alfred A. Knopf
- Risa Goluboff, for Vagrant Nation, Oxford University Press

=== 2018 winners ===
- James Forman Jr., for Locking Up Our Own: Crime and Punishment in Black America, Farrar, Straus and Giroux
- Nancy MacLean, for Democracy in Chains: The Deep History of the Radical Right's Stealth Plan for America, Viking/Penguin Books

=== 2019 winners ===
- Rachel Devlin for A Girl Stands at the Door: The Generation of Young Women Who Desegregated America's Schools, Hachette Book Group
- Vanessa Siddle Walker for The Lost Education of Horace Tate: Uncovering the Hidden Heroes Who Fought for Justice in Schools, The New Press
- Virginia Eubanks for Automating Inequality: How High-Tech Tools Profile, Police, and Punish the Poor, St. Martin's Press

=== 2020 winners ===
- Jelani M. Favors, for Shelter in a Time of Storm: How Black Colleges Fostered Generations of Leadership and Activism, University of North Carolina Press
- Brandon K. Winford, for John Hervey Wheeler, Black Banking, and the Economic Struggle for Civil Rights, University Press of Kentucky

=== 2021 winners ===
- William A. Darity Jr. and A. Kirsten Mullen, for From Here to Equality: Reparations for Black Americans in the Twenty-first Century, University of North Carolina Press
- Lawrence Goldstone, for On Account of Race: The Supreme Court, White Supremacy, and the Ravaging of American Voting Rights, Counterpoint Press

=== 2022 winners ===
- Mia Bay for Traveling Black: A Story of Race and Resistance, Harvard University Press
- Jocelyn Nicole Johnson for My Monticello, Henry Holt & Co.

=== 2023 winners ===
- Linda Villarosa for Under the Skin: The Hidden Toll of Racism on American Lives and on the Health of Our Nation, Penguin Random House
- Tomiko Brown-Nagin for Civil Rights Queen: Constance Baker Motley and the Struggle for Equality, Pantheon Books
