= A Torchlight for America =

Religious text by Louis Farrakhan

A Torchlight for America is a religious text of the Nation of Islam, written by Louis Farrakhan.

== History ==
Farrakhan gave a speech titled A Torchlight for America on October 18, 1992, at the Georgia Dome with 55,000 people attending. In 1993, Farrakhan publish an expanded form of the speech through FCN Publishing.

The book is anti-prison, suggesting that rehabilitation is best achieved through Islam, in particular for Black Muslims. It also refers to the teachings of Elijah Muhammad as an important source for remedying crime and drug addiction.

== Reviews ==
Mattias Gardell described A Torchlight for America as Farrakhan's "vision to rid America of classism, racism, and sexism".

In his text, Terror and triumph: the nature of Black religion, Anthony B. Pinn writes that Farrakhan's work "connotes a mainstream take on national developments. This is the case because it highlights problems within the American system that many outside the Nation of Islam would recognize as valid points of discussion, based on a system of ethics and morality, of corporate accountability, not uncommon in dominant political discourse."

C. Eric Lincoln, the author of The Black Muslims in America, wrote that "the essence of Farrakhan is formally spelled out" in A Torchlight for America

Cornel West called the text, "a call for dialogue."

Gilles Kepel wrote that, in his text, Farrakhan "presented the community model of the Black Muslims as an example for the whole of the country, which he envisaged as a series of communities living side by side."

== Controversy ==
The text has been controversial due to its opposition to homosexuality and abortion. Farrakhan writes that, "We must change homosexual behavior and get rid of the circumstances that bring it about." In the text, Farrakhan also equates abortion to murder.
