= Mary Fainsod Katzenstein =

American political scientist

- Occupation: Political scientist
- Awards: Victoria Schuck Award, APSA; Heinz I. Eulau Award, APSA; Frank Johnson Goodnow Award, APSA
- Scientific career
- Fields: Political science

Mary Fainsod Katzenstein is an American political scientist. She is the Stephen and Evalyn Milman Professor of American Studies, Emerita at Cornell University. She specializes in prison reform in the United States, the history of American feminist activism, and the politics of India.

== Career ==
By 2015, the year of her retirement to emerita status, Katzenstein had published seven books and 39 articles. Katzenstein was the sole author of the 1979 book Ethnicity & Equality the Shiv Sena Party. The book studies the conditions under which nativist ideas can be organized into coherent political movements, using the case of the Hindu nationalist Shiv Sena Party in 1960s India.

In 1998, Katzenstein published the book Faithful and Fearless: Moving Feminist Protest inside the Church and the Military. In Faithful and Fearless, Katzenstein demonstrates how the feminist protests of the 1960s in the United States, which began outside of official political institutions, had by the 1990s transformed into a movement that largely took place inside the mainstream of American political institutions. Faithful and Fearless won the 1999 Victoria Schuck Award from the American Political Science Association, which honors the best book published on the topic of women and politics each year.

From 2001 to 2002, Katzenstein was the recipient of a Russell Sage Foundation grant to study how federal government policy in the US has impacted the growth of prisons. The study included the effects of policies such as mandatory minimum sentencing laws for the possession of certain drugs, or restricting access to Pell grants.

Volumes that Katzenstein co-edited include Beyond Zero Tolerance; Discrimination and the Culture of the US Military, with Judith Reppy (1999), and Social Movements in India: Poverty, Power, and Politics, with Raka Ray (2005).

Katzenstein's article "The Dark Side of American Liberalism and Felony Disenfranchisement", published with Leila Mohsen Ibrahim and Katherine Rubin in Perspectives on Politics in 2010, received the 2011 Heinz I. Eulau Award from the American Political Science Association for the best journal article published in Perspectives on Politics. Together with Minion K. C. Morrison, Katzenstein also received the 2015 Frank Johnson Goodnow Award from the American Political Science Association, a lifetime award that "honors service to the community of teachers, researchers, and public servants who work in the many fields of politics."

Katzenstein has been a leader of the Cornell Prison Education Program and an instructor in that program, which provides courses to inmates at prisons in Upstate New York. Katzenstein has written articles in the public media about US prison reform, including pieces in the Boston Review, and The Washington Post, and her work on Indian politics has been cited in outlets like The Economic Times and The Indian Express.

== Selected works ==
- Ethnicity & Equality the Shiv Sena Party (1979)
- Faithful and Fearless: Moving Feminist Protest inside the Church and the Military (1998)
- Beyond Zero Tolerance; Discrimination and the Culture of the US Military, with Judith Reppy (1999)
- Social Movements in India: Poverty, Power, and Politics, edited with Raka Ray (2005)

== Selected awards ==
- Victoria Schuck Award, American Political Science Association (1999)
- Russell Sage Foundation researcher (2001–2002)
- Heinz I. Eulau Award, American Political Science Association (2011)
- Frank Johnson Goodnow Award, American Political Science Association (2015)
- Grain of Sand Award, Interpretive Methodologies and Methods Section, American Political Science Association (2021)
