= Andrew Manis =

American historian

Andrew Michael Manis (born February 23, 1954, in Birmingham, Alabama) is a historian, author, and professor at Middle Georgia State University in Macon, Georgia.

An ordained Baptist minister, Manis was educated at Samford University (B.A. in Religion and History) and at the Southern Baptist Theological Seminary in Louisville, Kentucky, where he earned a Master of Divinity and a Ph.D. in American Church History in 1984. He also studied briefly at the University of Chicago Divinity School. From 1985 to 1988, he was the first Protestant scholar to teach in the Theology Department at Xavier University of (New Orleans) Louisiana, and prior to teaching at Macon State College, he taught at Averett University in Danville, Virginia.

Manis' research focuses on the role of religion in American life, with particular attention placed on the Civil Rights Movement. Manis received the Lillian Smith Book Award from the Southern Regional Council for his book, A Fire You Can't Put Out. The book, a biography of civil rights leader Rev. Fred Shuttlesworth, was also nominated for the Robert F. Kennedy Prize, and was runner-up for the 2001 Louisville Grawemeyer Award for books in religion.

In 2009, Manis was selected as a Fulbright Fellow in Greece, where he was also Visiting Professor of American Studies at Aristotle University of Thessaloniki.

== Publications ==
- Eavesdropping on the Most Segregated Hour: A City's Clergy Reflect on Racial Reconciliation" (with Sandy Dwayne Martin, co-editor). Macon: Mercer University Press, 2021.
- Macon Black and White: An Unutterable Separation in the American Century. Macon: Mercer University Press/Tubman African American Museum, 2004.
  Winner of the 2005 Georgia Author of the Year Award (History Division)
  National Semifinalist for the 2005 Robert F. Kennedy Book Award
- Southern Civil Religions in Conflict: Civil Rights and the Culture Wars. Mercer University Press, 2002, which is a revised and expanded edition of his 1987 book. [See below.]
- A Fire You Can't Put Out: The Civil Rights Life of Birmingham's Reverend Fred Shuttlesworth. University of Alabama Press, 2001.
- Birmingham Revolutionaries: Fred Shuttlesworth and the Alabama Christian Movement for Human Rights. Contributor and Co-editor with Marjorie White. Mercer University Press, 2000.
- Southern Civil Religions in Conflict: Black and White Baptists and Civil Rights, 1947-1957. University of Georgia Press, 1987.

== Awards and honors ==
- Finalist, Georgia Author of the Year Award, Inspirational Division, for Eavesdropping on the Most Segregated Hour, 2022.
- Research Grant for Researchers, Louisville Institute, 2020.
- Faculty Award for Outstanding Work in Diversity and Inclusion, 2020.
- Faculty Award for Outstanding Scholarly Activity, Macon State College, 2001.
- Mellon Fellow in the Humanities, University of Pennsylvania, Philadelphia, Pennsylvania, 1988‑1989.
- Research Fellowship, Pew Evangelical Scholars Program, University of Notre Dame, 1994‑1995 (One of fourteen recipients chosen from among 275 applicants nationwide)
- Recipient, Fellowship for Younger Scholars, Center for the Study of Religion and American Culture, Indiana University/Purdue University at Indianapolis 1992‑1993.
