= Anthony Grooms =

American writer

Anthony Grooms, originally from Louisa, Virginia, has written several pieces of literature and has won many awards for his writings. Grooms is now a professor at Kennesaw State University, near Atlanta, Georgia, and teaches creative writing and other English courses.

== Biography ==
Anthony “Tony” Grooms was born January 15, 1955, and grew up in Louisa, Virginia. He is the oldest of six children in his African-American family, which also has Native American and European backgrounds. His parents, Robert E. Grooms and Dellaphine Scott, promoted education, so Grooms became a part of the Freedom of Choice plan. He attended a white public school in 1967 consisting of partial integration, and his experience there has had a significant influence on his writing.

Graduating in 1978 from the College of William and Mary in Williamsburg, Virginia, Anthony Grooms received a Bachelor of Arts in theatre and speech. He strived for a more advanced education and graduated in 1984 from George Mason University with a Masters of Fine Arts in English. He has taught at a variety of schools: Clark State University, University of Georgia, University of Cape Coast in Ghana, West Africa, and Kennesaw State University. Grooms has always been a writer, but he never considered himself one until graduate school. He moved to Atlanta, Georgia, in 1988 after first finishing graduate school and then marrying Pamela B. Jackson. In Atlanta, he found the civil rights movement during the 1960s as a basis for his writing. Grooms is now an instructor teaching creative writing, along with other English and literature courses, at Kennesaw State University outside of Atlanta, Georgia.

Grooms has received many awards for his writings: the Lillian Smith Prize for Fiction (twice), the Sokolov Scholarship of the Bread Loaf Writers' Conference, the Lamar lectureship of Wesleyan College, and an Arts Administration Fellowship by the National Endowment for the Arts. In 2006, the Georgia Center of the Book chose two of Grooms’ published works, Ice Poems and Trouble No More, for “Top 25 List of Books all Georgians should Read.”

== Literary works ==
Anthony Grooms is an author of published writings covering a variety of subjects, but his best-known piece of literature, Bombingham, is a novel addressing issues faced during the civil rights movement in the 1960s. Other works of writing include Ice Poems, an assortment of poems, and Trouble No More, an assortment of short stories. His stories and poems have appeared in leading literary journals including Callaloo, African American Review, and Crab Orchard Review.

Mr. Grooms also wrote about his relationship with Pat Conroy in “The World Is Wider Than the Water It Holds” pp 248–252, Our Prince of Scribes, edited by Nicole Seitz and Jonathan Haupt, University of Georgia Press, 2018.
