= The Half Has Never Been Told: Slavery and the Making of American Capitalism =

2014 book by Edward E. Baptist

- Author: Edward E. Baptist
- Language: English
- Subject: United States History
- Publisher: Basic Books
- Publication date: 2014
- Publication place: United States
- Pages: 498
- Awards: 2015 Hillman Prize; 2015 Avery O. Craven Award
- ISBN: 978-046500296-2

The Half Has Never Been Told: Slavery and the Making of American Capitalism is a book by Edward E. Baptist published in 2014 by Basic Books. Baptist makes the argument that slavery played an essential role in the development of American capitalism, and that enslavers and slave traders were entrepreneurs in a capitalist context. They used enslaved people not just as the economic engine for the production of cotton, the dominant global commodity of the time, but also as collateral to finance the economic development of the nation.

Among the themes explored in the book are the expansion and practices of chattel slavery, illustrated with both stories of individual enslaved people, based on personal histories such as the autobiography of Charles Ball, and composite stories constructed from a variety of sources in the style of evocative history, as well as statistics and maps showing changes across time; how letters of credit and banks fueled land speculation and the westward expansion of slavery in the Old Southwest; and the roles of New Orleans and the Haitian Revolution in these changes. Historical figures with roles in Baptist's examination of this history include Thomas Jefferson, Andrew Jackson, Nicholas Biddle, John C. Calhoun, Henry Clay, and Abraham Lincoln.

== Awards ==
For this book Baptist received the 2015 Hillman Prize, which gave this description of his work:

Told through intimate slave narratives, plantation records, newspapers, and the words of politicians, entrepreneurs, and escaped slaves, The Half Has Never Been Told offers a radical new interpretation of American history. It forces readers to reckon with the violence at the root of American supremacy, but also with the survival and resistance that brought about slavery’s end—and created a culture that sustains America’s deepest dreams of freedom.

He also received the Organization of American Historians' 2015 Avery O. Craven Award, which was renamed the Civil War and Reconstruction Book Award in July 2020.

== Reception ==
=== Reviews ===
Writing in The New York Times Book Review Eric Foner concluded the book's underlying argument was persuasive even though some of its elements were "not entirely pulled together," and Kirkus Reviews found it to be a "dense, myth-busting work" that presents "a complicated story involving staggering scholarship that adds greatly to our understanding of the history of the United States. T. W. Walker's review in Monthly Review offered a labor-history perspective on the book, while Paul Harvey in The Christian Century found the book to be "one of the richest and most provocative accounts of American slavery I have ever read." In The American Interest Paul DeRosa described the book as "a prodigious work that stacks up a mountain of documentary evidence." Essence named this book its choice for the Best Book of 2014 for History.

The many reviews published in academic and historical society journals offered a range of opinions. Matthew Pratt Guterl, writing in the Journal of Southern History, stated that the book "should be read and debated by anyone who writes about the South, or about American capitalism, or about African American culture," while Mark Wilson writing in the North Carolina Historical Review expressed his view that the book "aspires to greatness but falls short of the mark," and in The Historian Matthew Crocker wrote, "Baptist has written an important book that is also indicative of a current trend in historiography that takes a highly critical view of the development of modern capitalism." Additional perspectives were expressed by reviews in The Chronicle of Higher Education by Marc Parry, The American Historical Review by George William Van Cleve, the Virginia Magazine of History and Biography by R. B. Bernstein, The Journal of American History by Diana Ramey Berry, and The History Teacher by Timothy Buchner.

Derek Sanderson, writing in Library Journal, declared that "professional historians and lay readers will pore over this book for years to come. Essential for all readers interested in American history and the history of slavery." Reviews in the library and publishing industry press also appeared in Publishers Weekly and Booklist.

=== Controversy over review in The Economist ===
On 4 September 2014 The Economist published a review of The Half Has Not Been Told on its website that elicited so much public criticism that the magazine pulled the review from its website the next day, although the original review remained accessible elsewhere on the site. The withdrawn review also appeared in the 6 Sep 2014 print edition of The Economist.

Reports on criticism of the initial review appeared on Vox and the websites of The Atlantic and The Washington Post. An extended discussion of the matter by Ari Kelman was published in an article in The Times Literary Supplement. A response by the author to the withdrawn review was published in Politico.

=== Controversy among historians ===
In contrast to its reception in popular media, the book was met with significant criticism from economic historians regarding its methodology, empirical data, and internal logic. Writing in The Journal of Economic History, Alan Olmstead and Paul Rhode argued that Baptist's "torture-led growth" thesis—which attributes a quadrupling of cotton-picking productivity to innovations in violence—ignores substantial evidence that biological innovations, specifically improved cotton seed varieties, were the primary drivers of output gains. They further identified major accounting errors, noting that Baptist's claim that cotton represented nearly half of the U.S. economy in 1836 relied on "double-counting" assets like land and slaves; standard GDP calculations, they noted, place cotton's share at roughly 5 to 6 percent. Other contributors to the same forum, including Jonathan Pritchett and Peter Rousseau, identified implausible statistical claims regarding the New Orleans slave market and critiqued Baptist's interpretations of early U.S. financial history as dated. Furthermore, scholars such as John Clegg and Trevon Logan questioned Baptist's use of slave narratives and his lack of a formal definition of capitalism, with Olmstead and Rhode asserting that Baptist fabricated the term "pushing system" to support his narrative of systematic torture.

The research methods and the approach to writing history used by Baptist and some other historians have faced criticism from economists and economic historians, as discussed in articles referencing this book published in The Chronicle of Higher Education, Catalyst: A Journal of Theory & Strategy, Explorations in Economic History, and The American Interest.
