= Virginia Eubanks =

American political scientist, author

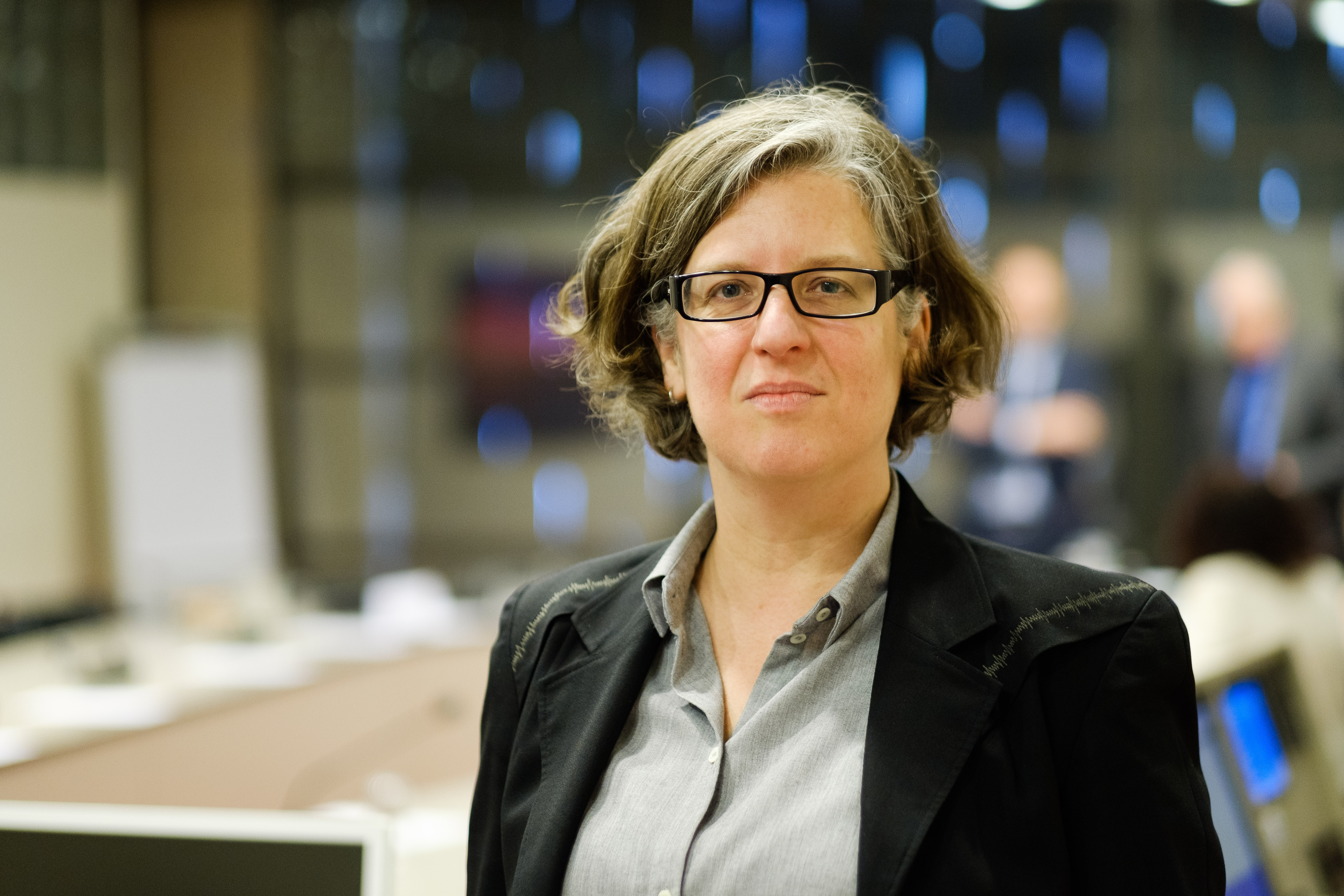
- Known for: Automating Inequality: How High-Tech Tools Profile, Police, and Punish the Poor

Academic background
- Education: University of California, Santa Cruz (B.A.); Rensselaer Polytechnic Institute (M.S., PhD)
- Thesis: Popular technology: Citizenship and inequality in the information economy (2004)

Academic work
- Institutions: University at Albany, SUNY
- Website: https://virginia-eubanks.com/

Virginia Eubanks (born 1972) is an American political scientist, professor, and author studying technology and social justice. She is an associate professor in the Department of Political Science at the University at Albany, SUNY. Previously Eubanks was a Fellow at New America researching digital privacy, economic inequality, and data-based discrimination.

Eubanks has written and co-edited multiple award-winning books, the most well-known being Automating Inequality: How High-Tech Tools Profile, Police, and Punish the Poor. Her book uncovers the harms generated by computer algorithms to replace human decisions and how they negatively impact the economically disadvantaged.

== Education ==
Eubanks graduated with a Bachelor of Arts in Literary Culture in 1994 at the University of California, Santa Cruz. She attended Rensselaer Polytechnic Institute for her graduate studies, where she earned a Masters of Science in Communication and Rhetoric in 1999 and a PhD in Science and Technology Studies in 2004.

== Career and research ==
Eubanks joined the faculty at the University of Albany, SUNY after completing her PhD in 2004. Her research examines the intersection of community technology, poverty, women's citizenship, and social justice.

She was a founding member of the Our Data Bodies Project and a Fellow at New America in 2016–17. Eubanks also co-founded the Popular Technology Workshops, which served as a place for ordinary people to come together to define and combat the social, economic and political injustices of the information age. In 2005, she was a founding member of Our Knowledge, Our Power (OKOP), a welfare rights and economic justice group. OKOP was a member organization of the Poor People's Economic Human Rights Campaign (PPEHRC) until it disbanded in 2015.

Eubanks has written three books: Digital Dead End: Fighting for Social Justice in the Information Age (2011), Automating Inequality: How High-Tech Tools Profile, Police, and Punish the Poor (2018), and A Guide to Open Water Lifesaving: Lessons on Love and Survival, A Memoir (2026). She also co-edited Ain’t Gonna Let Nobody Turn Me Around: Forty Years of Movement Building with Barbara Smith alongside Alethia Jones.

She was featured in the 2020 documentary Coded Bias directed by Shalini Kantayya.

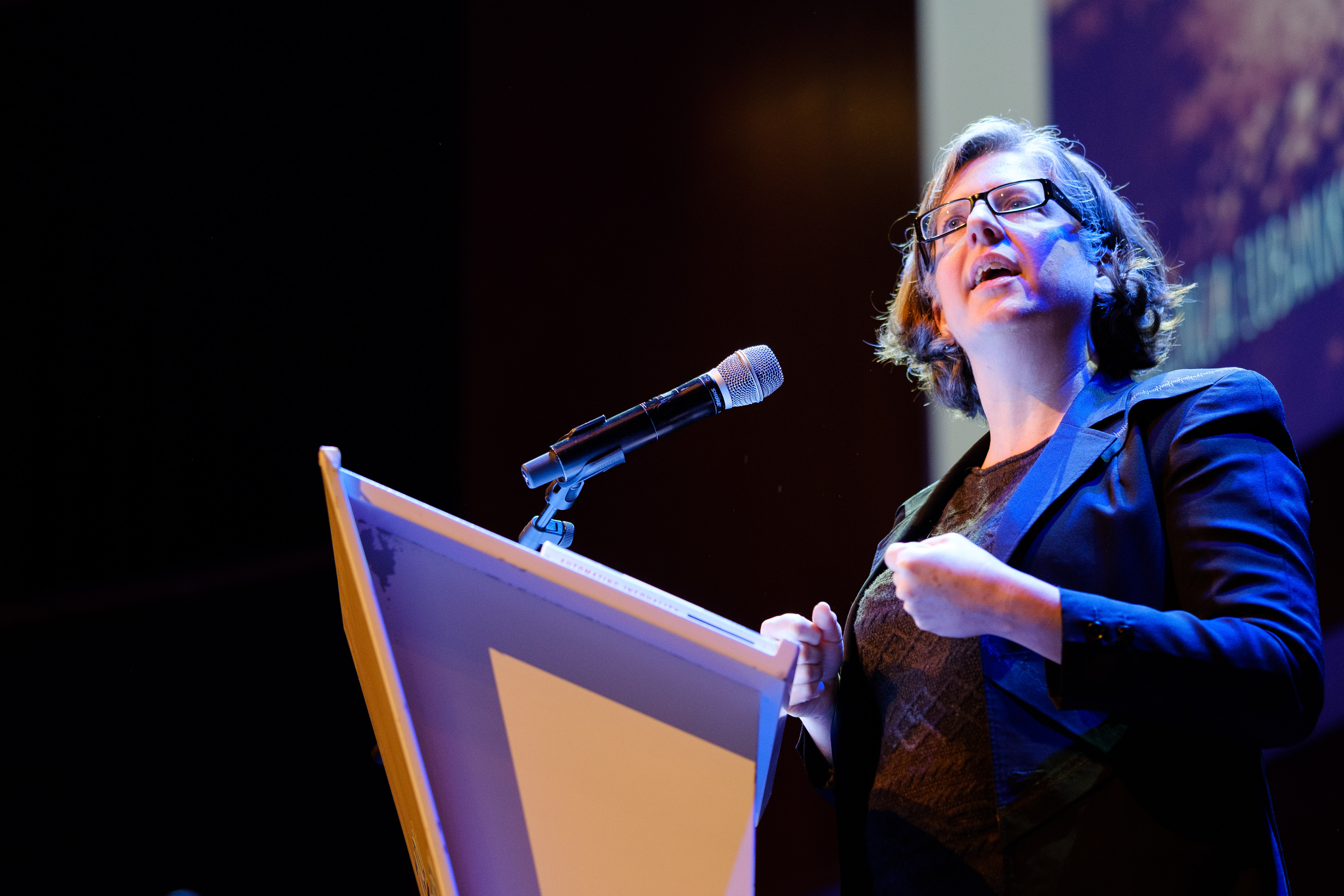

=== Automating Inequality ===
In 2018, Eubanks published the book Automating Inequality: How High-Tech Tools Profile, Police, and Punish the Poor. The New York Times called her book "riveting", which was "an accomplishment for a book on technology and policy".

In her work she investigated the impacts of data mining, policy algorithms, and predictive risk models and their impacts on the poor and working class, especially when automated systems will replace humans in deciding who is worthy of receiving help. Eubanks found that AI-enabled public and private systems linked to health, benefits and policy were making damaging decisions based on flawed data and class, race, and gender biases. She coins the term "digital poorhouse": technological systems that embedded historical or cultural assumptions about what it means to be poor. She used examples of automating welfare eligibility (as implemented by former Indiana Governor Mitch Daniels in 2006), predicting child abuse and neglect, and scoring homeless people to categorize them for limited housing. To solve the issues of automated systems, Eubanks advocated for state intervention and voting policy makers into office who valued social responsibility.

==== Selected awards ====
- Winner of the 2019 Lillian Smith Book Award
- Winner of the 2018 McGannon Center Book Prize
- Shortlisted for the 2018 Goddard Riverside Stephan Russo Book Prize for Social Justice
