= Nancy MacLean =

American professor of history (born 1959)

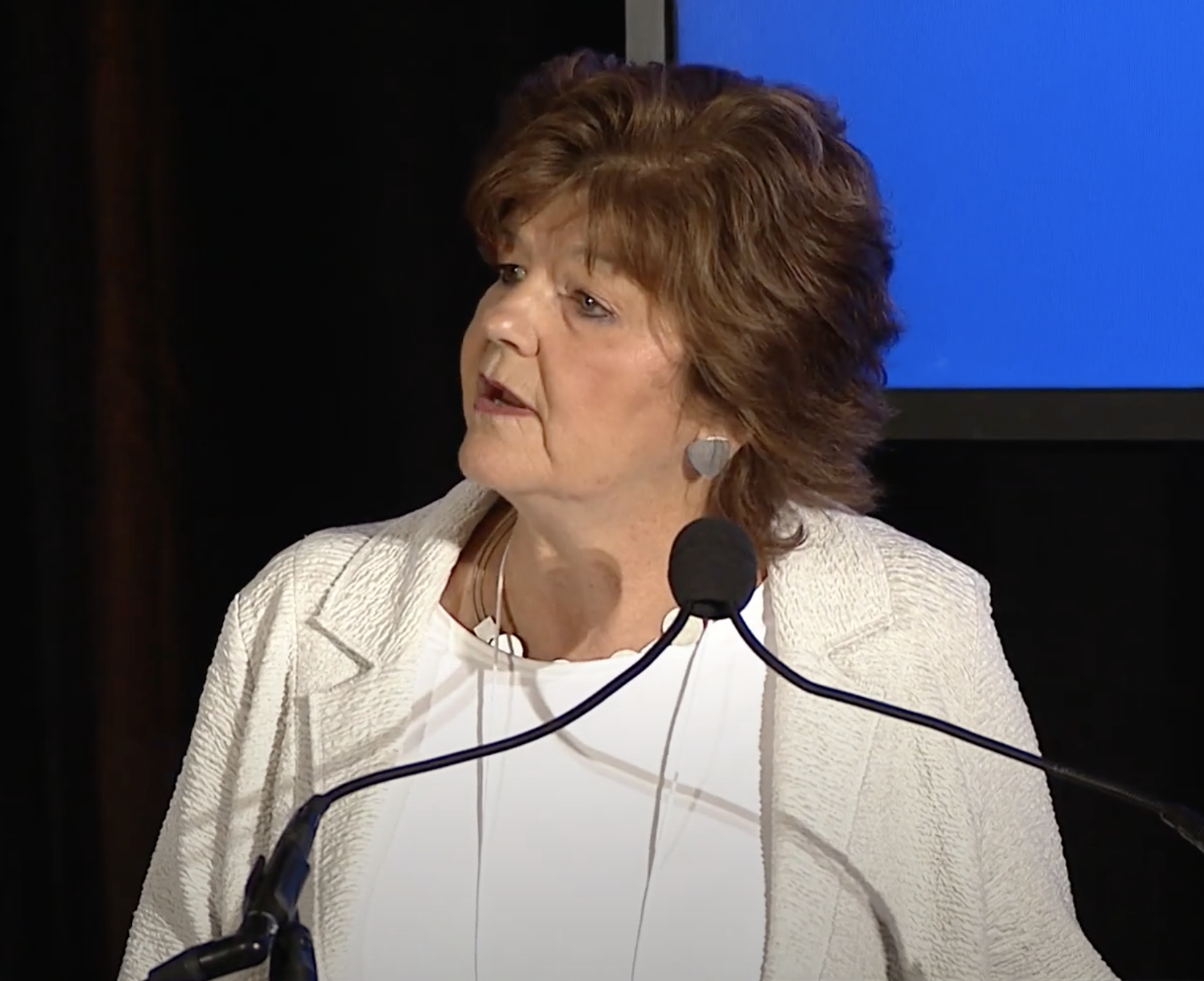
- MacLean speaking in 2019
- Born: Nancy K. MacLean; 1959 (age 66–67); United States

Academic background
- Education: Brown University (BA; MA) UW–Madison (PhD)
- Doctoral advisor: Linda Gordon

Academic work
- Discipline: History of the United States
- Institutions: Duke University; Northwestern University
- Notable works: Democracy in Chains

Nancy K. MacLean (born 1959) is an American historian. She is the William H. Chafe Professor of History and Public Policy at Duke University. MacLean's research focuses on race, gender, labor history and social movements in 20th-century U.S. history, with particular attention to the U.S. South.

== Academic career ==
In 1981, MacLean completed a four-year, combined-degree, B.A./M.A program in history at Brown University, graduating magna cum laude. After graduating, she taught as a lecturer in June 1983 for the International Socialist Organization's three-day "Socialist Summer School" program on the topic of "Women Workers in World War II". In 1989, she received a Ph.D. in history from the University of Wisconsin–Madison, where she studied under Linda Gordon. MacLean's doctoral thesis later became her first book, Behind the Mask of Chivalry: The Making of the Second Ku Klux Klan (1994).

From 1989 to 2010, MacLean taught at Northwestern University, where she chaired the history department and was the Peter B. Ritzma Professor in the Humanities. She spoke in favor of and participated in the Living Wage Campaign.

In 2010, MacLean moved to Duke University. She co-chaired Scholars for a Progressive North Carolina (SPNC), which has since been renamed Scholars for North Carolina's Future (SNCF). In 2013, MacLean participated in SPNC panels and forums held in opposition to the legislative agenda of Republican majority of the North Carolina General Assembly.

== Work ==
=== Behind the Mask of Chivalry (1994) ===
Behind the Mask of Chivalry: The Making of the Second Ku Klux Klan, published in 1994, explores how some five million ordinary, white Protestant men joined the second Ku Klux Klan in the 1920s. MacLean argued that the Ku Klux Klan was an organization "at once mainstream and extreme" that was hostile to both big government and to unionism; that Klan philosophy was anti-elitist and anti-black, but that their patriarchal stance for family values helped achieve a mass following; and that they demonstrated political affinity with the varieties of European fascism of the 1920s.

Behind the Mask of Chivalry received four scholarly awards, and reviewers said it is "a remarkable, readable, and important book", especially for students of the American South, of African American history, and of political violence in the U.S., which is characterized by an "ambitious scope" and "graced by artful, energetic prose." The Organization of American Historians awarded the James A. Rawley Prize to Behind the Mask of Chivalry. William D. Jenkins called MacLean's historical analysis "well-written, yet flawed", because it is "too readily dismissive of the influence of religious and cultural beliefs on human activity." In the Journal of the History of the Behavioral Sciences, J. Morgan Kousser offered a critical review, saying that "MacLean makes elementary errors long identified by sociologists and historians".

=== Freedom Is Not Enough (2006) ===
Freedom Is Not Enough: The Opening of the American Workplace, published in 2006 by Harvard University Press and the Russell Sage Foundation, traces the ways in which civil rights activism produced a seismic shift in U.S. workplaces, from an environment in which discrimination and a "culture of exclusion" were the norm to one that accepted and even celebrated diversity and inclusion.

The book received praise as a "superb and provocative" interpretation of civil rights history, and as an example of "contemporary history at its best." It won seven awards, including the Taft Award for labor history and the Hurst Award for legal history. Kenneth W. Mack praised MacLean for having helped to reintegrate legal frameworks into the discussion of civil rights after it had been neglected by historians.

=== Democracy in Chains (2017) ===
In 2017 MacLean published Democracy in Chains: The Deep History of the Radical Right's Stealth Plan for America. The book focuses on the Nobel Prize-winning political economist James McGill Buchanan and his work developing public choice theory, as well as the roles of Charles Koch and others in nurturing the libertarian movement in the United States. MacLean argues that these figures undertook "a stealth bid to reverse-engineer all of America, at both the state and national levels back to the political economy and oligarchic governance of midcentury Virginia, minus the segregation." According to MacLean, Buchanan represents "the true origin story of today's well-heeled radical right". Some academic critics, mostly libertarians, have disputed the book's argument and have called MacLean's thesis a "conspiracy theory".

== Honors ==
In 1995 MacLean received the Frank L. and Harriet C. Owsley Prize from the Southern Historical Association. In 2010, she was elected a Fellow of the Society of American Historians. In 2007, she received the Philip Taft Labor History Book Award of the Labor and Working Class Studies Association. In 2007 she received the Allan Sharlin Book Award for the best book in social science history from the Social Science History Association. In 2007 she received the Willard Hurst Prize for best book in socio-legal history from the Law and Society Association. In 2007 she received the Labor History Best Book Prize from the International Association of Labor History Institutions. Democracy in Chains was a finalist for the 2017 National Book Award for nonfiction, a finalist for the "Los Angeles Times Book Award in Current Interest", and the winner of the Lannar Foundation Cultural Freedom Award. The book was also named "Most Valuable Book of 2017" by The Nation. In 2018, Democracy in Chains won the Lillian Smith Book Award, for "books that are outstanding creative achievements, worthy of recognition because of their literary merit, moral vision, and honest representation of the South, its people, problems, and promises."

== Books ==
- MacLean, Nancy (1995). Behind the Mask of Chivalry: The Making of the Second Ku Klux Klan. Oxford University Press. ISBN 978-0195098365.
- MacLean, Nancy (2006). Freedom Is Not Enough: The Opening of the American Workplace. Harvard University Press. ISBN 978-0674027497.
- MacLean, Nancy (2008). The American Women's Movement, 1945–2000: A Brief History with Documents. Bedford/St. Martin's. ISBN 978-0312448011.
- Critchlow, Donald T.; MacLean, Nancy (2009). Debating the American Conservative Movement: 1945 to the Present. Rowman & Littlefield. ISBN 978-0742548244.
- Peeples, Edward H.; MacLean, Nancy (2014). Scalawag: A White Southerner's Journey through Segregation to Human Rights Activism. University of Virginia Press. ISBN 978-0813935409.
- MacLean, Nancy (2017). Democracy in Chains: The Deep History of the Radical Right's Stealth Plan for America. Penguin. ISBN 978-1101980989.
