= Democracy in Chains =

2017 book by Nancy MacLean

Democracy in Chains: The Deep History of the Radical Right's Stealth Plan for America
- First edition
- Author: Nancy MacLean
- Language: English
- Genre: Non-fiction
- Publisher: Viking Press
- Publication date: 2017
- Publication place: United States
- Pages: 368
- ISBN: 978-1101980989
- OCLC: 1033429279

Democracy in Chains: The Deep History of the Radical Right's Stealth Plan for America is a 2017 nonfiction book by Nancy MacLean published by Viking Press. MacLean critically examines the school of economic thinking known as "public choice", focusing on its founder James M. Buchanan, who received the Nobel Memorial Prize in Economics in 1986. According to MacLean, Buchanan's work has had a significant influence on the libertarian movement and in the US Republican Party, including the political activities of the Koch brothers.

MacLean argues that Buchanan believed democracy must be suppressed for capitalism to flourish, which explains why the right wing, funded behind the scenes by secretive dark money networks, engages in anti-democratic behavior and policy-making, such as opposing unions and Social Security, supporting voter suppression and privatization, and placing impenetrable barriers to popular and social democracy. The book was a finalist for the National Book Award for Nonfiction. Reviewers received it mostly along partisan political lines.

== Background and development ==
The idea for the book came about while MacLean was researching school segregation in Prince Edward County, Virginia. She was studying the closure of public schools by segregationists from 1959 to 1964 in reaction to the 1954 U.S. Supreme Court landmark decision Brown v. Board of Education, which held that laws establishing racial segregation in public schools were unconstitutional.

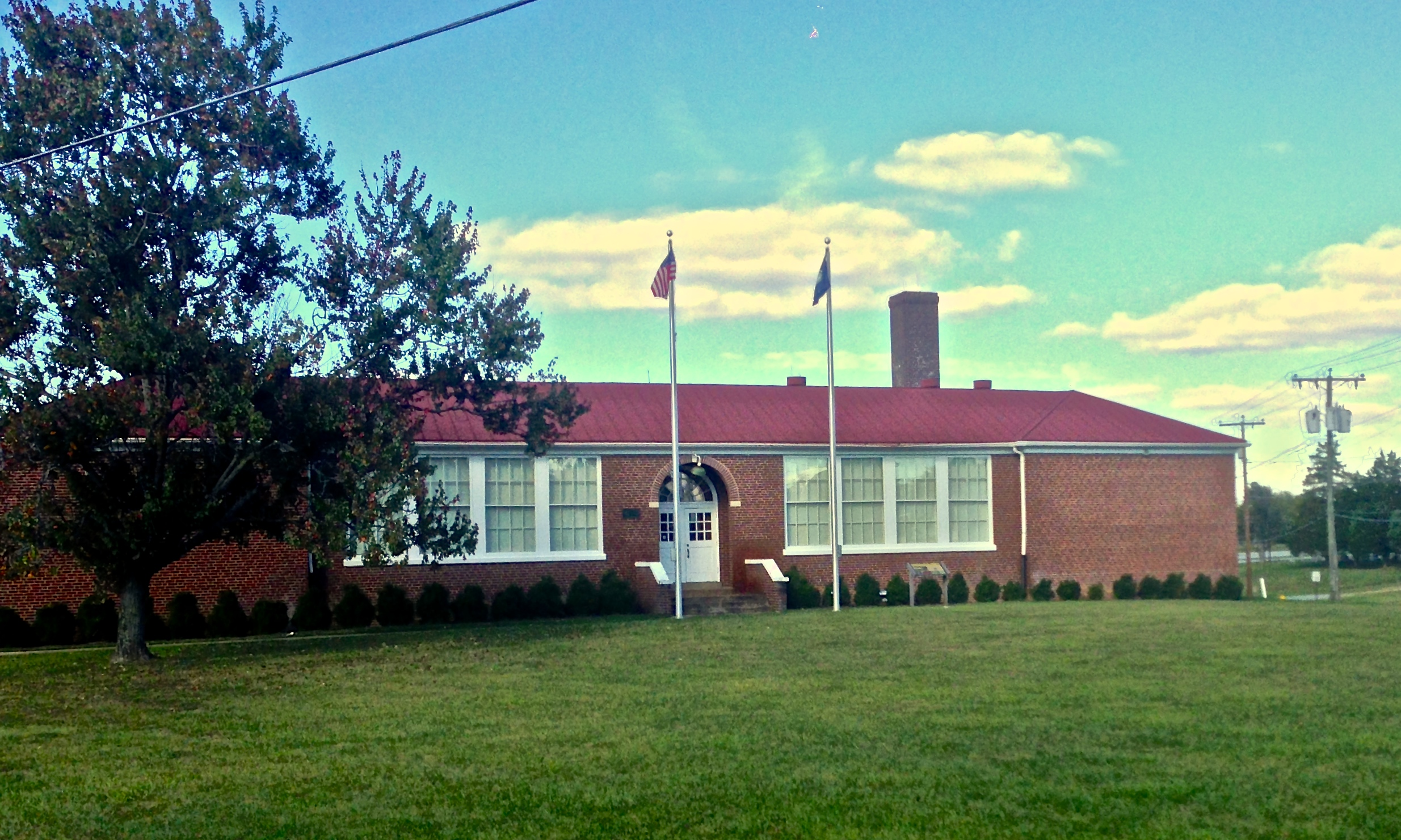
The former Robert Russa Moton High School in Farmville, Prince Edward County, Virginia. It is considered "the student birthplace of America's Civil Rights Movement".

MacLean learned that Prince Edward County refused to appropriate funds for the County School Board, effectively closing all public schools rather than integrate them, in a strategy known as massive resistance, an attempt to get Virginia's white politicians to pass laws and policies to prevent public school desegregation. "Black students were locked out of any formal education while their white peers went off to private, segregation academies with school vouchers, essentially punishing the black community in Prince Edward for having been part of the Brown v. Board of Education case," she recalled.

Her research, which spanned a period of about ten years, led her to American economist Milton Friedman and his defense of school vouchers, and to American economist James M. Buchanan. After Buchanan died in 2013, MacLean gained access to his papers at the Buchanan House at George Mason University. She discovered documents supporting the Kochs' investment in Buchanan's Center for Study of Public Choice, and this led her to develop her hypothesis about right-wing politics in the U.S. for the book.

== Content summary ==
This book focuses on the Nobel Memorial Prize in Economic Sciences-winning political economist James M. Buchanan and his work developing public choice theory, as well as the roles of Charles Koch and others, in nurturing the libertarian movement in the United States. MacLean argues that these figures undertook "a stealth bid to reverse-engineer all of America, at both the state and national levels back to the political economy and oligarchic governance of midcentury Virginia, minus the segregation." According to MacLean, Buchanan represents "the true origin story of today’s well-heeled radical right."

== Reception ==
The book was praised by liberal and progressive scholars and readers. In The Atlantic, Sam Tanenhaus called Democracy in Chains "A vibrant intellectual history of the radical right", writing that the book "is part of a new wave of historiography that has been examining the southern roots of modern conservatism" and that it "untangle[s] important threads in American history [...] to make us see how much of that history begins, and still lives, in the South." George Monbiot, climate science author and columnist for The Guardian, wrote that the book was "the missing chapter: a key to understanding the politics of the past half century." Colin Gordon, writing in Jacobin, called the book "a revelation, as politics and as history." MacLean was interviewed by Rebecca Onion in Slate, Alex Shephard in The New Republic, and Mark Karl in Alternet about her "remarkable" and "groundbreaking" book. Bethany Moreton of Dartmouth College called the book "indispensable reading [that] adds a critical storyline to the complex and multi-causal conservative counterrevolution." For BillMoyers.com, Kristin Miller wrote that MacLean "has unearthed a stealth ideologue of the American right" whom Charles Koch "looked to for inspiration". For NPR, Genevieve Valentie wrote the book "feels like it was written with a clock ticking down" after a "sixty-year campaign to make libertarianism mainstream and eventually take the government itself." Marshall Steinbaum of the Roosevelt Institute described himself as "in sympathy with MacLean’s characterization of the Virginia School as profoundly antidemocratic and anti-academic" and called the book "an important warning, and it should be read by all despite its rhetorical shortcomings." Luke Darby of GQ called Democracy in Chains "one of the nine books to read before the next election." MacLean was an invited guest on several popular television and radio outlets, most notably Real Time with Bill Maher, where she appeared twice (in August and November 2018) to discuss contemporary politics and the history of the far right.

Democracy in Chains was also criticized by libertarian scholars and readers in a special Volokh Conspiracy series that ran through June and July 2017. David Bernstein disputed her portrayal of Buchanan and George Mason University, where Bernstein is and Buchanan was a professor, and questioned the accuracy of her depiction of Buchanan's influence on the libertarian movement. Jonathan H. Adler noted allegations of serious errors and misleading quotations in Democracy in Chains raised by Russ Roberts, David R. Henderson, Don Boudreaux and others. Adler, Ilya Somin and Georg Vanberg were all part of the Volokh Conspiracy series. Michael Munger, a libertarian political scientist at Duke University wrote that Democracy in Chains "is a work of speculative historical fiction". Phil Magness argued that MacLean had "simply made up an inflammatory association" about Buchanan and the Southern Agrarians. Steve Horwitz argued that it was "a book that gets almost everything wrong, from the most basic of facts to the highest of theory". Brian Doherty argued, contra MacLean, that Buchanan had upbraided his colleagues who supported the Chilean dictatorship. Other critics such as David Bernstein of the libertarian Reason (magazine) pointed out MacLean's socialist political views and previous work for the International Socialist Organization. In response, MacLean said she was the target of a "coordinated and interlinked set of calculated hit jobs" by "the Koch team of professors who don't disclose their conflicts of interest and the operatives who work full time for their project to shackle our democracy". She said her book's ranking on Amazon was being spammed by negative reviews and rankings and urged people to post positive ones in response (this is against Amazon policy). Adler, Bernstein, Carden, and Magness responded to her, saying that any Koch relationship was already acknowledged. Vanberg noted two later private letters in which Buchanan discussed his work on school vouchers and condemned the "evils of race-class-cultural segregation."

Others who fell into neither "team Public Choice" or "team anti-Buchanan" offered mixed reviews. Henry Farrell and Steven Teles called the book a "conspiracy theory in the guise of intellectual history" and wrote, "while we do not share Buchanan's ideology ... we think the broad thrust of the criticism is right. MacLean is not only wrong in detail but mistaken in the fundamentals of her account." Similarly, Noah Smith agreed that MacLean had taken Tyler Cowen, whom he called "a staunch defender of democracy", out of context. Heather Boushey wrote that MacLean had shone "a light on important truths" but cautioned that "her overt moral revulsion at her subject can sometimes make it seem as if we're getting only part of the picture". Jack Rakove wrote that there "should be a thorough scholarly review of these points [raised by critics], and one suspects that MacLean will have to make a more concerted effort to justify her argument than she has yet provided". He concluded that "her questions remain important and well worth pondering". Katherine Timpf of the National Review criticized MacLean for remarks she made during a February 7, 2018, talk in New York City. MacLean was asked to explain Buchanan's motivations. She replied, "As an author, I have struggled with this, and I could explain it in different ways. I didn’t put this in the book, but I will say it here. It’s striking to me how many of the architects of this cause seem to be on the autism spectrum —you know, people who don’t feel solidarity or empathy with others, and who have difficult human relationships sometimes." In 2022, George Leef, writing in the National Review, called it "a screed" and "a brazenly dishonest book".

In her review for the academic journal History of Political Economy, Jennifer Burns wrote that "the narrative of American history [that Democracy in Chains] presents is insular and highly politicized, laying out a drama of good versus evil with little attention paid to the larger worlds—global, economic, or intellectual—in which the story nests." In a review for the academic journal International Social Science Review, Ben Sorensen wrote, "the leftist bias and the assertions of conspiracy render the book questionably credible, at best".

== Accolades ==
Democracy in Chains was a finalist for the 2017 National Book Award for nonfiction, a finalist for the "Los Angeles Times Book Award in Current Interest", and the winner of the Lannar Foundation Cultural Freedom Award. The book was also named "Most Valuable Book of 2017" by The Nation. In 2018, Democracy in Chains won the Lillian Smith Book Award, for "books that are outstanding creative achievements, worthy of recognition because of their literary merit, moral vision, and honest representation of the South, its people, problems, and promises."
