= Paul Morton Gaston =

American historian

Paul M. Gaston
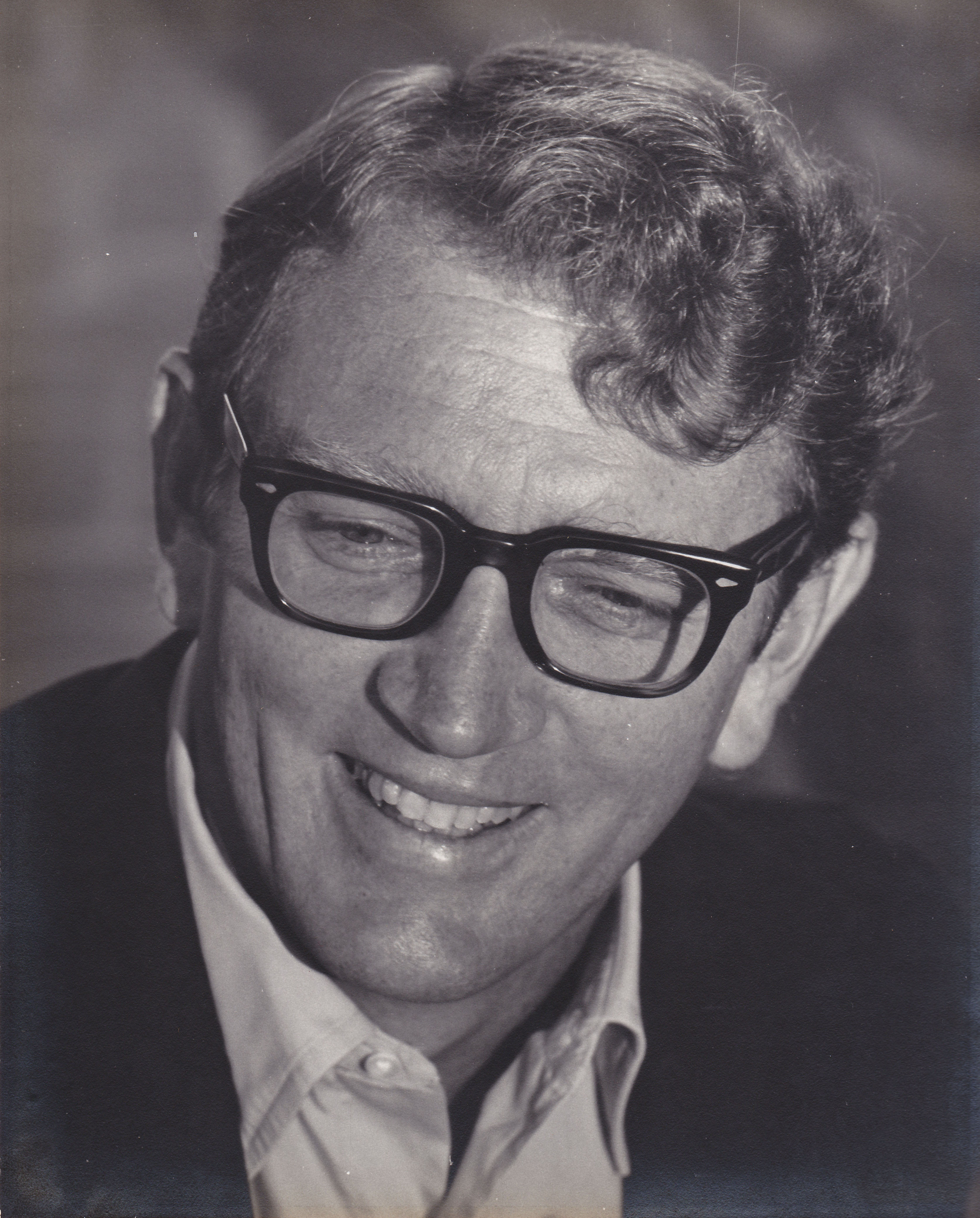
- Born: Paul Morton Gaston; January 31, 1928; Fairhope, Alabama, U.S.
- Died: June 14, 2019 (aged 91); Charlottesville, Virginia, U.S.
- Awards: Lillian Smith Book Award (1970) Arabella Carter Community Service Award (2002) SCHEV Outstanding Faculty Award (1994) Charlottesville Bridge Builder (2005)

Academic background
- Education: Southwestern at Memphis; Swarthmore College (BA); University of North Carolina, Chapel Hill (MA PhD)
- Doctoral advisor: Fletcher Melvin Green

Academic work
- Institutions: University of Virginia

Paul Morton Gaston (January 31, 1928 – June 14, 2019) was an American historian, civil rights activist, and writer, who focused on the US Civil Rights Movement and the post Civil War American South and taught for forty years at the University of Virginia.

== Early life and education ==
Paul M. Gaston was born and raised in Fairhope, Alabama, a Georgist "Single Tax" community founded in 1894 by his grandfather E. B. Gaston. From the age of two he attended the Marietta Johnson School of Organic Education, graduating high school in 1946. After high school he enlisted in the US Army and served eighteen months in South Korea.

In the fall of 1948 he enrolled at Southwestern at Memphis College (now Rhodes College), transferring to Swarthmore College after one year. He graduated from Swarthmore in 1952 with high honors, receiving a BA in history. After graduating Swarthmore he was awarded a Fulbright to study in Copenhagen, Denmark, where he wrote about Georgism and land value taxation in Denmark.

He returned to the U.S. in 1953 for doctoral studies at the University of North Carolina at Chapel Hill where he studied under Fletcher Melvin Green and wrote a dissertation on the New South movement.

== Career ==
Gaston was hired by the University of Virginia's Corcoran Department of History in 1957 where he taught until his retirement in 1997. In addition to his scholarly activities, he was instrumental in the forming of the Carter G. Woodson Institute of African-American and African Studies and bringing civil rights leader Julian Bond to join the faculty.

Early in his time at UVA he served as faculty adviser to a liberal, interracial student group, the Virginia Council on Human Relations, and helped bring the Rev. Martin Luther King Jr. to speak at the University in 1963.

Also in 1963, he participated in protests to integrate a local movie theater and restaurant and was beaten and arrested in the process.

Gaston's most influential book, The New South Creed, was published by Alfred A. Knopf in 1970 and argued that the mythology of the New South developed after the Civil War helped cover up and perpetuate a racist and conservative society. It won the Lillian Smith Book Award in 1970 and historian George M. Fredrickson reviewed the book favorably in 1971. It has been in print continuously since 1970 and was reissued in a new edition by NewSouth Books in 2002.

== Death and legacy ==
Paul M. Gaston died in Charlottesville, Virginia on June 14, 2019 at the age of 91.

On August 30, 2024, the University of Virginia dedicated a new student dormitory (the "Gaston House") in his honor. The dedication event was held shortly after police had forcibly cleared from the Grounds students who were protesting the mass death and destruction cased by the Gaza war. One of Gaston's sons spoke at the dedication event and criticized the University for its hypocrisy in honoring Gaston for his history of non-violent protest while simultaneously calling the police to end a protest they disagreed with.

== Works ==
=== Books ===
- The New South Creed: A Study in Southern Mythmaking (1970)
- Women of Fair Hope (1984)
- Man and Mission: E. B. Gaston and the Origins of the Fairhope Single Tax Colony (1993)
- Coming of Age in Utopia: The Odyssey of an Idea (2009)

=== Book Chapters ===
- "The 'New South' ", Writing Southern History: Essays in Historiography in Honor of Fletcher M. Green (1965)
- C. Vann Woodward: A Southern Historian and His Critics (1997)
- "Forward by Way of Memoir", The Moderates Dilemma: Massive Resistance to School Desegregation in Virginia (1998)
- "My Yellow Ribbon Town: A Meditation on my Country and my Home", Where We Stand: Voices of Southern Dissent (2004)
- "The Double Death of Martin Luther King, Jr.", Dixie Redux: Essays in Honor of Sheldon Hackney (2013)

=== Articles ===
- "Speaking for the Negro", Virginia Quarterly Review, 1965
- "The South and the Quest for Equality", New South, 1972
- "C. Vann Woodward, Southern Historian", Virginia Quarterly Review, 1983
- "Irony in Utopia: The Discovery of Nancy Lewis", Virginia Quarterly Review, 1984
- "A Southerner in South Africa", Southern Changes, 1986
- "Man and Mission: E. B. Gaston and the Fairhope Single Tax Colony", Alabama Heritage, 1996
