= Locking Up Our Own =

2017 book

- Author: James Forman Jr.
- Subjects: Incarceration in the United States; African-American studies
- Publisher: Farrar, Straus and Giroux
- Publication date: April 2017
- Pages: 320
- Awards: Pulitzer Prize for General Nonfiction; Lillian Smith Book Award
- ISBN: 9780374189976
- OCLC: 1242331020
- Dewey Decimal: 364.97308996073
- LC Class: HV9950
- Website: Official website

Locking Up Our Own: Crime and Punishment in Black America is a 2017 book by James Forman Jr. on support for the 1970s war on crime from Black leaders in American cities. It won the 2018 Pulitzer Prize for General Nonfiction and the Lillian Smith Book Award. The book was also longlisted for the 2017 National Book Award for Nonfiction.
