= Roy Hoffman =

American writer and journalist

- Born: June 23, 1953 (age 73); Mobile, Alabama, U.S.
- Education: Tulane University
- Occupations: Writer, journalist
- Known for: Lillian Smith Book Award-winning novel Almost Family

Roy Hoffman (born June 23, 1953) is an American writer and journalist. He has published several books including his Lillian Smith Book Award-winning novel Almost Family. He has written articles for the New York Times and the Mobile Press-Register. He has also received awards for his literary work.

== Personal life ==
Hoffman was born and raised in a Jewish family in Mobile, Alabama, United States. After receiving his baccalaureate degree in English in 1975, he moved to New York. He has lived Manhattan and Brooklyn for twenty years. He and his family live in Fairhope.

== Career ==
Hoffman began his writing career from younger age. He contributed to his high school literary magazine. During the study at Tulane University, he also wrote for the college newspaper. He has worked for New York Magazine and WNET-13 public television station. He has also worked for then-Governor Mario M. Cuomo. He has also written articles and book reviews. He has published his first book Almost Family in 1983. His second book was a novel. He has also published a collection of essays.

== Awards ==
- Lillian Smith Book Award, Southern Regional Council, 1983
- Alabama Author Award, Alabama Library Association, 1984

== Bibliography ==
- Almost Family New York: Dial Press, 1983. Rpt. Tuscaloosa: University of Alabama Press, 2000.
- Back Home: Journeys Through Mobile Tuscaloosa: University of Alabama Press, 2001.
- Chicken Dreaming Corn A Novel.Athens: University of Georgia Press, 2004.
- Hoffman, Roy (March 15, 2022). The Promise of the Pelican: A Novel. Arcade Crimewise. ISBN 978-1950994342.
