= Charles W. Eagles =

American historian (born 1946)

- Born: September 22, 1946 (age 79); Spartanburg, South Carolina, U.S.
- Education: University of North Carolina at Chapel Hill
- Occupation: Historian
- Employer: University of Mississippi
- Title: William F. Winter Professor of History Emeritus

Charles W. Eagles (born September 22, 1946) is an American historian. He is the William F. Winter Professor of History Emeritus at the University of Mississippi and the author of several books about the civil rights movement.

== Selected bibliography ==
- Eagles, Charles W. (2017). Civil Rights, Culture Wars: The Fight over a Mississippi Textbook. University of North Carolina Press.
- Eagles, Charles W. (2009). The Price of Defiance: James Meredith and the Integration of Ole Miss. University of North Carolina Press. Winner of the 2010 Lillian Smith Book Award.
- Eagles, Charles W. (1993). Outside Agitator: Jon Daniels and the Civil Rights Movement in Alabama. University of North Carolina Press. Winner of the 1993 Lillian Smith Book Award.
- Eagles, Charles W. (1990). Democracy Delayed: Congressional Reapportionment and Urban-Rural Conflict in the 1920s. University of Georgia Press.
- Eagles, Charles W. (1982). Jonathan Daniels and Race Relations: The Evolution of a Southern Liberal. University of Tennessee Press.
