= Minion K. C. Morrison =

American political scientist

- Born: 1946 (age 79–80)
- Education: Tougaloo College; University of Wisconsin–Madison; University of Ghana
- Awards: Frank Johnson Goodnow Award, APSA; Lillian Smith Book Award; Aaron Henry Lifetime Achievement Award, NAACP
- Scientific career
- Fields: Political science
- Workplaces: Hobart and William Smith Colleges; Syracuse University; University of Missouri; Mississippi State University; University of Delaware

Minion Kenneth Chauncey Morrison (born 1946) is an American political scientist. He is a professor in the School of Public Policy and Administration at the University of Delaware. Morrison studies comparative politics and American politics, and has published books and articles on the Civil Rights Movement and its effects on the next several decades of American politics, including a biography of Mississippi NAACP leader Aaron Henry. He also specializes in the politics of Ghana.

== Education and early work ==
Morrison attended Tougaloo College, earning a BA in 1968. He then studied at The University of Wisconsin–Madison, graduating with an MA in 1969 and a PhD in 1977. During this time he also studied at the University of Ghana, earning a certificate in African studies in 1974.

Between 1969 and 1977, Morrison spent several terms as an instructor at Tougaloo College. Upon receiving his PhD in 1977, he joined the faculty at Hobart and William Smith Colleges, moving in 1978 to Syracuse University. In 1989 he moved to The University of Missouri, where he was Vice Provost of Minority Affairs and Faculty Developments until 1997, and from 2005 until 2008 held the Frederick Middlebush Chair. In 2009 he became a professor at Mississippi State University, where he was also Head of the Department of Political Science and Public Administration, and affiliated with African American Studies. In 2016 he moved to the University of Delaware.

== Career ==
In addition to articles in academic journals, Morrison has published several books. In 1982 he published Ethnicity and Political Integration: The Case of Ashanti, Ghana, which arose from his 1977 PhD dissertation. The book investigates the development in the early 1970s of regionalism and political integration in Ghana using four locations in Ghana's Ashanti Region.

Morrison published a second book in 1989, called Black Political Mobilization, Leadership and Power. Morrison examines the effects of the Civil Rights Movement on the American political landscape of the 1980s, and particularly how mobilization of African-Americans that began in the Civil Rights Movement continued to influence political events through the following few decades. The book studies this question using the cases of Bolton, Mississippi, Mayersville, Mississippi, and Tchula, Mississippi, three towns which had elected black mayors after being controlled entirely by white politicians since the Reconstruction era.

In 2015, Morrison published a third, book, Aaron Henry of Mississippi: Inside Agitator. The book is the first full biography of Aaron Henry, who was the president of the Mississippi section of the National Association for the Advancement of Colored People (NAACP), and a leader of the Freedom Summer. The book focuses not just on Henry's role as an activists during the Civil Rights Movement, but also on his time as a more obscure activist and as an elected official, arguing that these experiences made Henry a usually effective activist during the Civil Rights Movement. For this book, Morrison was awarded the Lillian Smith Book Award in 2016. Morrison spoke about Aaron Henry of Mississippi in a forum on C-SPAN.

In addition to authoring these books, Morrison was also the co-editor of the books Race and Democracy in the Americas: Brazil and the United States (2003) with David Covin and Michael Mitchell, and Housing and Urban Poor in Africa (1982) with Peter Gutkind.

Together with Mary Fainsod Katzenstein, Morrison won the 2015 Frank Johnson Goodnow Award from the American Political Science Association, a lifetime award that "honors service to the community of teachers, researchers, and public servants who work in the many fields of politics." Morrison also won the Aaron Henry Lifetime Achievement Award from the Mississippi section of the NAACP.

== Selected works ==
- Ethnicity and Political Integration: The Case of Ashanti, Ghana (1982)
- Black Political Mobilization, Leadership and Power (1989)
- Aaron Henry of Mississippi: Inside Agitator (2015)

== Selected awards ==
- Frank Johnson Goodnow Award, American Political Science Association (2015)
- Lillian Smith Book Award (2016)
- Aaron Henry Lifetime Achievement Award, Mississippi NAACP (2016)
