= Adam Fairclough (historian) =

British historian of the United States

- Born: 1952 (age 73–74)
- Occupation: Historian

Adam Fairclough (born 1952) is a British historian of the United States. He is the Raymond and Beverly Sackler Professor of American History at the University of Leiden in the Netherlands. Between 2008 and 2014, he served as the chair of the Netherlands American Studies Association. He has written on a number of subjects, and specializes in the Civil Rights Movement and the period of Reconstruction. His best known work is To Redeem the Soul of America: The Southern Christian Leadership Conference and Martin Luther King, Jr. Fairclough is a qualified expert in the field of American History, but specializes in the Civil Rights Movement.

== Partial bibliography ==
- To Redeem the Soul of America: The Southern Christian Leadership Conference and Martin Luther King, Jr., University of Georgia Press (1987)
- Race & Democracy: The Civil Rights Struggle in Louisiana, 1915-1972, University of Georgia Press (Lillian Smith Book Award winner, 1995)
- Better Day Coming: Blacks and Equality, 1890-2000, Viking Press (2001)
- Teaching Equality: Black Schools in the Age of Jim Crow, University of Georgia Press (2001)
- A Class of Their Own: Black Teachers in the Segregated South, Belknap Press of Harvard University Press (2006)
- The Revolution That Failed : Reconstruction in Natchitoches, University of Florida Press (2018)
