= C. Eric Lincoln =

American novelist

Charles Eric Lincoln (June 23, 1924 – May 14, 2000) was an American scholar. He was the author of several books, including sociological works such as The Black Church Since Frazier (1974) and Race, Religion and the Continuing American Dilemma (1984), as well as fiction and poetry.

== Biography ==
C. Eric Lincoln was born in Athens, Alabama, on June 23, 1924. He was abandoned by his father, then by his mother, and raised by his grandmother. He attended Trinity School in Athens, where he edited the school newspaper, the Campus Chronicle. At the age of 13, he picked cotton to support his family and to buy books for his studies. He graduated a valedictorian from high school. After studying and working in Chicago, he served in the U.S. Navy from 1943 to 1945. He received a BA in sociology and philosophy from LeMoyne-Owen College in Memphis, Tennessee, in 1947. In 1954, he received an MA from Fisk University in Nashville, Tennessee. In 1956, he received a Bachelor of Divinity from the University of Chicago, and in 1957 he was ordained as a Methodist minister. He went on to earn a master's degree in education, and in 1960 he received a PhD in Social Ethics from Boston University.

He started his career as a sales representative for Pepsi Cola, then was a manager for a Memphis nightclub, and a road manager for the Birmingham Black Barons baseball team. As an academic, he taught at Clark Atlanta University in Atlanta, Georgia, for eleven years, from 1962 to 1972. He served as Adjunct or visiting professor at Portland State University in Oregon, Union Theological Seminary in the City of New York, Fordham University, Brown University, and at the University of Ghana. In 1970, he became the founding president of the Black Academy of Letters. From 1973 to 1976, he served as Professor of Religion and of Sociology and chairman of the Department of Religion and Philosophical Studies at Fisk University. From 1976 to 1993, he taught Religion and Culture at Duke University in Durham, North Carolina.

His novel, The Avenue, Clayton City, won the Lillian Smith Book Award for Best Southern Fiction in 1988 and the International Black Writers' Alice Browning Award in 1989. In 1990 he was elected to the Fellowship of Southern Writers. He was friends with Martin Luther King Jr., Malcolm X, and Alex Haley. In 1990, he was cited by Pope John Paul II for "scholarly service to the church".

He was diagnosed with diabetes in 1980 and died on May 14, 2000, at the age of 75 in Durham, North Carolina.

== Bibliography ==
- The Black Muslims in America (1961)
- My Face Is Black (1964)
- The Negro Pilgrimage in America (1967)
- Race, Religion and the Continuing American Dilemma (1984)
- The Avenue, Clayton City (1988)
- The Black Church in the African-American Experience (with Lawrence H. Mamiya, 1990)
- This Road Since Freedom: Collected Poems (1990)
- Coming Through the Fire: Surviving Race and Place in America (1996)
