= Automating Inequality =

Book by Virginia Eubanks

- Author: Virginia Eubanks
- Subject: technology and poverty
- Published: 2018
- Publisher: St. Martin's Press
- Awards: Stephan Russo Book Prize (shortlist)
- ISBN: 978-1-250-07431-7

Automating Inequality: How High-Tech Tools Profile, Police, and Punish the Poor is a book by Virginia Eubanks.

== Background ==
The book focuses on how automation negatively impacts the poor. In the United States during the 19th century, poor people were often sent to poorhouses. Eubanks draws a connection from the poorhouses of the 19th century to how we control and contain poor people using technology in the 21st century. Eubanks is an associate professor of political science at State University of New York.

The book discusses how housing in Los Angeles has been automated. The book discusses Mitch Daniels's attempt to privatize and automate welfare in Indiana. The attempt led to a 54% increase in the denial of benefits from the previous three years. In Pittsburgh, there was an attempt to use predictive risk modeling to identify at-risk children. Many automated processes are intended to maximize profit. The last chapter goes over ways that these oppressive systems can be dismantled.

== Reception ==
LibraryJournal praised the book for covering academic material in a way that is easy to read. The book was shortlisted for the Stephan Russo Book Prize. The Financial Times compared and contasted the book with Algorithms of Oppression.
