= New South =

American slogan

New South, New South Democracy or New South Creed is a slogan in the history of the Southern United States, first used during the Reconstruction era after the American Civil War. Reformers of that period used the term to call for a modernization of Southern society and attitudes, an integration more fully with the United States as a whole, and a rejection of the economy and traditions of the Old South and the slavery-based plantation system of the prewar period while still maintaining white supremacy through Jim Crow laws and political disenfranchisement. The term was coined by its leading proponent, The Atlanta Constitution editor Henry W. Grady, in 1874.

In the mid-20th century, the meaning of the term evolved as the Civil Rights Movement challenged segregation and white dominance. The dismantling of Jim Crow laws, economic diversification, and increasing urbanization led to a more racially inclusive and economically competitive South. This period concurrently saw the emergence of African American political power, the growth of cities like Atlanta, Charlotte, Nashville, and Houston, and the rise of industries beyond agriculture.

== Etymology and philosophy ==
The original use of the term "New South" was an attempt to prescribe an attractive future based on a growing economy. The industrial revolution of the Northern U.S. was the model. The prewar South was heavily agrarian. Following the American Civil War, the South was impoverished and heavily rural; it was mainly reliant on cotton and a few other crops with low market prices. Economically, it was in great need of industrialization. With slavery abolished, African Americans were playing a different role in the New South. Henry W. Grady made this term popular in his articles and speeches as editor of the Atlanta Constitution. Richard Hathaway Edmonds of the Baltimore Manufacturers' Record was another staunch advocate of New South industrialization. The Manufacturers' Record was one of the most widely read and powerful publications among turn of the 20th-century industrialists. Historian Paul Gaston coined the specific term "New South Creed" to describe the promises of visionaries like Grady, who said industrialization would bring prosperity to the region.

The classic history was written by C. Vann Woodward: The Origins of the New South: 1877–1913, published in 1951 by Louisiana State University Press. Sheldon Hackney, a Woodward student, hails the book but explains:

Of one thing we may be certain at the outset. The durability of Origins of the New South is not a result of its ennobling and uplifting message. It is the story of the decay and decline of the aristocracy, the suffering and betrayal of the poor whites, and the rise and transformation of the middle class. It is not a happy story. The Redeemer is revealed to be as venal as the carpetbagger. The declining aristocracy are ineffectual and money hungry, and in the last analysis, they subordinated the values of their political and social heritage in order to maintain control over the black population. The poor whites suffered from strange malignancies of racism and conspiracy-mindedness, and the rising middle class was timid and self-interested even in its reform movement. The most sympathetic characters in the whole sordid affair are simply those who are too powerless to be blamed for their actions.

The New South campaign was championed by Southern elites often outside of the old planter class. Their hopes were to make a fresh "new" start, forming partnerships with Northern capitalists in order to modernize and speed up economic development of the South. From Henry Grady to Black leader Booker T. Washington, New South advocates wanted southern economic regeneration, sectional reconciliation, racial harmony, and believed in the gospel of work.

The rise of the New South, however, involved the continued supremacy of whites over blacks, who had little or no political power once Reconstruction was over. Federal troops were withdrawn from the South as a result of the Compromise of 1877, and Jim Crow laws were put in place to suppress black rights. For example, Grady stated in an 1888 speech about the New South, "The supremacy of the white race of the South must be maintained forever, and the domination of the negro race resisted at all points and at all hazards because the white race is the superior race ... [This declaration] shall run forever with the blood that feeds Anglo-Saxon hearts."

== History ==
=== Great Depression and World War II ===
The economic woes of the Great Depression dampened much New South enthusiasm, as investment capital dried up and the rest of the nation began to view the South as an economic failure. World War II would usher in a degree of economic prosperity as efforts to industrialize in support of the War effort were employed. In the southern mountains, the Tennessee Valley Authority built dams, which generated employment and electricity that affected numerous residents and manufacturers alike. Other Southern industries, such as mining, steel and ship building, flourished during World War II, and set the stage for increased industrialization, urban development, and economic prosperity in Southern ports and cities in the second half of the 20th century.

In the post-World War II era, American textiles makers and other light industries moved en masse to the South to capitalize on low wages, social conservatism, and anti-union sentiments. With the industrialization of the South came economic change, migration, immigration and population growth. Light industries would move offshore, but has been replaced to a degree by auto manufacturing, tourism, and energy production, among others.

=== Civil Rights era ===
The beginnings of the Civil Rights era in the 1950s and 1960s, led to a revival of the term to describe a South that would no longer be held back by Jim Crow Laws and other aspects of compulsory legal segregation. Racist conflicts during the Civil Rights Movement gave the American South a backward image in popular culture. Again, the initial slow pace of civil rights reforms, notably in the areas of school desegregation and voting rights, at first made the "New South" more of a slogan than a description of the South as it actually was. The Civil Rights Act of 1964 and the Voting Rights Act of 1965 would bring an era of far more rapid change. During the 1960s, the black population finally began being enfranchised and represented in political offices.

=== Political uses ===
For over 100 years, from before the Civil War until the mid-1960s, the Democratic Party exercised a virtual monopoly on Southern politics, which came to be known as the Solid South. Thus elections were actually decided between Democratic factions in primary elections, often all white. The Democratic nomination was considered to be tantamount to election.

The "New South" period is double-edged. After the passage of civil rights legislation, African Americans began to vote in number for the Democratic Party. Many had supported Franklin D. Roosevelt's New Deal programs, along with Harry S. Truman, John F. Kennedy, and Lyndon B. Johnson who had supported their causes. At the same time, in 1964, several white Southern politicians and state voters supported Republican Barry Goldwater for President over Democratic incumbent Lyndon B. Johnson. In what later became a trend, some switched party affiliations, notably Strom Thurmond of South Carolina. Richard Nixon's Southern strategy in the 1968 campaign is thought by many to have vastly accelerated this process. From Nixon's time to the present, the South has often voted Republican at the presidential level.

The term "New South" has also been used to refer to political leaders in the American South who embraced progressive ideas on education and economic growth and minimized racist rhetoric, even if not promoting integration. This term was most commonly associated with the wave of Southern governors elected in the late 1960s and 1970s, including Terry Sanford in North Carolina, Carl Sanders and Jimmy Carter in Georgia, and Albert Brewer in Alabama.

Similarly, the term "New South" has also been used to refer to areas of the South that have become more diverse and cosmopolitan over the last several decades.

=== Modern economy ===
The "New South" also meant to describe economic growth in the American South. Since the late 20th century, this can be seen in many ways. The second largest company in the world by revenue is Walmart, which is located in Bentonville, Arkansas. Two of the largest U.S. banks, Bank of America and Wells Fargo, have a major presence in Charlotte, North Carolina. Bank of America is headquartered there, and Wells Fargo has maintained much of the operation of Wachovia after acquiring it in 2008. Charlotte is also home to many other major corporations including Lowe's, Duke Energy, Family Dollar, Lendingtree and Honeywell.

Automotive manufacturing plants in U.S. have declined in cities like Detroit, Cleveland, Buffalo, and St. Louis, while lower wage, non-unionized work forces in the American South have attracted foreign manufacturers. Automobile manufacturers BMW, Toyota, Mercedes, Honda, Hyundai, Kia, Nissan, and Volkswagen have opened plants in states such as Georgia, Alabama, South Carolina, Kentucky, Tennessee, Texas, Mississippi, and West Virginia. Meanwhile, General Motors factories continue to operate in Kentucky, Louisiana, Tennessee and Texas, and two Ford factories operate in Kentucky's largest city of Louisville.

High-profile companies such as IBM, Intel, Verizon and Microsoft have major corporate presence in the Research Triangle of North Carolina. Additionally, several Fortune 500 companies, including Tesla, Inc. and a number of technology companies, are now headquartered in Austin, Texas, giving it the nickname of "Silicon Hills".

American Airlines Group, the largest airline in the world as of 2019, is headquartered in the Dallas–Fort Worth metroplex in Fort Worth. Dallas is also home to many global corporations, including the largest energy company in the world ExxonMobil, the largest Telecommunication company in the world AT&T, and the company where the microchip was first invented Texas Instruments. The Dallas-Fort Worth metro area is also the largest metro area in the South.

Delta Air Lines, one of the world's largest airlines, is headquartered in Hartsfield-Jackson Atlanta International Airport, currently the world’s busiest by passenger traffic. Atlanta is also home to many global corporations, including The Coca-Cola Company, UPS, CNN, Norfolk Southern, NCR, Mercedes-Benz, and Porsche.

== Cities of the New South ==
Cities of the New South are defined as cities that have seen a large boom over the last century, and cities that have become growing regional hubs.

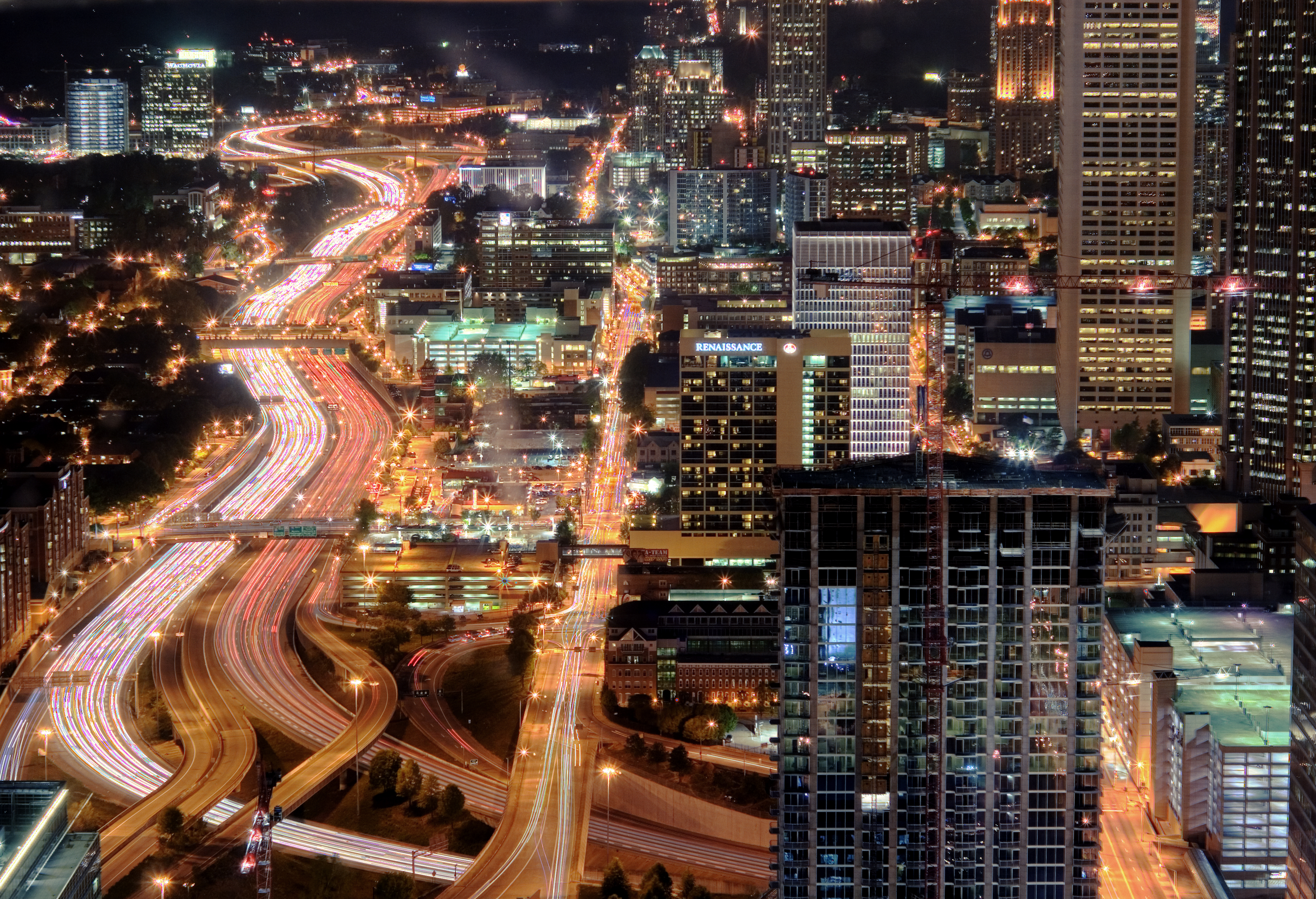
Atlanta, Georgia

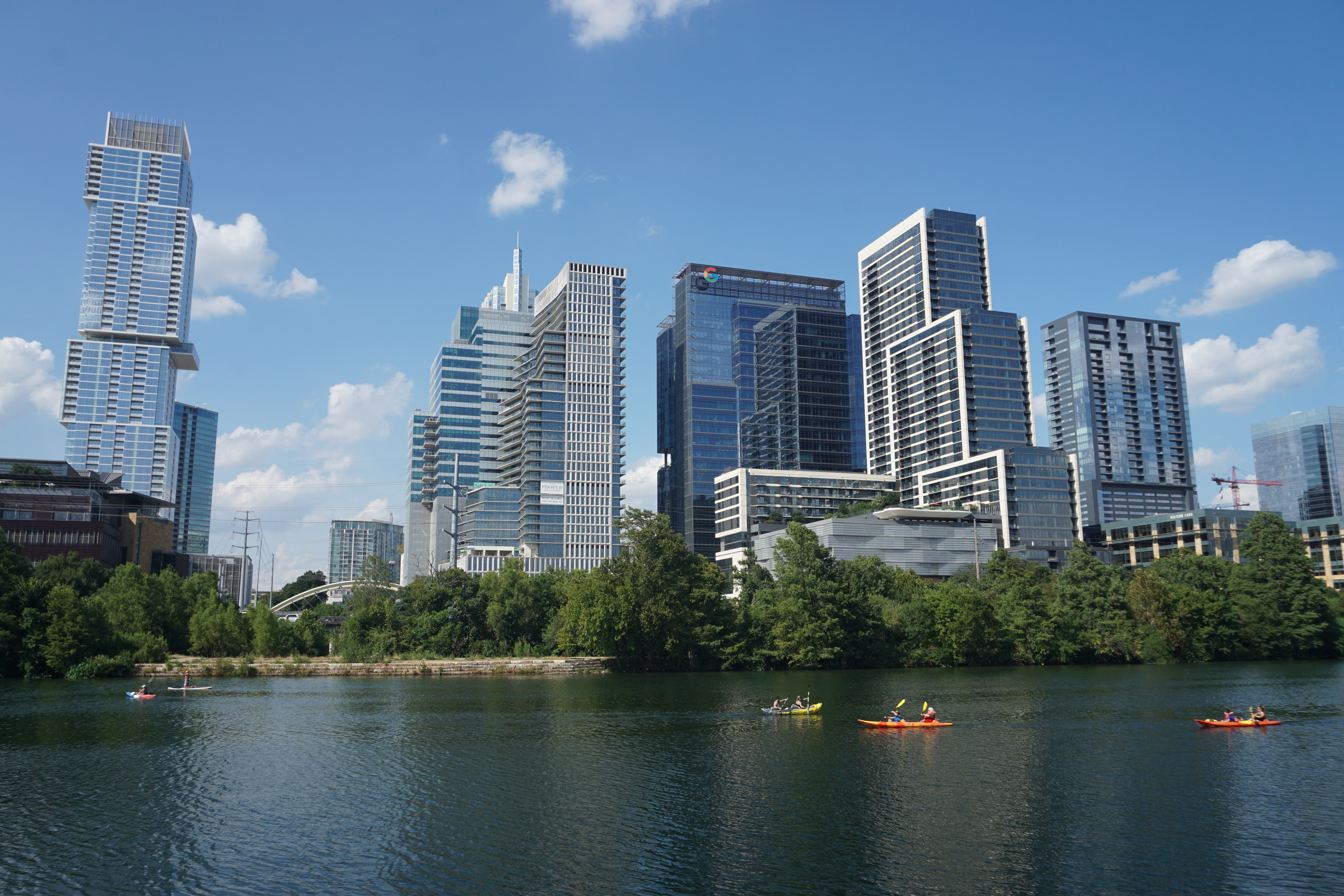
Austin, Texas

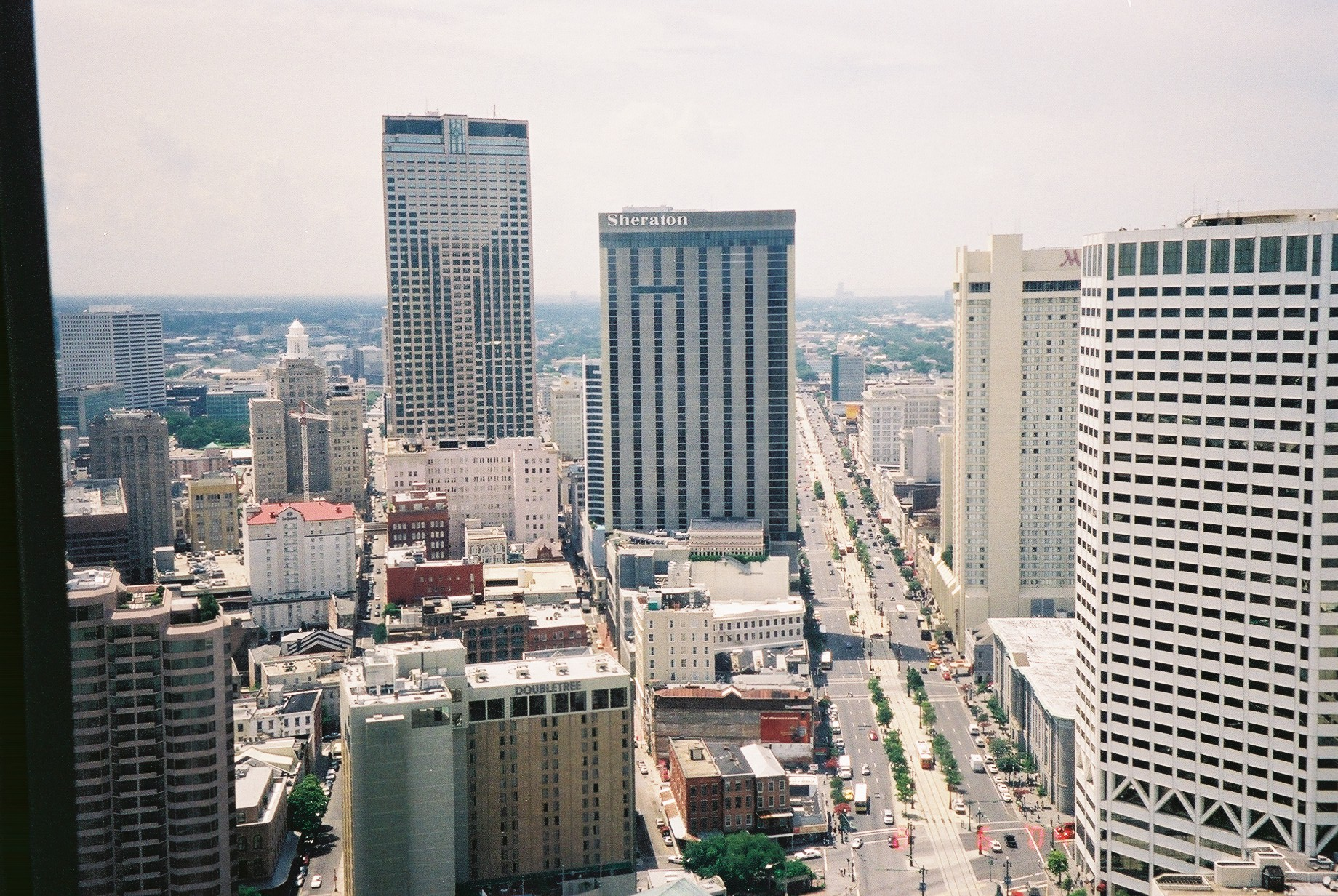
New Orleans, Louisiana

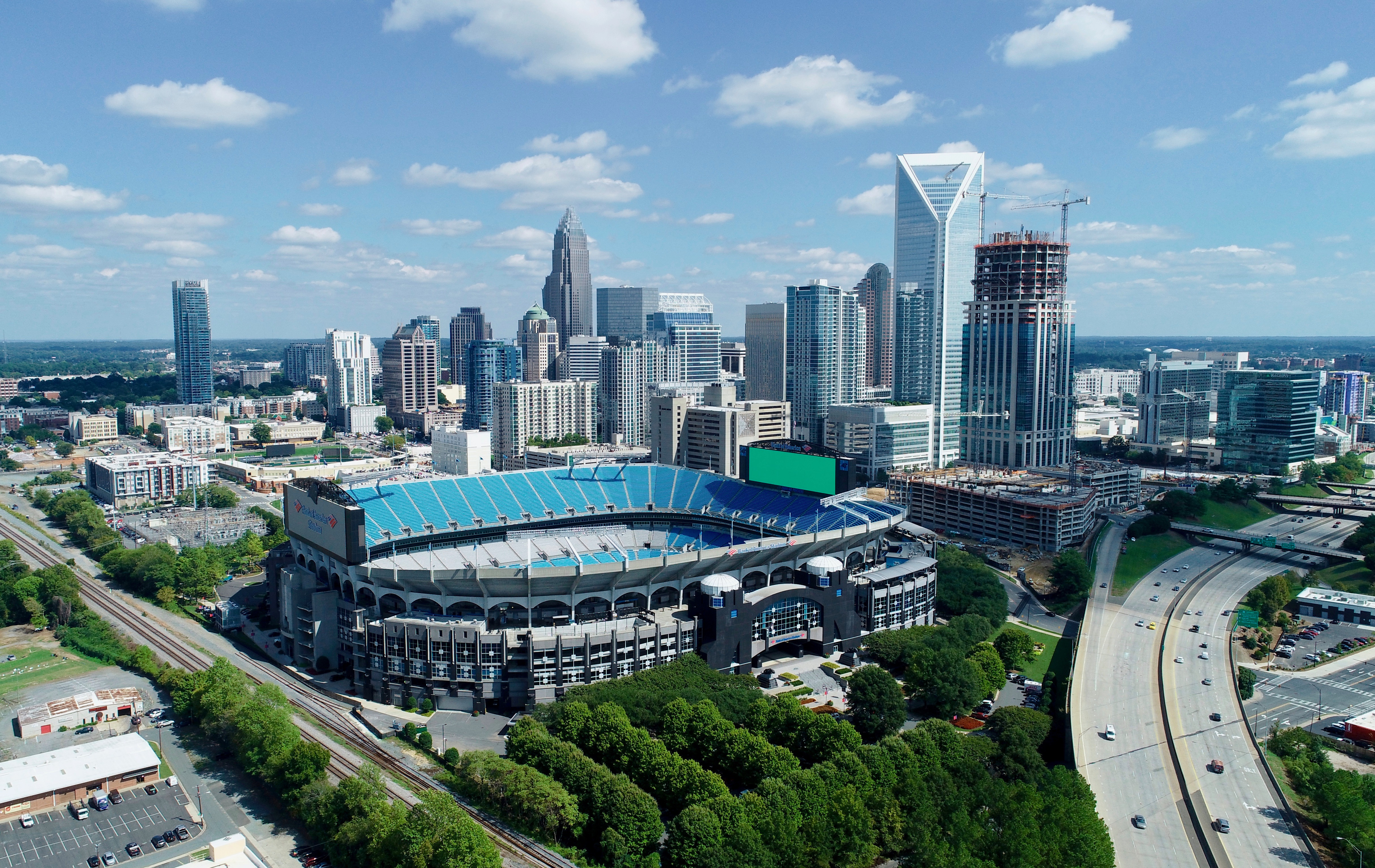
Charlotte, North Carolina

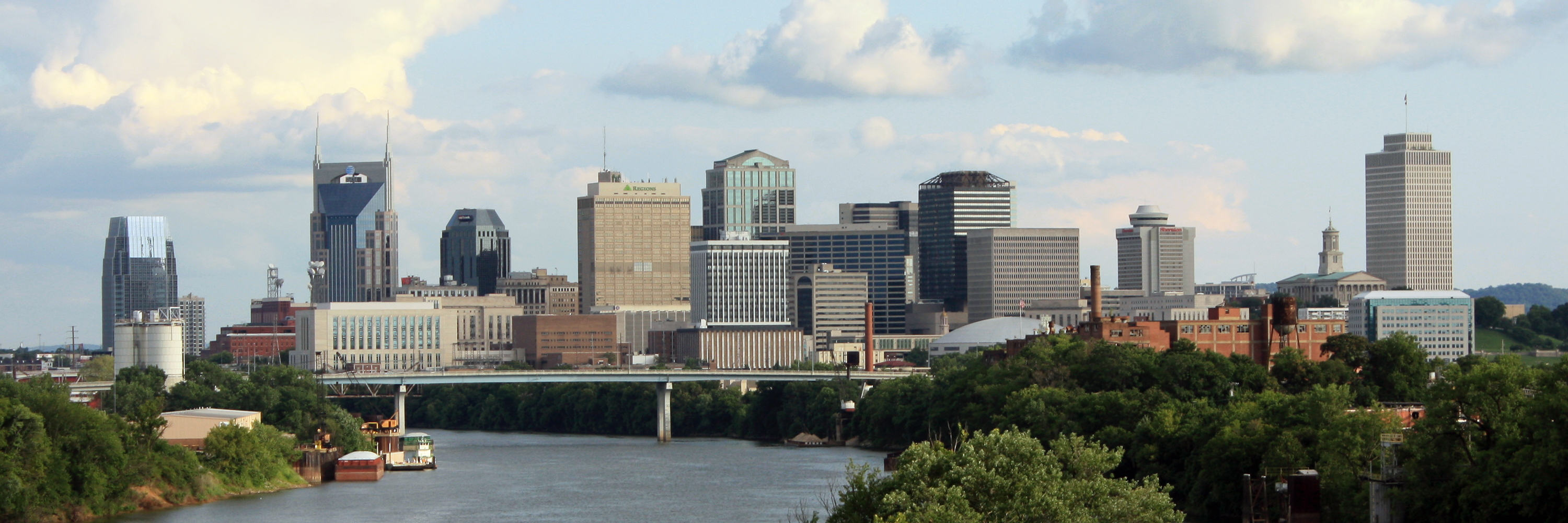
Nashville, Tennessee

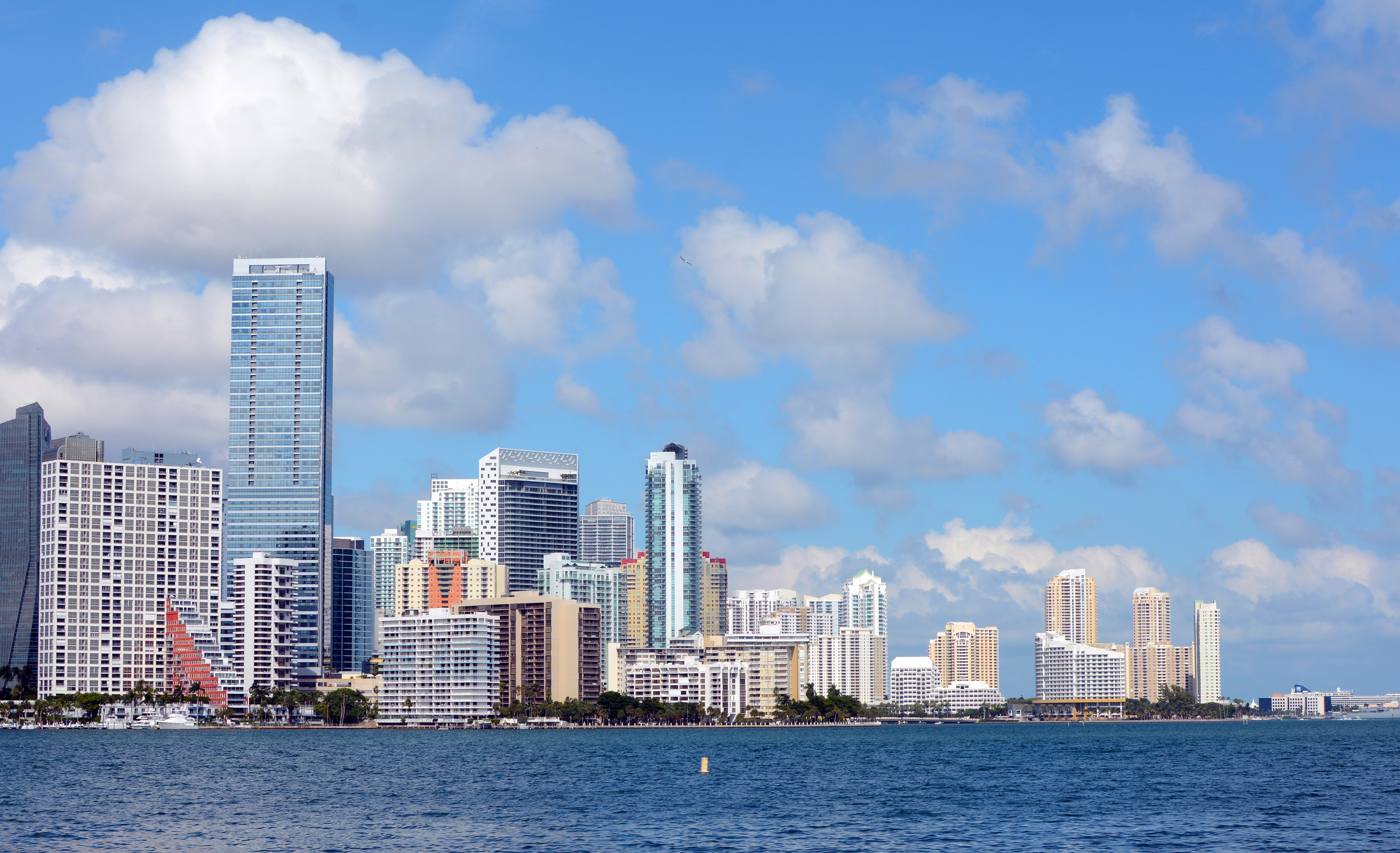
Miami, Florida

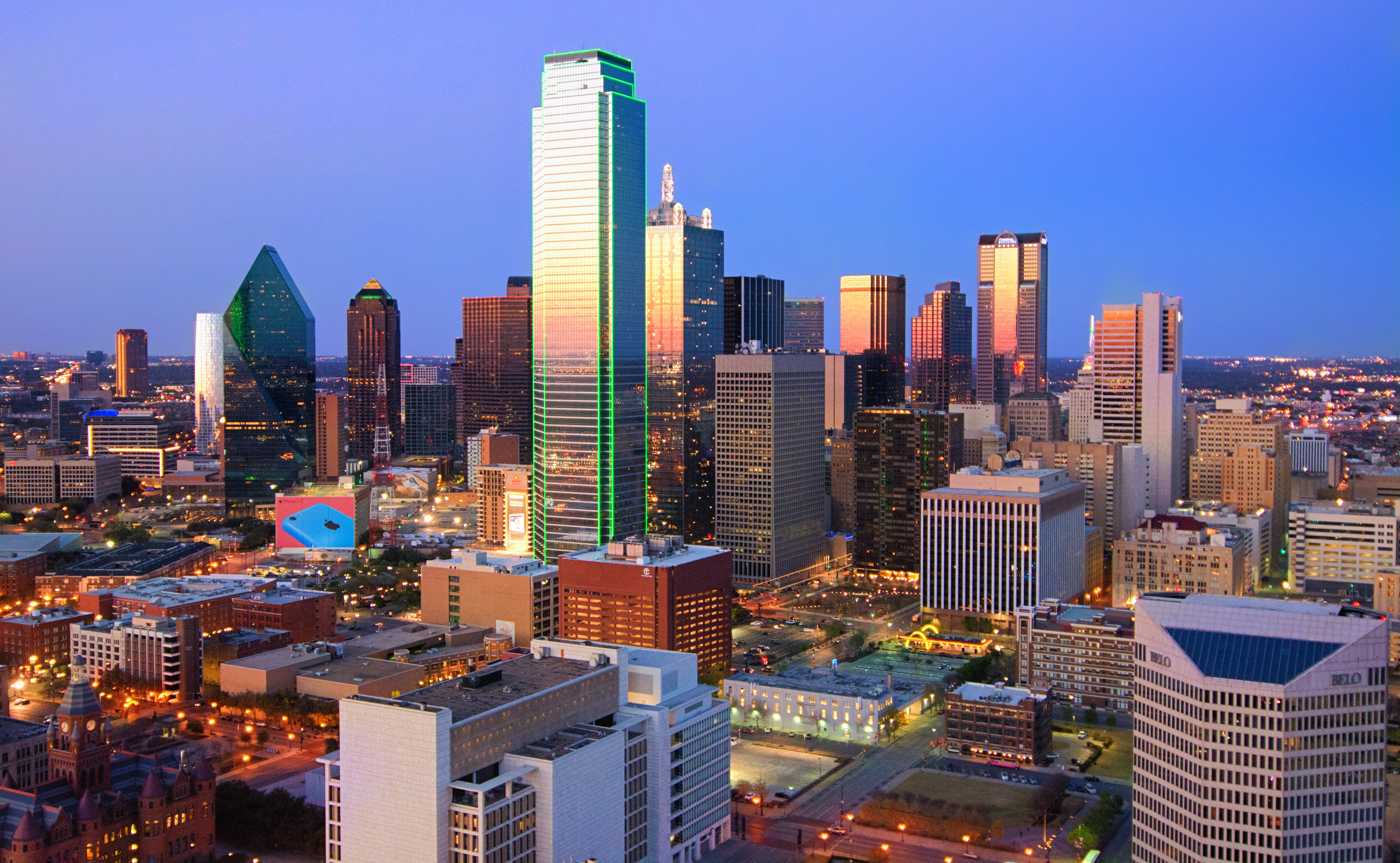
Dallas, Texas

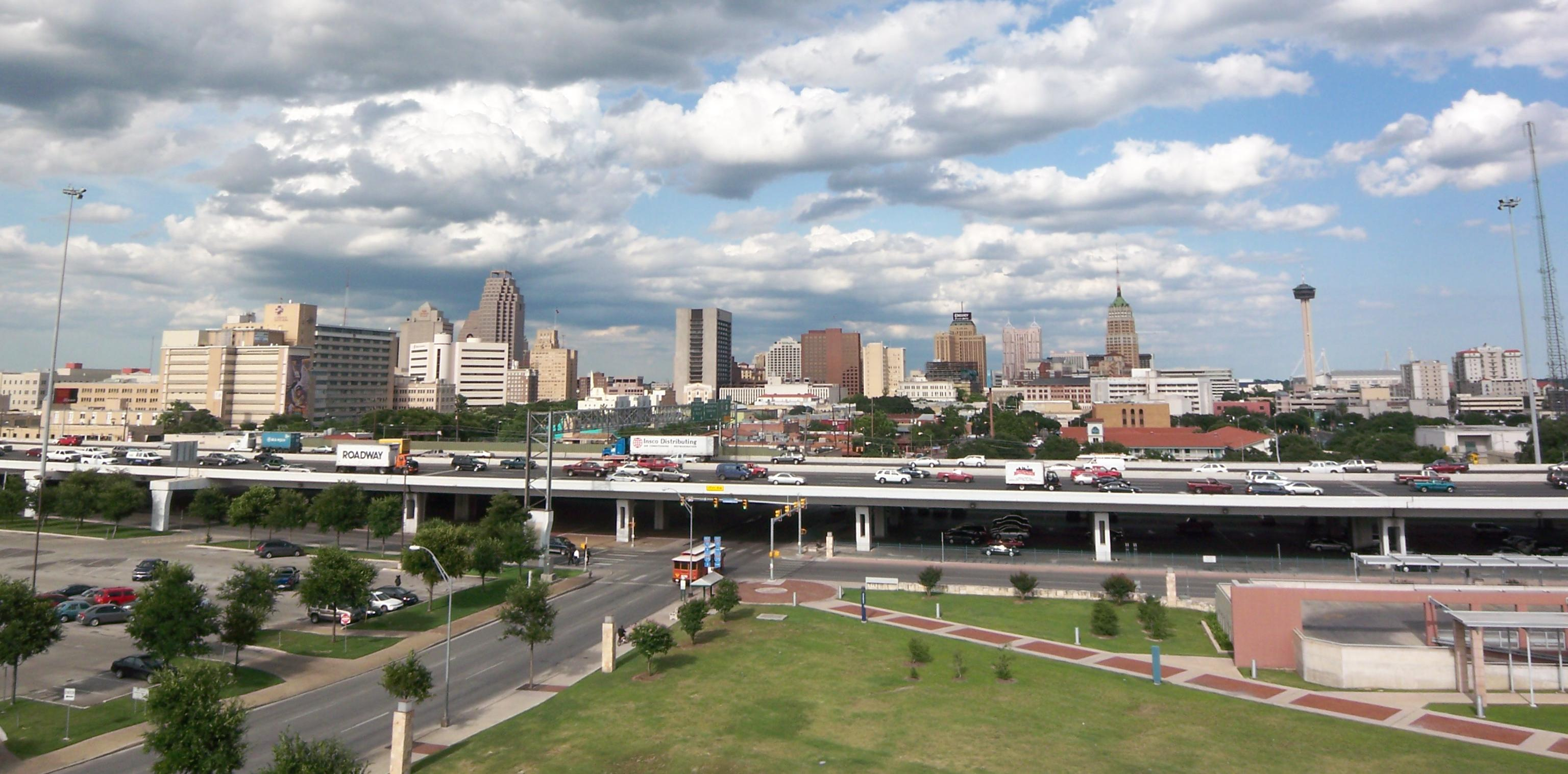
San Antonio, Texas

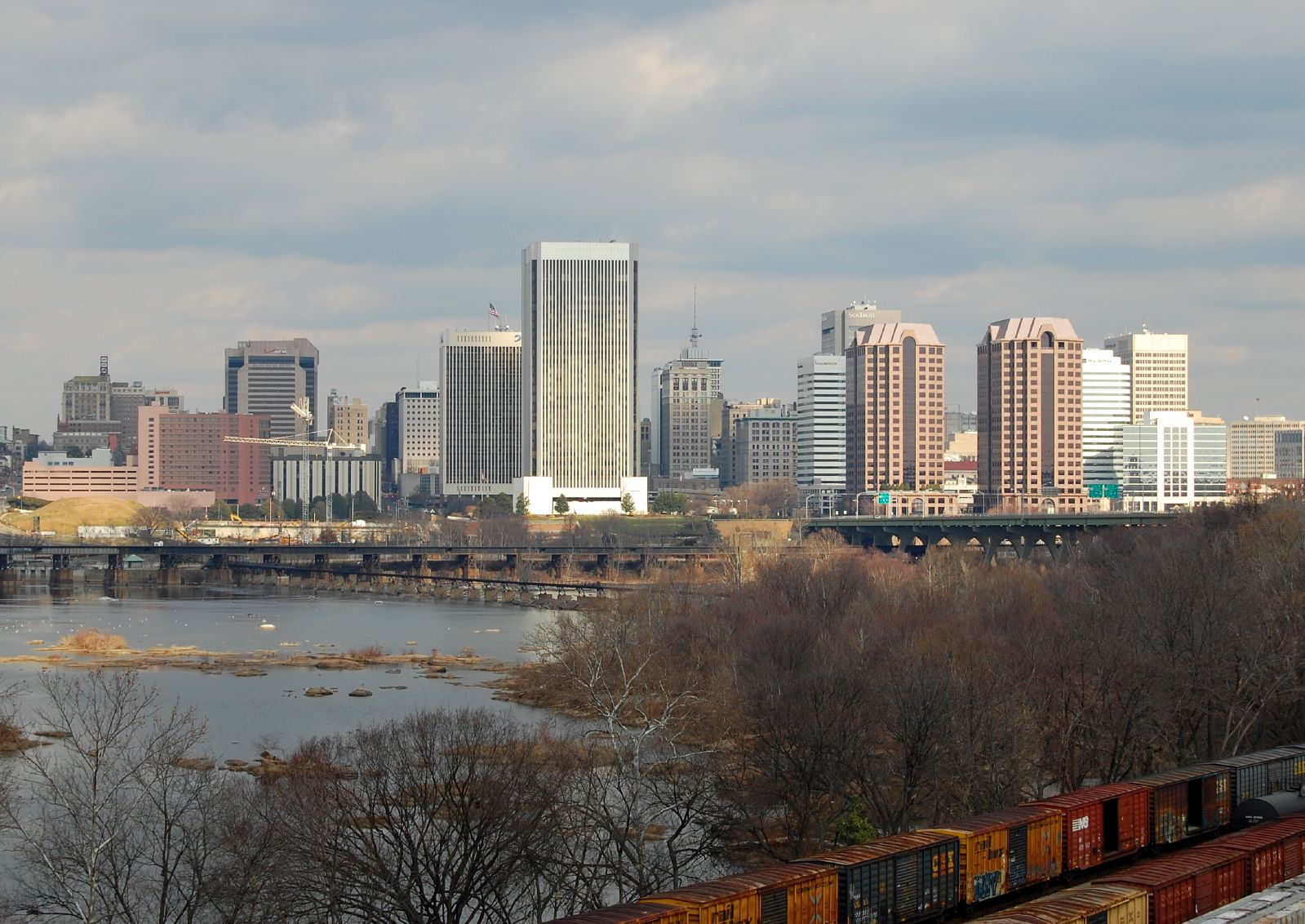
Richmond, Virginia

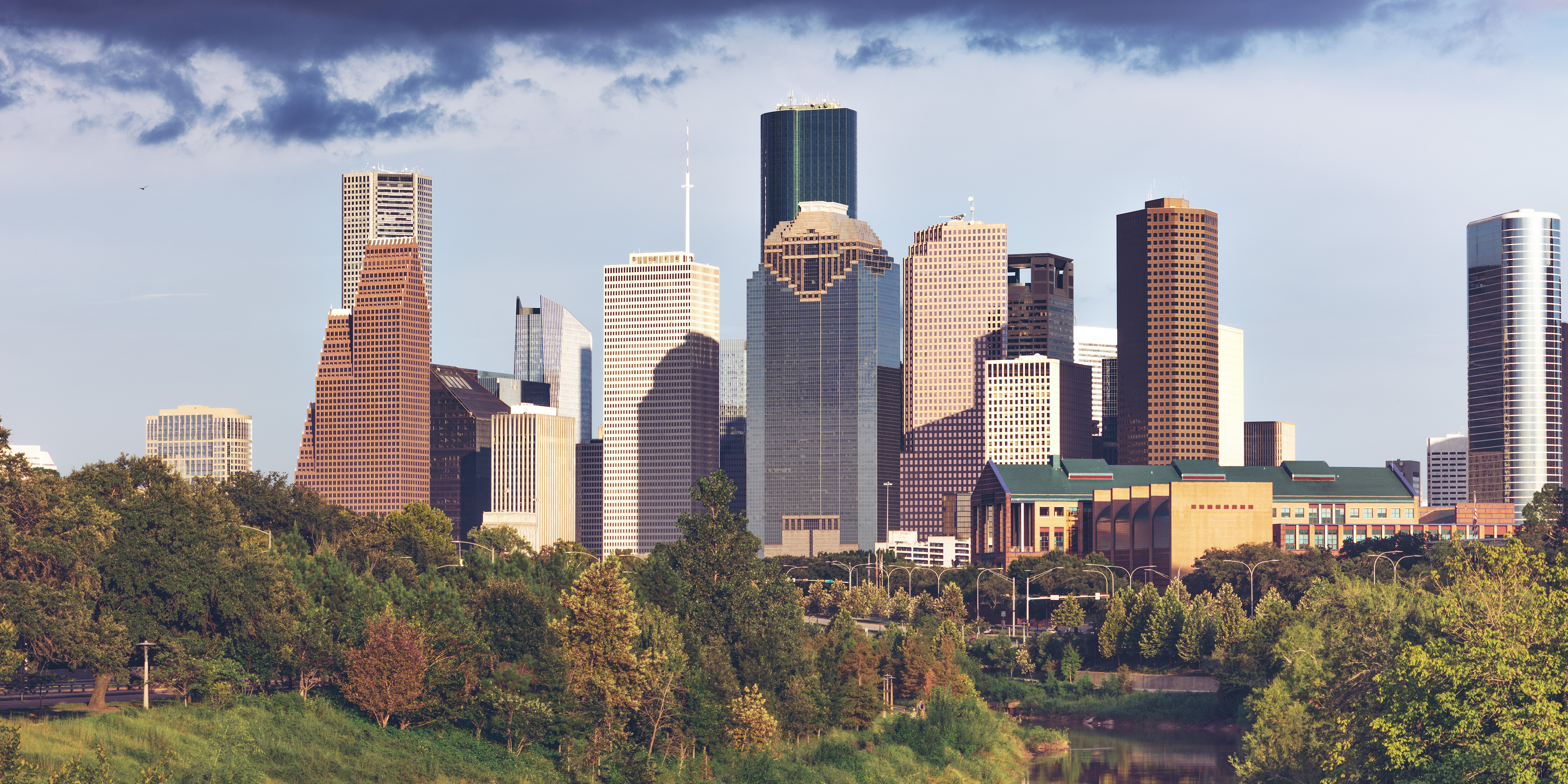
Houston, Texas

== See also ==
- Border states
- Deep South
- History of the Southern United States
- Solid South
- Sun Belt
- Upland South
