= Self-Taught =

2007 book by Heather A. Williams

- Author: Heather Andrea Williams
- Published: February 2007 (University of North Carolina Press)
- Pages: 320 pp.
- ISBN: 978-0-8078-5821-9

Self-Taught: African American Education in Slavery and Freedom is a book that tells the history of African American self-education from slavery through the Reconstruction Era. It was written by history professor Heather Andrea Williams and published in 2007 by the University of North Carolina Press.
