= Heather A. Williams =

Historian of slavery

- Born: Jamaica
- Citizenship: American
- Education: Saint Ann's School; Harvard College; Harvard Law School
- Occupation: Professor
- Employer: University of Pennsylvania
- Notable work: Self-Taught: African American Education in Slavery and Freedom; Help Me to Find My People: The African American Search for Family Lost in Slavery
- Title: Presidential Professor and Professor of Africana Studies

Heather A. Williams is a scholar of African American studies and lawyer. She serves as Presidential Professor and Professor of Africana Studies at the University of Pennsylvania.

Heather Andrea Williams moved to the United States from Jamaica with her family when she was 11 years old. She attended Saint Ann's School in Brooklyn, New York. She studied at Harvard College, graduating in 1978, and earned a J.D. from Harvard in 1981.

She practiced law in the public sector, serving as an assistant attorney general and section chief for the State of New York and as a trial attorney in the Civil Rights Division of the U.S. Department of Justice.

After teaching history at Saint Ann's School for two years, she earned a Ph.D. in American Studies from Yale University in 2002. After serving as a post-doctoral fellow at Smith College for two years, she moved to the history department at the University of North Carolina at Chapel Hill. There she taught from 2004 to 2014.

That year she was named Presidential Professor at the University of Pennsylvania and moved to Philadelphia. There she continues her work.

Her book Help Me to Find My People: The African American Search for Family Lost in Slavery (2012), about ads placed after emancipation to reunify families, was described as "a superbly researched and engaging analysis" by John G. Cox. He also criticized her writing for engaging "only very slightly with extant scholarship".

== Works ==
- Self-Taught: African American Education in Slavery and Freedom (University of North Carolina Press, 2005)
- Help Me to Find My People: The African American Search for Family Lost in Slavery (University of North Carolina Press, 2012)
- American Slavery: A Very Short Introduction (Oxford University Press, forthcoming)
