= Stephanie Camp =

American feminist historian

- Born: March 27, 1968
- Died: April 2, 2014 (aged 46); Seattle, Washington, US
- Occupations: Author, professor, historian
- Awards: Lillian Smith Book Award

Academic background
- Education: University of Pennsylvania, Yale University

Academic work
- Discipline: Historian
- Sub-discipline: Feminist history
- Notable works: Closer to Freedom: Enslaved Women and Everyday Resistance in the Plantation South

Stephanie M. Camp (March 27, 1968 – April 2, 2014) was an American feminist historian. Her book, Closer to Freedom: Enslaved Women and Everyday Resistance in the Plantation South (2004), led to a new understanding of how enslaved women resisted their captivity in the 1800s. The book won a Lillian Smith Book Award and received an honorable mention from the John Hope Franklin Prize; it was shortlisted for the Washington State Book Award.

She co-edited an anthology, New Studies in the History of American Slavery (2006), which was inspired by a symposium she organized at the University of Washington in 2002 called "New Studies in American Slavery", as well as a follow-up symposium organized by Herman Bennett at Rutgers University.

Camp grew up in Philadelphia, Pennsylvania, where she attended H.C. Lea Elementary School and graduated from Philadelphia High School for Girls. She earned her bachelor's and doctoral degrees from the University of Pennsylvania and her master's degree from Yale University. She worked from 2008 to 2010 as an associate professor at Rice University, and then until her death she worked as a professor at the University of Washington.

In 2007, Camp and a graduate student at the University of Washington organized a protest about Woodland Park Zoo's Maasai Journey program, which featured Maasai cultural elements in a zoo setting; Camp argued that it referenced a time when African people were grouped together with animals at world fairs.

== Death ==
She died of cancer in Seattle on April 2, 2014, aged 46. Shortly before her death she had begun to work on a book about race and beauty.
