= Remembering Reconstruction =

2017 United States history book

Remembering Reconstruction: Struggles over the Meaning of America's Most Turbulent Era
- First edition
- Authors: K. Stephen Prince; Jason Morgan Ward; Shawn Leigh Alexander; Justin Behrend; Carole Emberton; Mark Elliott; Natalie J. Ring; Samuel L. Shaffer; Elaine Parsons; Bruce E. Baker
- Language: English
- Subject: United States History: Civil War Period; United States Southern History
- Publisher: Louisiana State University Press
- Publication date: 2017
- Publication place: United States
- Pages: 304
- ISBN: 978-080716602-4
- Website: lsupress.org

Remembering Reconstruction: Struggles over the Meaning of America's Most Turbulent Era, published in 2017 by Louisiana State University Press, edited by Carole Emberton and Bruce E. Baker, with an introduction by W. Fitzhugh Brundage, is a collection of ten essays by historians of the Reconstruction era who examine the different collective memories of different social groups from the time of Jim Crow through the post-Civil Rights period.

== Summary of essays ==
=== Part I. White Supremacy and the Memories of Reconstruction ===
==== 1. Jim Crow Memory: Southern White Supremacists and the Regional Politics of Remembrance ====
This essay by K. Stephen Prince covers the years 1890-1910, the period when Jim Crow was established. During this period, Prince writes, not only were lynchings and race riots carried out to deny rights to the formerly enslaved people in the South, but white supremacist propaganda was also directed toward white people in the North, to actively promote the Jim Crow version of Reconstruction, in order to prevent federal government action to protect the rights of Blacks in the South. According to Prince, rewriting the memory of Reconstruction by white supremacists was the necessary companion strategy to Jim Crow.

In his essay Prince relies on writings of the period, including Why the Solid South? (1890) by Hilary A. Herbert; Studies in the American Race Problem (1908) by Alfred Holt Stone; The Leopard's Spots (1902) and The Clansman (1905) by Thomas Dixon Jr.; Red Rock (1898) and The Southerner's Problem (1904) by Thomas Nelson Page; and Myrta Lockett Avary's memoir, Dixie After the War (1906); as well the influences of Joel Chandler Harris, James K. Vardaman, and Clifton R. Breckinridge. Prince also discusses efforts during this period to overturn the right to vote granted by the Fifteenth Amendment, by activities of Alfred Holt Stone, George T. Winston, and Alfred Moore Waddell, who was a leader of the Wilmington massacre in 1898.

Prince concludes his essay with this observation:

The sheer frequency with which Jim Crow propagandists turned to Reconstruction highlights the centrality of this cultural work to the destruction of racial democracy. In the end, this white supremacist memory of Reconstruction was less a reflection of the past than an attempt to shape the future.

==== 2. Causes Lost and Found: Remembering and Refighting Reconstruction in the Roosevelt Era ====
This essay by Jason Morgan Ward examines the use of Reconstruction memory by white Southerners from the 1930s to the 1950s to protect Jim Crow practices from federal intervention. Examples in this essay in which the memory of Reconstruction was invoked in policy debates include the 1933 establishment of the Southern States Industrial Council to oppose standardized wages and working conditions by the National Recovery Administration that would disrupt the South's segregated 2-tier labor system; the 1937 anti-lynching bill debates; and the 1942 filibuster that killed a bill to outlaw the poll tax. He also discusses rhetoric of Martin Dies, Joseph P. Kamp, and the Constitutional Educational League, linking racial equality policies to Marxism and Communism; and the Dixiecrat movement.

As examples of proponents of the white Southerners' Reconstruction memory, Ward references the writings of William Watts Ball and Dixon's final novel, Flaming Sword, as well as statements of Southern politicians such as Josiah Bailey, Ellison Smith, Frank M. Dixon, and Theodore Bilbo. He also quotes white Southern moderates such as Virginius Dabney and Howard Odum who invoked that Reconstruction memory.

=== Part II. Black Counter Memories of Reconstruction ===
==== 3. T. Thomas Fortune, Racial Violence of Reconstruction, and the Struggle for Historical Memory ====
In this essay Shawn Leigh Alexander points to the role of Black writers and journalists from the 1880s through 1910 to articulate the Reconstruction memory of the Black community during this period. Special attention is given to T. Thomas Fortune, his personal knowledge of racist violence during Reconstruction in Florida, and his book Black and White: Land, Labor, and Politics in the South (1884). Alexander demonstrates how in that book Fortune relied extensively on firsthand testimony from the victims of racist violence included in the Report of the Joint Select Committee to Inquire into the Condition of Affairs in the Late Insurrectionary States, popularly known as the Ku Klux Klan hearings, to present a counter-narrative to white supremacist Reconstruction memory.

Alexander also cites Reconstruction in Mississippi (1901) by James Wilford Garner, Essays on Civil War and Reconstruction (1898, rev. edition 1904) by William A. Dunning, Civil War and Reconstruction in Alabama (1905) by Walter L. Fleming, and Ku Klux Klan: Its Origin, Growth and Disbandment (repr. 1905) by John C. Lester and Daniel L. Wilson; and includes Fortune's poem "Bartow Black."

==== 4. Facts, Memories and History: John R. Lynch and the Memory of Reconstruction in the Age of Jim Crow ====
In this essay Justin Behrend examines John R. Lynch's autobiographical critique of Reconstruction, The Facts of Reconstruction (1913). After describing the background of the author (born into slavery fourteen years before the Civil War, serving as a Republican Congressman during Reconstruction, and publishing his book 31 years after leaving office), Behrend distinguishes Lynch's writing from that of T. Thomas Fortune (discussed in the previous essay), in that Lynch downplayed the political violence and instead focused on the successes of Reconstruction. The book also challenged the scholarly writings of William A. Dunning and the Dunning School, which "argued that carpetbaggers and scalawags tricked illiterate and inexperienced African American men to vote with the Republican Party.

Behrend discusses at length several major themes of Lynch's book, including:

- the benefits of Reconstruction in establishing true democracy in the South
- debunking the myth of "Negro Domination" by describing the manner in which Black political power was expressed during Reconstruction
- debunking the myth that Black politicians drew the color line and shared the blame for racial segregation

Behrend also relates Lynch's descriptions of meetings he had with people during his political career, including with President Ulysses S. Grant and Lucius Q. C. Lamar.

In the last section of the essay Behrend speculates on why Lynch's 1913 book did not include memories of violence during Reconstruction, and observes that Lynch's later autobiography, published in the 1930s, did include memories of political violence.

==== 5. The Freedwoman's Tale: Reconstruction Remembered in the Federal Writers' Project Ex-Slave Narratives ====
In this essay Carole Emberton describes an approach to using narratives of formerly enslaved people collected by the Federal Writers' Project during the 1930s for historical research, and applies that approach to memories of Reconstruction recorded in those narratives. She begins by relating the narrative of Hannah Irwin in which Irwin recalls events from her childhood during Reconstruction involving the Ku Klux Klan.

After discussing issues on the use and usefulness of these narratives and contrasting them with "official" counter narratives by leading black intellectuals such as those examined in the previous two essays, Emberton proposes using a technique of "triangulating" NWP narratives with other sources in order to draw conclusions from the narratives. Next she applies this technique to Irwin's narrative by comparing elements of that narrative with 1870 US Census entries for people in the narrative, the events timeline, struggles over land control during this time period, and using references and quotes from other recent historical writings relevant to the time of events in the narrative. Emberton then sums up her case for the value of this resource to historical research:

Ultimately, it does not matter that we cannot verify every aspect of Irwin's testimony. Her testimony, along with that of the thousands of others archived in the FWP ex-slave narratives, are valuable not for the reliability of any information about specific people or events they might convey but rather for 'the essence of an ineffable experience,' ... [that] offers a more open yet nonetheless critical framework for using this type of oral history.... These testimonies lend insight if not conclusive answers to questions about the experience of being newly freed in the rural South that no other sources can give."

In the rest of the essay she uses additional narratives from the collection and applies her triangulation technique to the set of narrations.

=== Part III. Reconstruction and the Creation of American Empire ===
==== 6. The Lessons of Reconstruction: Debating Race and Imperialism in the 1890s ====
In this essay Mark Elliott examines the Lake Mohonk Conferences on the Negro Question of 1890 and 1891, during which the process of reconciliation between white Northerners and Southerners was advanced. Elliott says a study of the conferences "provides a unique window into the process of public memory in formation." Elliott describes the debates over memories of Reconstruction, following the election of 1888 in which Republicans won the Presidency and both chambers of Congress for the first time since President Grant, in which legislation was proposed to protect Black voting rights in the South and to fund Black public education. During those debates Congressional debates, the first Mohonk Conference on the Negro Question was held in June 1880, attended by former slaveholders, abolitionists, members of both political parties, and veterans from both armies of the Civil War.

Elliott states that to understand the import of what happened at the two conferences, they must be seen in relation to the westward expansion into Indigenous lands and imperialist ideologies of "civilization" and "uplift," and discusses their historical context, such as the earlier Lake Mohonk Conferences on the "Indian Problem" in the 1880s, the Dawes Act, and the "civilization" policies of both, which were now being advanced as a model for answering the "Negro Question."

Of the consequences of the conferences, Elliot observes:

They readily agreed that Reconstruction had been a mistake from which the nation had to learn. But the ideological reconciliation they sought had unintended results. Rather than improve race relations in the South, the kind of concessions made at Mohonk merely encouraged the coming of disenfranchisement and legalized segregation.

The essay then discusses the debates at the conferences and how those debates shaped the changing memories of Reconstruction and resulting policies. Among the legacies of the conferences, Elliot identifies the abandonment of seeking federal legislation to protect the rights of Blacks in the South, replacing it with a policy of uplift, and the future application of uplift and civilizing policies to new territories brought under control of the United States following the Spanish–American War.

==== 7. A New Reconstruction for the South ====
Natalie J. Ring opens this essay by discussing articles published in The New Republic in 1915 about the lynching of Leo Frank in Georgia and comparing conditions in Georgia with those in Haiti, which had recently been invaded by the US Marines following decades of US expansion that included taking control of the Hawaiian Islands, Puerto Rico, Guam, and the Philippines. There follows an exploration of the parallels between federal policy in the South and in US Imperialism. The shared policy foundation, Ring contends, was uplift and readjustment. Uplift policy was based on sociocultural evolutionary theory; readjustment was conceived of as a new kind of reconstruction, a social and economic restructuring.

Ring compares the historical memory of this period as presented in the writings of historians David Blight and Caroline Janney, and presents her own conclusion that readjustment in the South was not based on the memories of Reconstruction of white supremacists. Ring then discusses the reliance on sociocultural evolutionary theory in advocating for these policies both in the South and abroad, citing Edgar Gardner Murphy's book The Problems of the Present South (1903) and the writings of Walter Hines Page, Albert Shaw, Charles W. Dabney, and others; and academic discussions of the "New Reconstruction," "racial readjustment," and "uplift." After briefly highlighting commentaries following World War II on movements to advance civil and political rights, Ring concludes:

The various articulations of the word reconstruction show us that the representation of Reconstruction is malleable and dynamic, able to lend symbolic power to the rhetoric of liberalism as it has waxed and waned throughout the course of the twentieth century and into the twenty-first.

==== 8. "A Bitter Memory Upon Which Terms of Peace Would Rest": Woodrow Wilson, the Reconstruction of the South, and the Reconstruction of Europe ====
In this essay Samuel L. Schaffer discusses the impact of Woodrow Wilson's experience of Reconstruction on his time as President of the United States. Wilson, a white Southerner, five years old when the Civil War started and twenty-one years old when federal troops withdrew at the end of Reconstruction, personally witnessed the war and its aftermath. Schaffer presents Wilson's views on Reconstruction as expressed in an article by him in The Atlantic Monthly in 1901: The Radical Republicans treated the southern states as conquered territories, and the goal was not to rehabilitate the southern states but to punish them, to enfranchise the formerly enslaved people, to humiliate the South, and to establish permanent political power. This, Schaffer writes, was a manufactured and grossly distorted memory. It also, according to Schaffer, led Wilson to conclusions about the consequences of imposing harsh conditions on the loser in war, and of turning the correct political and social order upside down.

Schaffer next turns to Wilson's opposition to entering World War I, his stance after the United States entered the war, and his position on negotiations after the war: that there be peace without victory and that the post-war peace not impose harsh terms on Germany, a position that Schaffer finds to be an outgrowth of his views on Reconstruction, though not explicitly expressed by Wilson in those terms. Another theme presented in this essay is Wilson's views on racial hierarchy founded in white supremacy, and how that view was reflected in the post-war colonial order established under the League of Nations.

One conclusion for historians more generally that Schaffer draws here is, "When we think about diplomatic history and international relations, it is important to consider the historical understandings of the individuals involved."

=== Part IV. Remembering Reconstruction in the Post-Civil Rights Era ===
==== 9. The Cultural Work of the Ku Klux Klan in US History Textbooks, 1883-2015 ====
Elaine Parsons begins this essay with a description of why the Ku Klux Klan was first included in history textbooks in the Progressive era, and then reviews the portrayal of the Klan in those books, discussing changes in the narrative in successive periods: the Progressive Era, the period during and after World War II, the Civil Rights era of the 1960s and 1970s, and the years since then. Her presentation includes comments on changing perspectives in past analyses of history textbooks, the demands of school officials, contemporaneous historians' views on Reconstruction during those times, and her own analysis of quotes from the textbooks themselves.

At the outset she states what her research has revealed:

Even as the valuation of the Klan transformed in the mid-twentieth century, many of the basic structural elements of the Progressive-era textbook Klan narrative have persisted. The four most troubling and tenacious of these persistencies are: (1) to sensationalize the Klan as mysterious, entertaining, or beyond critical comprehension; (3) to present white people as active agents and black people as passive and helpless; (3) to depict the Klan as radically discontinuous with other forms of racial oppression occurring before, after, or alongside it; and (4) to make the Klan stand in for all white-on-black violence, allowing the reader to believe that such violence had geographic and social limits, a beginning, and, most comfortingly, and end.

After presenting her analysis, she concludes:

The Klan in history textbooks conceals more than it reveals; despite having been so sanitized and refigured, it exculpates the perpetrators of racial oppression in much the same way that Progressive-era professionalizers had intended. It stands in the place of a more subtle, extensive, and honest analysis of racial violence in our history.

==== 10. Wade Hampton's Last Parade: Memory of Reconstruction in the 1970 South Carolina Tricentennial ====
In this essay Bruce E. Baker examines the memory of Reconstruction on the occasion of South Carolina's Tricentennial celebrations. Contrasting the Wade Hampton Red Shirts parades of the past (held as reenactments to commemorate the end of Reconstruction in South Carolina), with the climate in 1970, Baker sees the 1970s as a "brief moment" in which South Carolina came closest to a publicly supported culture of racial inclusiveness, before reversing course in the 1980s and 90s, and describes the political players and economic conditions during the 1960s that produced that climate.

Baker then turns to the planning for and celebrations of the Tricentennial. Planning was decentralized to the county level, allowing examination of the place of Reconstruction memory at the grassroots. Many observances ignored Reconstruction, while a few gave it central significance. Two of the latter, Anderson and Orangeburg, are discussed at length by Baker.

Baker draws some conclusions about South Carolina memories of Reconstruction:

Stories of Reconstruction had been a constant clamor in the historical memory of South Carolina for generations, but by the 1970s that had turned to stillness. Just at the moment when the work of revisionist scholars was finally winning the argument in the history books, most South Carolinians simply stopped thinking about Reconstruction.... If South Carolinians had used memory of Reconstruction for generations as a way to argue about black citizenship, with whites using horror stories about "Negro domination" to ward it off and African Americans holding Reconstruction up as an unfinished revolution, then once African Americans could vote and hold office, could enter public life on an equal basis, and could send their children to desegregated schools, then the salience of memories of Reconstruction was gone, at least for a while.

== Reviews ==
- A review by M. T. Chiles in the Virginia Magazine of History and Biography, published by the Virginia Historical Society, stated, "Written by a combination of new and veteran historians, the introduction and essays in Remembering Reconstruction are exceptionally valuable because they reveal the power of historical memory," and "Most importantly, these essays reflect that historians of modern America are changing how they interpret historic memory. By focusing less on historiographical debates and more on socially constructed identities, the authors place historic memory at the intersection of social, political, and cultural events."
- Mark A. Lause writing in The Journal of American History observed, "Each of these essays makes a solid contribution to remembering Reconstruction. A focus on 'memory' or 'identity' does not make a collection surrounding an already-broad subject more centered. That said, the virtue of an anthology is the breadth of its work by individual scholars grounded in their own aspirations, assumptions, and perspectives. For this reason, if no other, greater diversity can provide wider perspectives."
- April E. Holm in the Journal of Southern History, published by the Southern Historical Association commented, "Taken as a whole, [the essays] remind us that Americans have remembered — and forgotten — Reconstruction in complex and challenging ways. They make a case for the lasting importance of those memories even as popular consensus around the meaning of the period has eroded."
- Gordon Berg, in the history magazine America's Civil War, wrote, "Taken together, these deeply researched and cogently written essays comprise a kind of magic lantern that illuminates how many of today’s contentious social issues, like equality before the law, concepts of race, and rights of citizenship, were born during those tumultuous years [of Reconstruction, between 1865 and 1877]."
- David T. Ballantyne in American Nineteenth Century History wrote: "Remembering Reconstruction is essential reading for Reconstruction memory scholars."
