= G. Mildred Thompson =

C. Mildred Thompson (1881–1975) was a history professor and for 25 years served as dean at Vassar College. She was a prominent feminist and celebrity.

She studied with William Archibald Dunning at Columbia University, he became known for his leadership in the white supremacist Dunning School. She authored a book on Reconstruction era Georgia as part of a series produced by his graduate students.
