= Walter Fleming =

Walter Fleming may refer to:

- Walther Flemming (1843–1905), German scientist
- Walter L. Fleming (1874–1932), American historian
  - SS Walter L. Fleming, a Liberty ship
- Walter M. Fleming (1839–1913), American physician and surgeon
