= William Archibald Dunning =

American historian noted for the "Dunning School"

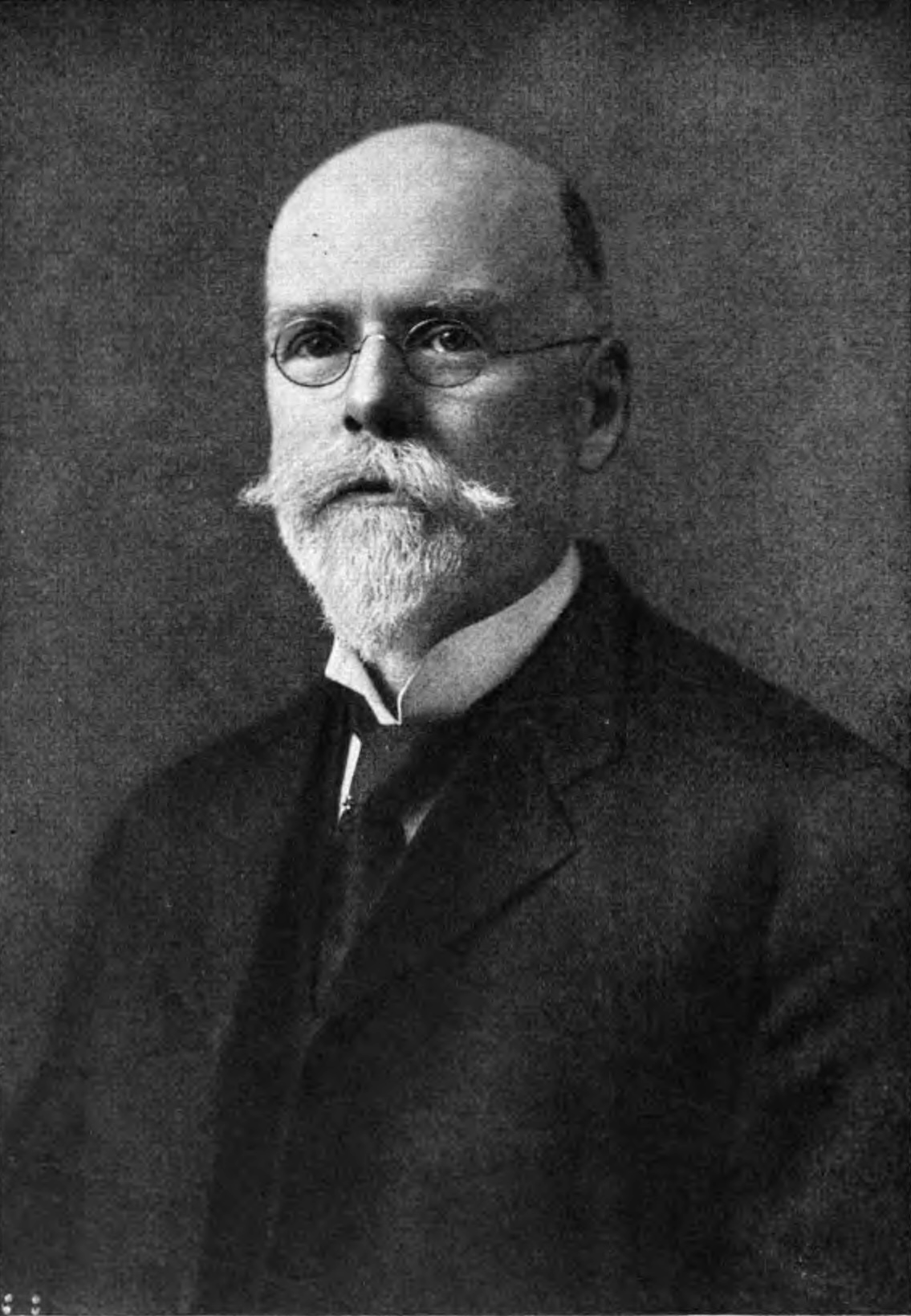
- Born: 12 May 1857; Plainfield, New Jersey, United States
- Died: 25 August 1922 (aged 65); New York City, New York, United States
- Occupations: Professor, author

Academic background
- Education: Columbia University
- Thesis: The Constitution of the United States in Civil War and Reconstruction: 1860–1867
- Influences: Heinrich von Treitschke

Academic work
- School or tradition: Dunning School
- Institutions: Columbia University
- Notable students: Charles Merriam
- Influenced: Harry Elmer Barnes; James Wilford Garner; Carlton J. H. Hayes; Walter L. Fleming; J. G. de Roulhac Hamilton; Charles W. Ramsdell; U. B. Phillips

William Archibald Dunning (12 May 1857 – 25 August 1922) was an American historian and political scientist at Columbia University noted for his work on the Reconstruction era of the United States. His writings, together with those of his numerous students, gave rise to what became informally known as the "Dunning school" interpretation of Reconstruction, which dominated perceptions for much of the first half of the 20th century.

The scholarly publications of the Dunning School have been criticized for advocating white supremacist interpretations, especially their "blatant use of the discipline of history for reactionary ends" and for offering "scholarly legitimacy to the disenfranchisement of southern blacks and to the Jim Crow system."

== Early life and education ==
Born in Plainfield, New Jersey, Dunning was the son of a successful businessman who enjoyed the classics. Dunning earned degrees at Columbia University (B.A. 1881, M.A. 1884, and Ph.D. 1885). He spent a year in Berlin studying European history under Heinrich von Treitschke.

Soon after his return and beginning his academic career, in 1888 he married Charlotte E. Loomis. They had no children. She died in 1917.

== Career ==
Dunning began teaching at Columbia and was steadily promoted on the academic ladder (fellow, lecturer, instructor, adjunct professor, and full professor); in 1903 he was appointed as the Francis Lieber Professor of History and Political Philosophy.

He published his PhD dissertation, The Constitution of the United States in Civil War and Reconstruction: 1860–1867 (1897), at age 40 after he had been teaching for several years.

His scholarly essays, collected in Essays on the Civil War and Reconstruction and Related Topics (1897), included work that explained the legal basis for the destruction of slavery, an institution he opposed. His survey Reconstruction, Political and Economic: 1865–1877 (1907), for the "American Nation" series, set the tone. Dunning believed that his Reconstruction book was too superficial. He felt that it had distracted him from his major work on the history of political theory.

Dunning had a dual role in history and political science. He was a long-time editor of Political Science Quarterly. He was a leading expert in the history of political thought, as expressed in his trilogy: A History of Political Theories: Ancient and Medieval (1902), From Luther to Montesquieu (1905), and From Rousseau to Spencer (1920).

Although his health was poor after 1903, Dunning wrote numerous scholarly articles and book reviews for the American Historical Review and the Political Science Quarterly, which he edited from 1894 to 1903. Dunning was a founder and long-time activist of the American Historical Association, becoming AHA president in 1913. He served as the president of the American Political Science Association in 1922.

In 1919 Dunning testified as an expert witness in a jury trial, one of the first historians to do. In 1916, the Chicago Tribune called Henry Ford "an anarchist". Ford sued the Tribune and its publisher Robert McCormick for libel, asking for $1M in damages. Ford's attorney, former US Representative Alfred Lucking, retained Dunning to testify as to the definition and meaning of the term "anarchist." The Michigan jury determined that Ford was libeled but awarded him only six cents damages. Today, historians routinely testify as expert witnesses, and it could be said that Dunning established a precedent in doing so. Dunning's testimony may not have made much of an impact on the jury, since the jurors had not attended college, and other witnesses of high public standing testified, such as Major Generals Leonard Wood and William Harding Carter.

Evaluating his contributions in 2000, Smith says Dunning was far more important as a graduate teacher than as a research scholar. Columbia was a leading producer of PhDs, and Dunning directed much graduate work in U.S. history and in European political thought. His students included future leading scholars and academic entrepreneurs, such as Charles Merriam, Harry Elmer Barnes, James Wilford Garner, and Carlton J. H. Hayes. He also mentored C. Mildred Thompson, the history professor who became dean at Vassar College. Thompson drafted the charter for UNESCO (the United Nations Education, Scientific and Cultural Organization), and worked for civil rights in Atlanta.

Dunning gave lifelong support to his students, providing continuous encouragement in their careers. They honored him with a Festschrift in 1914: Studies in Southern History and Politics Inscribed to William Archibald Dunning ... by His Former Pupils the Authors.

== School of thought ==
Many Southerners (and some Northerners) took PhDs in History under Dunning and returned to the South for academic careers, where they dominated the major history departments. Those who wrote dissertations on Reconstruction included James W. Garner, Walter L. Fleming, J. G. de Roulhac Hamilton, Charles W. Ramsdell, C. Mildred Thompson, William Watson Davis, and Thomas S. Staple. They comprised the so-called "Dunning School". Their interpretation of post-Civil War Reconstruction was the dominant theory taught in American universities through much of the first half of the 20th century. Bradley says, "The Dunning school condemned Reconstruction as a conspiracy by vindictive radical Republicans to subjugate southern whites at bayonet point, using federal troops to prop up corrupt state regimes led by an unholy trinity of carpetbaggers, scalawags, and freedmen." Bradley notes that the Dunning interpretation in the 1930s and 1940s also "received compelling treatment in such popular works as Claude Bowers's The Tragic Era and Margaret Mitchell’s Gone with the Wind—both the best-selling novel and the blockbuster film."

According to Dunning, Reconstruction's players include the "carpetbaggers", particularly new white arrivals from the North, whom the Dunning School portrayed as greedy interlopers exploiting the South and dominating the Republican Party; the "scalawags", native southern whites collaborating with the Republicans; and the freedmen, whom the Dunning School portrayed as tools of the carpetbaggers with little independent voice. He was sympathetic to the white Southerners, whom they saw as being stripped of their rights after 1865 by a vengeful North. They assumed the black vote was controlled by carpetbaggers.

Dunning and his followers portrayed former planters, the elite political, social and economic class, as honorable people with the South's best interests in mind.

Dunning wrote from the point of view of the northern Democrats and portrayed the Radical Republicans as men who violated American traditions and were motivated by vengeance after the American Civil War.

== Criticism ==
W. E. B. Du Bois led the criticism of the Dunning School, taking it to task in the introduction of Black Reconstruction in America. Historian Eric Foner wrote that the Dunning School "offered scholarly legitimacy to the disenfranchisement of southern blacks and to the Jim Crow system that was becoming entrenched as they were writing", and that "the alleged horrors of Reconstruction helped freeze the mind of the white South in bitter opposition to any change in the region’s racial system." Foner adds that "the fundamental flaw in the Dunning School was the authors’ deep racism", and that "racism shaped not only their interpretations of history but their research methods and use of historical evidence."

Dunning referred to freedmen as "barbarous" and defended the racist black codes as "a conscientious and straightforward attempt to bring some sort of order" out of the aftermath of war and emancipation. Dunning wrote that the freedmen were not "on the same social, moral and intellectual plane with the whites" and that "restrictions in respect to bearing arms, testifying in court, and keeping labor contracts were justified by the well-established traits and habits of the negroes".

In Black Reconstruction in America (1935), Du Bois characterized Dunning's Reconstruction, Political and Economic as a "standard, anti-Negro" text. Du Bois noted, "Dunning admits that 'The legislation of the reorganized governments, under cover of police regulations and vagrancy laws, had enacted severe discrimination against the freedmen in all the common civil rights.'"

Historian Howard K. Beale was a leader of the "revisionist" school of the 1930s that broke with the Dunning interpretation. Beale says the Dunning School broke new ground by escaping the political polemics of the day and used "meticulous and thorough research [...] in an effort to determine the truth rather than prove a thesis". Beale states that "The emphasis of the Dunning school was upon the harm done to the South by Radical Reconstruction and on the sordid political and economic motives behind Radicalism."

After 1950, the Dunning School was attacked by a new generation of historians. In keeping with European ideas about history "from the bottom up" and the agency of all classes of people, together with new research, they documented the place of African Americans at the center of Reconstruction. The revisionist view was expanded and revised by Foner and others. They castigated Dunning for his harsh treatment of Blacks in his Reconstruction (1907). However, Muller claimed that Dunning was equally harsh on all the major players: "Dunning's antipathy in Reconstruction is generously heaped on all groups, regardless of race, color, creed, or sectional origins."

== Works ==
- Irish Land Legislation Since 1845. (New York: Ginn, 1892)
- Essays on the Civil War and Reconstruction and Related Topics (1897, 2nd ed. 1904) online edition
- History of Political Theories, Ancient and Mediœval (3 vol., 1902–1920) vol 1 online; vol 2 online; vol 3 online
- History of Political Theories from Luther to Montesquieu (1905)
- Reconstruction, Political and Economic, 1865–1877 (1907) online edition
- A Sketch of Carl Schurz's Political Career, 1869–1906 (with Frederic Bancroft; 1908)
- Paying for Alaska (1912)
- The British Empire and the United States; a review of their relations during the century of peace following the treaty of Ghent, by William Archibald Dunning with an introduction by the Right Honourable Viscount Bryce, O.M., and a preface by Nicholas Murray Butler (New York: C. Scribner's Sons, 1914)
- Studies in Southern History and Politics (1914) online edition
- Books by William Archibald Dunning at Google Books
- A History of Political Theories from Rousseau to Spencer (New York: Johnson Reprint Corp., 1972)
