= Redeemers =

American political group

- Prominent members: Wade Hampton III; Benjamin Tillman; Alcibiades DeBlanc; Murphy J. Foster; Isham G. Harris; Lucius Quintus Cincinnatus Lamar
- Associated paramilitaries: Ku Klux Klan; White League; Red Shirts; Knights of the White Camelia
- Founded: 1865; 161 years ago
- Dissolved: 1877
- Preceded by: Southern Democrats
- Merged into: Southern Democrats; Solid South
- Ideology: Reactionism; Conservatism; White supremacy Anti-Reconstruction; Segregation
- Political position: Far-right
- Religion: Protestantism
- National affiliation: Democratic Party • Southern Democrats

The Redeemers were a political coalition in the Southern United States during the Reconstruction Era that followed the American Civil War. The Redeemers were the Southern wing of the Democratic Party. They sought to regain their political power and enforce white supremacy. Their policy of Redemption was intended to oust the Radical Republicans, a coalition of freedmen, "carpetbaggers", and "scalawags". The Redeemers were typically led by White yeomen and dominated Southern politics in most areas from the 1870s to 1910.

During Reconstruction, the South was under occupation by federal forces, and Southern state governments were dominated by Republicans, elected largely by freedmen and allies. Republicans nationally pressed for the granting of political rights to the newly freed slaves as the key to their becoming full citizens and the votes they would cast for the party. The Thirteenth Amendment (banning slavery), Fourteenth Amendment (guaranteeing the civil rights of former slaves and ensuring equal protection of the laws), and Fifteenth Amendment (prohibiting the denial of the right to vote on grounds of race, color, or previous condition of servitude), enshrined such political rights in the Constitution.

Numerous educated Blacks moved to the South to work for Reconstruction. Some were elected to office in the Southern states, or were appointed to positions. The Reconstruction governments were unpopular with many White Southerners, who were not willing to accept defeat and continued to try to prevent Black political activity by any means. The Ku Klux Klan used violence and intimidation against freedpeople and white Republicans. The organization drew members from across social classes, although its local chapters were often led by members of the white elite.

In the 1870s, paramilitary organizations, such as the White League in Louisiana and Red Shirts in Mississippi and North Carolina, undermined the Republicans, disrupting meetings and political gatherings. These paramilitary bands also used violence and threats of violence to undermine the Republican vote. By the presidential election of 1876, only three Southern states – Louisiana, South Carolina, and Florida – were "unredeemed," or not yet taken over by White Democrats. The disputed Presidential election between Rutherford B. Hayes (the Republican governor of Ohio) and Samuel J. Tilden (the Democratic governor of New York) was allegedly resolved by the Compromise of 1877, also known as the Corrupt Bargain or the Bargain of 1877. In this compromise, it was claimed, Hayes became president in exchange for numerous favors to the South, one of which was the removal of Federal troops from the remaining "unredeemed" Southern states; this was however a policy Hayes had endorsed during his campaign. With the removal of these forces, Reconstruction came to an end.

== History ==
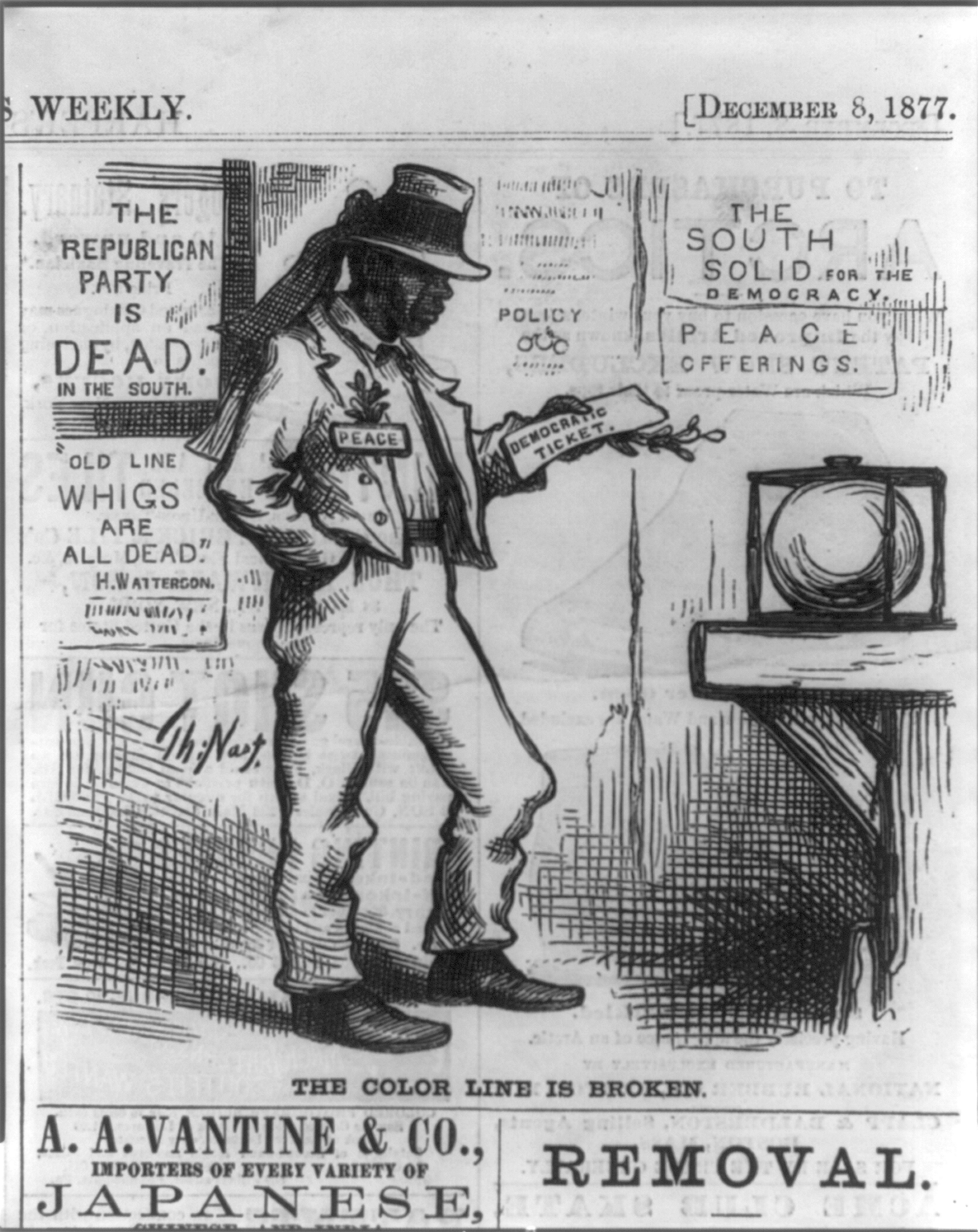
Political cartoon from 1877 by Thomas Nast portraying the Democratic Party's control of the South

In the 1870s, Democrats began to muster more political power, as former Confederate Whites began to vote again. It was a movement that gathered energy up until the Compromise of 1877, in the process known as the Redemption. White Democratic Southerners saw themselves as redeeming the South by regaining power.

More importantly, in a second wave of violence following the suppression of the Ku Klux Klan, violence began to increase in the Deep South. In 1868 white terrorists tried to prevent Republicans from winning the fall election in Louisiana. Over a few days, they killed some two hundred freedmen in St. Landry Parish in the Opelousas massacre. Other violence erupted. From April to October, there were 1,081 political murders in Louisiana, in which most of the victims were freedmen. Violence was part of campaigns prior to the election of 1872 in several states. In 1874 and 1875, more formal paramilitary groups affiliated with the Democratic Party conducted intimidation, terrorism and violence against Black voters and their allies to reduce Republican voting and turn officeholders out. These included the White League and Red Shirts. They worked openly for specific political ends, and often solicited coverage of their activities by the press. Every Southern election year from 1868 on was surrounded by intimidation and violence; they were usually marked by fraud as well.

In the aftermath of the disputed gubernatorial election of 1872 in Louisiana, for instance, the competing governors each certified slates of local officers. This situation contributed to the Colfax Massacre of 1873, in which White Democratic militia killed more than 100 Republican Blacks in a confrontation over control of parish offices. Three whites died in the violence.

In 1874 remnants of White militia formed the White League, a Democratic paramilitary group originating in Grant Parish of the Red River area of Louisiana, with chapters arising across the state, especially in rural areas. In August the White League turned out six Republican office holders in Coushatta, Louisiana, and told them to leave the state. Before they could make their way, they and five to twenty Black witnesses were assassinated by White paramilitary. In September, thousands of armed White militia, supporters of the Democratic gubernatorial candidate John McEnery, fought against New Orleans police and state militia in what was called the Battle of Liberty Place. They took over the state government offices in New Orleans and occupied the capitol and armory. They turned Republican governor William Pitt Kellogg out of office, and retreated only in the face of the arrival of Federal troops sent by President Ulysses S. Grant.

Similarly, in Mississippi, the Red Shirts formed as a prominent paramilitary group that enforced Democratic voting by intimidation and murder. Chapters of paramilitary Red Shirts arose and were active in North Carolina and South Carolina as well. They disrupted Republican meetings, killed leaders and officeholders, intimidated voters at the polls, or kept them away altogether.

The Redeemers' program emphasized opposition to the Republican governments, which they considered to be corrupt and a violation of true republican principles. The crippling national economic problems and reliance on cotton meant that the South was struggling financially. Redeemers denounced taxes higher than what they had known before the war. At that time, however, the states had few functions, and planters maintained private institutions only. Redeemers wanted to reduce state debts. Once in power, they typically cut government spending; shortened legislative sessions; lowered politicians' salaries; scaled back public aid to railroads and corporations; and reduced support for the new systems of public education and some welfare institutions.

As Democrats took over state legislatures, they worked to change voter registration rules to strip most Blacks (and many poor Whites) of their ability to vote. Blacks continued to vote in significant numbers well into the 1880s, with many winning local offices. Black Congressmen continued to be elected, albeit in ever smaller numbers, until the 1890s. George Henry White, the last Southern Black of the post-Reconstruction period to serve in Congress, retired in 1901, leaving Congress completely White until 1929.

In the 1890s, William Jennings Bryan defeated the Southern Bourbon Democrats and took control of the Democratic Party nationwide. The Democrats also faced challenges with the Agrarian Revolt, when their control of the South was threatened by the Farmers Alliance, the effects of Bimetallism, and the newly created People's Party.

=== Disenfranchising ===
Democrats worked hard to prevent populist coalitions. In the former Confederate South, from 1890 to 1908, starting with Mississippi, legislatures of ten of the eleven states passed disenfranchising constitutions, which had new provisions for poll taxes, literacy tests, residency requirements and other devices that effectively disenfranchised nearly all Blacks and tens of thousands of poor Whites. Hundreds of thousands of people were removed from voter registration rolls soon after these provisions were implemented.

In Alabama, for instance, in 1900, 14 Black Belt counties had a total of 79,311 voters on the rolls; by June 1, 1903, after the new constitution was passed, registration had dropped to just 1,081. Statewide Alabama in 1900 had 181,315 Blacks eligible to vote, but by 1903 only 2,980 were registered, although at least 74,000 were literate. From 1900 to 1903, the number of White registered voters fell by more than 40,000, although the White population grew overall.

By 1941, more poor Whites than Blacks had been disenfranchised in Alabama, mostly due to effects of the cumulative poll tax; estimates were that 600,000 Whites and 500,000 Blacks had been disenfranchised.

In addition to being disenfranchised, African Americans and poor Whites were shut out of the political process as Southern legislatures passed Jim Crow laws imposing segregation in public facilities and places. The discrimination, segregation, and disenfranchisement lasted well into the later decades of the 20th century. Those who could not vote were also ineligible to run for office or serve on juries, so they were shut out of all offices at the local and state as well as federal levels.

Congress actively intervened for more than 20 years in elections in the South, which the House Elections Committee judged to be flawed. After 1896, Congress backed off from intervening. Many Northern legislators were outraged about the disenfranchisement of Blacks and some proposed reducing Southern representation in Congress, but they never managed to accomplish this, as Southern representatives formed a strong one-party voting bloc for decades.

Although educated African Americans mounted legal challenges (with many secretly funded by educator Booker T. Washington and his northern allies), the Supreme Court upheld Mississippi's and Alabama's provisions in its rulings in Williams v. Mississippi (1898) and Giles v. Harris (1903).

=== Religious dimension ===
People in the movement chose the term Redemption from Christian theology. Historian Daniel W. Stowell concludes that White Southerners appropriated the term to describe the political transformation they desired, that is, the end of Reconstruction. This term helped unify numerous White voters, and encompassed efforts to purge southern society of its sins and to remove Republican political leaders.

It also represented the birth of a new Southern society, rather than a return to its prewar predecessor. Historian Gaines M. Foster explains how the South became known as the "Bible Belt" by connecting this characterization with changing attitudes caused by slavery's demise. Freed from preoccupation with federal intervention over slavery, and even citing it as precedent, White Southerners joined Northerners in the national crusade to legislate morality. Viewed by some as a "bulwark of morality", the largely Protestant South took on a Bible Belt identity long before H. L. Mencken coined the term.

== The "redeemed" South ==
When Reconstruction died, so did all hope for national enforcement of adherence to the constitutional amendments that the U.S. Congress had passed in the wake of the Civil War. As the last Federal troops left the ex-Confederacy, two old foes of American politics reappeared at the heart of the Southern polity – the twin, inflammatory issues of state rights and race. It was precisely on the ground of these two issues that the Civil War had broken out, and in 1877, sixteen years after the secession crisis, the South reaffirmed control over them.

"The slave went free; stood a brief moment in the sun; then moved back again toward slavery", wrote W. E. B. Du Bois. The Black community in the South was brought back under the yoke of the Southern Democrats, who had been politically undermined during Reconstruction. Whites in the South were committed to reestablish its own sociopolitical structure with the goal of a new social order enforcing racial subordination and labor control. While the Republicans succeeded in maintaining some power in part of the Upper South, such as Tennessee and East Kentucky, in the Deep South there was a return to "home rule". Nowhere was this more true than Georgia, where an unbroken line of Democrats occupied the governor's office for 131 years, a period of dominance that only came to an end in 2003.

In the aftermath of the Compromise of 1877, Southern Democrats held the South's Black community under increasingly tight control. Politically, Blacks were gradually evicted from public office, as the few that remained saw the sway they held over local politics considerably decreased. Socially, the situation was worse, as the Southern Democrats tightened their grip on the labor force. Vagrancy and "anti-enticement" laws were reinstituted. It became illegal to be jobless, or to leave a job before the required contract expired. Economically, Blacks were stripped of independence, as new laws gave White planters control over credit lines and property. Effectively, the Black community was placed under a three-fold subjugation that was reminiscent of slavery.

Also, historian Edward L. Ayers argues that after 1877 the Redeemers were sharply divided and fought for control of the Democratic Party:

For the next few years the Democrats seemed in control of the South, but even then deep challenges were building beneath the surface. Behind their show of unity, the Democratic Redeemers suffered deep divisions. Conflicts between upcountry and Black Belt, between town and country, and between former Democrats and former Whigs divided the Redeemers. The Democratic party proved too small to contain the ambitions of all the White men who sought its rewards, too large and unwieldy to move decisively.

== Historiography ==
In the years immediately following Reconstruction, most Blacks and former abolitionists held that Reconstruction lost the struggle for civil rights for Black people because of violence against Blacks and against White Republicans. Frederick Douglass and Reconstruction Congressman John R. Lynch cited the withdrawal of federal troops from the South as a primary reason for the loss of voting rights and other civil rights by African Americans after 1877.

By the turn of the 20th century, White historians, led by the Dunning School, described Reconstruction as a failure because of what they characterized as its political and financial corruption, its failure to heal the hatreds of the war, and its control by self-serving Northern politicians, such as those around President Grant. Historian Claude Bowers said that the worst part of what he called "the Tragic Era" was the extension of voting rights to freedmen, a policy he claimed led to misgovernment and corruption. The Dunning School historians argued that the freedmen were manipulated by corrupt White carpetbaggers interested only in raiding the state treasury and staying in power. They claimed that the South had to be "redeemed" by foes of corruption. Reconstruction, in short, was said to violate the values of "republicanism" and all Republicans were classified as "extremists". This interpretation of events, the hallmark of the Dunning School, dominated most U.S. history textbooks from 1900 to the 1960s.

Beginning in the 1930s, historians such as C. Vann Woodward and Howard K. Beale attacked the "redemptionist" interpretation of Reconstruction, calling themselves "revisionists" and claiming that the real issues were economic. The Northern Radicals were tools of the railroads, and the Republicans in the South were manipulated to do their bidding. The Redeemers, furthermore, were also tools of the railroads and were themselves corrupt.

In 1935, W. E. B. Du Bois published a Marxist analysis in his Black Reconstruction: An Essay toward a History of the Part which Black Folk Played in the Attempt to Reconstruct Democracy in America, 1860–1880. His book emphasized the role of African Americans during Reconstruction, noted their collaboration with Whites, their lack of majority in most legislatures, and also the achievements of Reconstruction: establishing universal public education, improving prisons, establishing orphanages and other charitable institutions, and trying to improve state funding for the welfare of all citizens. He also noted that despite complaints, most Southern states kept the constitutions of Reconstruction for many years, some for a quarter of a century.

By the 1960s, neo-abolitionist historians led by Kenneth Stampp and Eric Foner focused on the struggle of freedmen. While acknowledging corruption in the Reconstruction era, they hold that the Dunning School overemphasized it while ignoring the worst violations of republican principles — namely denying African Americans their civil rights, including their right to vote.

== Supreme Court challenges ==
Although African Americans mounted legal challenges, the U.S. Supreme Court upheld Mississippi's and Alabama's provisions in its rulings in Williams v. Mississippi (1898), Giles v. Harris (1903), and Giles v. Teasley (1904). Booker T. Washington secretly helped fund and arrange representation for such legal challenges, raising money from northern patrons who helped support Tuskegee University.

When White primaries were ruled unconstitutional by the Supreme Court in Smith v. Allwright (1944), civil rights organizations rushed to register African-American voters. By 1947 the All-Citizens Registration Committee (ACRC) of Atlanta managed to get 125,000 voters registered in Georgia, raising black participation to 18.8% of those eligible. This was a major increase from the 20,000 on the rolls who had managed to get through administrative barriers in 1940.

However, Georgia, among other Southern states, passed new legislation (1958) to once again repress Black voter registration. It was not until the passage of the Civil Rights Act of 1957, the Civil Rights Act of 1964, and the Voting Rights Act of 1965 that the descendants of those who were first granted suffrage by the Fifteenth Amendment finally regained the ability to vote.

== See also ==
- Jim Crow laws
- Disenfranchisement after the Reconstruction Era
- Nadir of American race relations
- Phoenix Election Riot, in South Carolina
- White backlash
- Dixiecrat
