= Charles Ramsdell =

Charles Ramsdell may refer to:

- Charles Ramsdell (basketball) (born 1985), Malagasy basketball player
- Charles W. Ramsdell (1877–1942), American historian
