= William K. Scarborough =

Professor of history

- Born: January 17, 1933; Baltimore, Maryland
- Died: May 17, 2020 (aged 87); Hattiesburg, Mississippi
- Known for: Massive Resistance
- Spouse: Patricia Carruthers Scarborough

Academic background
- Education: University of North Carolina (B.A 1954); Cornell University (MA); University of North Carolina (PhD 1962)

Academic work
- Discipline: History
- Sub-discipline: American South
- Institutions: University of Southern Mississippi 1964-2009

William Kauffman Scarborough (January 17, 1933 - May 17, 2020) was a professor emeritus of history at the University of Southern Mississippi. He was the Charles W. Moorman Distinguished Alumni Professor in the Humanities from 1996 to 1998.

He was an outspoken opponent of school integration and supporter of massive resistance, believing white people to be the "superior race" and black people to be "genetically inferior." He was a member of the Citizens' Councils.

Scarborough was a featured interviewee in the Stanley Nelson Jr. film Freedom Summer. Scarborough spoke at the Citadel on the subject of the secession of South Carolina.

== Personal ==
Scarborough was born in Baltimore, Maryland to James Blaine Scarborough and Julia Irene Scarborough (née Kauffman). His mother, a nurse, served with the American Expeditionary Force in France during World War I. His father earned a Ph.D. in mathematics at Johns Hopkins University in 1923 and served for three decades as a professor at the United States Naval Academy in Annapolis, Maryland. The elder Scarborough published Numerical Mathematical Analysis (1930), a book considered fundamental to the development of computers in the 1940s.

Scarborough earned his B.A at the University of North Carolina at Chapel Hill in 1954, and soon after, he married Patricia Estelle Carruthers. Together, they had two children. Having received an officer's commission via the Navy ROTC, he served from 1954 to 1956 as a gunnery officer on the USS New Jersey (BB-62). He earned his M.A. at Cornell and completed his doctorate under Fletcher Melvin Green at the University of North Carolina, Chapel Hill in 1962.

Between 1961 and 1963, he taught at Millsaps College in Jackson, Mississippi. Because he stridently supported Governor Ross Barnett and vocally criticized administrators at the college, the college chose not to renew his employment contract. Beginning in Fall 1963, he taught for a year at Northeast Louisiana University before accepting an appointment the following Fall at Southern Miss where he remained until his retirement.

The records of his work, 27 feet and 8500 documents, including materials associated with the Citizens' Councils, are archived at the University of North Carolina libraries.

Scarborough died in May 2020.

== Selected publications ==
- Overseer: Plantation Management in the Old South
- Diary of Edmund Ruffin: Days of Independence, October 1856 - April 1861
- Diary of Edmund Ruffin: The Days of Hope, April 1861 - June 1863
- Diary of Edmund Ruffin: A Dream Shattered, June 1863 - June 1865
- Masters of the Big House: Elite Slaveholders of the Mid-Nineteenth-Century South
- The Allstons of Chicora Wood: Wealth, Honor, and Gentility in the South Carolina Lowcountry
- "Slavery — The White Man's Burden"
- "Heritage, not hate. Let's keep the state flag"
