= Black Reconstruction in America =

1935 book by W. E. B. Du Bois

Black Reconstruction in America: An Essay Toward a History of the Part Which Black Folk Played in the Attempt to Reconstruct Democracy in America, 1860–1880
- First edition
- Author: W. E. B. Du Bois
- Language: English
- Subject: Reconstruction Era
- Genre: Non-fiction
- Publisher: Harcourt, Brace and Company
- Publication date: 1935
- Publication place: United States
- Media type: Print
- Website: archive.org/details/blackreconstruct00dubo/page/n3/mode/2up

Black Reconstruction in America: An Essay Toward a History of the Part Which Black Folk Played in the Attempt to Reconstruct Democracy in America, 1860–1880 is a history of the Reconstruction era by W. E. B. Du Bois, first published in 1935. The book challenged the standard academic view of Reconstruction at the time, the Dunning School, which contended that the period was a failure and downplayed the contributions of African Americans. Du Bois instead emphasized the agency of Black people and freed slaves during the Civil War and Reconstruction and framed the period as one that held promise for a worker-ruled democracy to replace a slavery-based plantation economy.

== Context and inception ==
Du Bois' first published writing on Reconstruction was a 1901 Atlantic Monthly essay entitled "The Freedmen's Bureau", which was reprinted as the essay "Of the Dawn of Freedom" in his 1903 book The Souls of Black Folk. He also wrote about Reconstruction in his 1924 book The Gift of Black Folk. He wrote a more extensive essay on the topic entitled "Reconstruction and Its Benefits", which was first delivered to the American Historical Association in December 1909 in New York City. Albert Bushnell Hart, one of his former professors at Harvard University, sent him money to attend the conference. William Archibald Dunning, leader of what was called the Dunning School that developed at Columbia University, heard Du Bois' presentation and praised his paper, according to Du Bois. The essay was published in the July 1910 issue of The American Historical Review, but had little influence at the time.

The academic consensus at this time portrayed black enfranchisement and Reconstruction governments in the south as a failure. A view had collected around James Pike's work, The Prostrate State (1878), written shortly after Reconstruction ended. He contended there were no benefits from Reconstruction. Woodrow Wilson's Division and Reunion, 1829–1889 (1893), and James Ford Rhodes' History of the United States from the Compromise of 1850 (1906) denigrated African-American contributions during that period, reflecting attitudes of white supremacy in a period when most blacks and many poor whites had been disenfranchised across the South. James Wilford Garner's Reconstruction in Mississippi (1901), Walter L. Fleming's Civil War and Reconstruction in Alabama (1905), Thomas Staples' Reconstruction in Arkansas, 1862–1874 (1923), and Charles William Ramsdell's Reconstruction in Texas (1910) were works by Dunning followers, most of whom had positions in history at Southern universities.

After the publication of Claude Bowers' The Tragic Era: The Revolution after Lincoln, which promoted the Dunning school view, in 1929, Anna Julia Cooper wrote to Du Bois and asked him to write a response. In 1931, Du Bois received funding to the Julius Rosenwald Fund funding for two books, including one on Reconstruction. In 1931, he wrote to Alfred Harcourt—whose publishing firm Harcourt, Brace and Howe would later publish the book—outlining the theses of what would become Black Reconstruction.

== Summary ==
After three short chapters profiling the black worker, the white worker, and the planter, Du Bois argues in the fourth chapter that the decision gradually taken by slaves on the Southern plantations to stop working during the war was an example of a potential general strike force of four million slaves the Southern elite had not reckoned with. The institution of slavery simply had to soften: "In a certain sense, after the first few months everybody knew that slavery was done with; that no matter who won, the condition of the slave could never be the same after this disaster of war."

Du Bois' research shows that the post-emancipation South did not degenerate into economic or political chaos. State by state in subsequent chapters, he notes the efforts of the elite planter class to retain control and recover property (land, in particular) lost during the war. This, in the ever-present context of violence committed by paramilitary groups, often from the former poor-white overseer class, all throughout the South. These groups often used terror to repress black organization and suffrage, frightened by the immense power that 4 million voters would have on the shape of the future.

He documents the creation of public health departments to promote public health and sanitation, and to combat the spread of epidemics during the Reconstruction period. Against the claim that the Radical Republicans had done a poor job at the constitutional conventions and during the first decade of Reconstruction, Du Bois observes that after the Democrats regained power in 1876, they did not change the Reconstruction constitutions for nearly a quarter century. When the Democrats did pass laws to impose racial segregation and Jim Crow, they maintained some support of public education, public health and welfare laws, along with the constitutional principles that benefited the citizens as a whole.

Du Bois noted that the Southern working class, i.e. black freedmen and poor whites, were divided after the Civil War along the lines of race, and did not unite against the white propertied class, i.e. the former planters. He believed this failure enabled the white Democrats to regain control of state legislatures, pass Jim Crow laws, and disfranchise most blacks and many poor whites in the late 19th and early 20th centuries.

Du Bois' extensive use of data and primary source material on the postwar political economy of the former Confederate States is notable, as is the literary style of this 750-page essay. He notes major achievements, such as establishing public education in the South for the first time, the founding of charitable institutions to care for all citizens, the extension of the vote to the landless whites, and investment in public infrastructure.

== Key concepts and arguments ==
=== General strike of slaves ===
In the fourth chapter of Black Reconstruction, entitled "The General Strike", Du Bois makes the argument that after the war escalated, slaves in the Confederate states engaged in a general strike wherein they stopped work and sought to cross enemy lines. He identifies this as a crucial turning point in the war, and an important cause in several outcomes: economic crisis in the Confederacy, a supply of laborers and soldiers for the Union Army, and a signal that countered slaveholder propaganda that slaves were satisfied with their conditions. This was a key part of Du Bois' argument about the agency of African Americans during the Civil War, and has recently been re-emphasized in recent work by scholars such as Gayatri Spivak, David Roediger, Erik Loomis, Guy Emerson Mount, Alys Eve Weinbaum, and Joshua Clover.

=== Public and psychological wage for white workers ===
In the section on the post-Civil War south, Du Bois argues that white workers gained a "public and psychological wage" from racism, which prevented a coalition between white and black workers. He used this term to distinguish it from a material wage. He defined the concept as follows:

It must be remembered that the white group of laborers, while they received a low wage, were compensated in part by a sort of public and psychological wage. They were given public deference and titles of courtesy because they were white. They were admitted freely with all classes of white people to public functions, public parks, and the best schools. The police were drawn from their ranks, and the courts, dependent upon their votes, treated them with such leniency as to encourage lawlessness. Their vote selected public officials, and while this had small effect upon the economic situation, it had great effect upon their personal treatment and the deference shown them. White schoolhouses were the best in the community, and conspicuously placed, and they cost anywhere from twice to ten times as much per capita as the colored schools. The newspapers specialized on news that flattered the poor whites and almost utterly ignored the Negro except in crime and ridicule.

Du Bois' analysis of white identity as constructed and the concept of the psychological wage were major influences in the field of whiteness studies. A key text in that literature, The Wages of Whiteness by David Roediger, takes its title directly from Du Bois' concept.

== Critical reception and legacy ==
Black Reconstruction received positive reviews in Kirkus Reviews and The New York Times soon after its publication. However, the work was largely ignored by historians upon publication, when the views of the Dunning School associated with Columbia University prevailed in published histories of Reconstruction. Some critics rejected Du Bois' critique of other historians writing about the freedmen's role during Reconstruction. Du Bois lists a number of books and writers that he believed misrepresented the Reconstruction period. He identified those he believed were particularly racist or ill-informed works. Du Bois thought that certain historians were maintaining the "southern white fairytale" instead of accurately chronicling the events and key figures of Reconstruction.

In the 1960s and through the next decades, a new generation of historians began to re-evaluate Du Bois' work, as well as works of other African American historians. They developed new research and came to conclusions that revised the historiography of Reconstruction. This work emphasized black people's agency in their search for freedom and the era's radical policy changes that began to provide for general welfare, rather than the interests of the wealthy planter class.

Scholarship in the 1970s and 1980s tempered some of these claims by highlighting continuities in the political goals of white politicians before and during Reconstruction. Du Bois' emphasis on the revolutionary character of Reconstruction was affirmed by Eric Foner's landmark book, Reconstruction: America's Unfinished Revolution, 1863–1877. In that book, Foner called Black Reconstruction "a monumental study" that "anticipated the findings of modern scholarship". By the early twenty-first century, Du Bois' Black Reconstruction was widely perceived as "the foundational text of revisionist African American historiography."

W. E. B. Du Bois’s analysis of Black labor in Black Reconstruction in America significantly influenced how scholars understand the relationship between race and economic systems. Du Bois argued that Black labor was central to the development of American capitalism, rather than being excluded from it. He also introduced the concept of the “wages of whiteness,” which described how white workers received social and psychological benefits that reinforced racial divisions within the working class. This division prevented collective resistance and helped maintain systems of economic inequality. Du Bois’s work challenged traditional economic interpretations that treated markets as neutral, instead emphasizing the role of historical and structural factors in shaping inequality. His ideas have contributed to later theories such as racial capitalism and continue to influence research in sociology, economics, and African American studies. Today, his analysis remains relevant for understanding persistent racial disparities in wealth and labor outcomes.
