= Southern Historical Collection =

Coordinates: 35°54′34.69″N 79°2′59.38″W

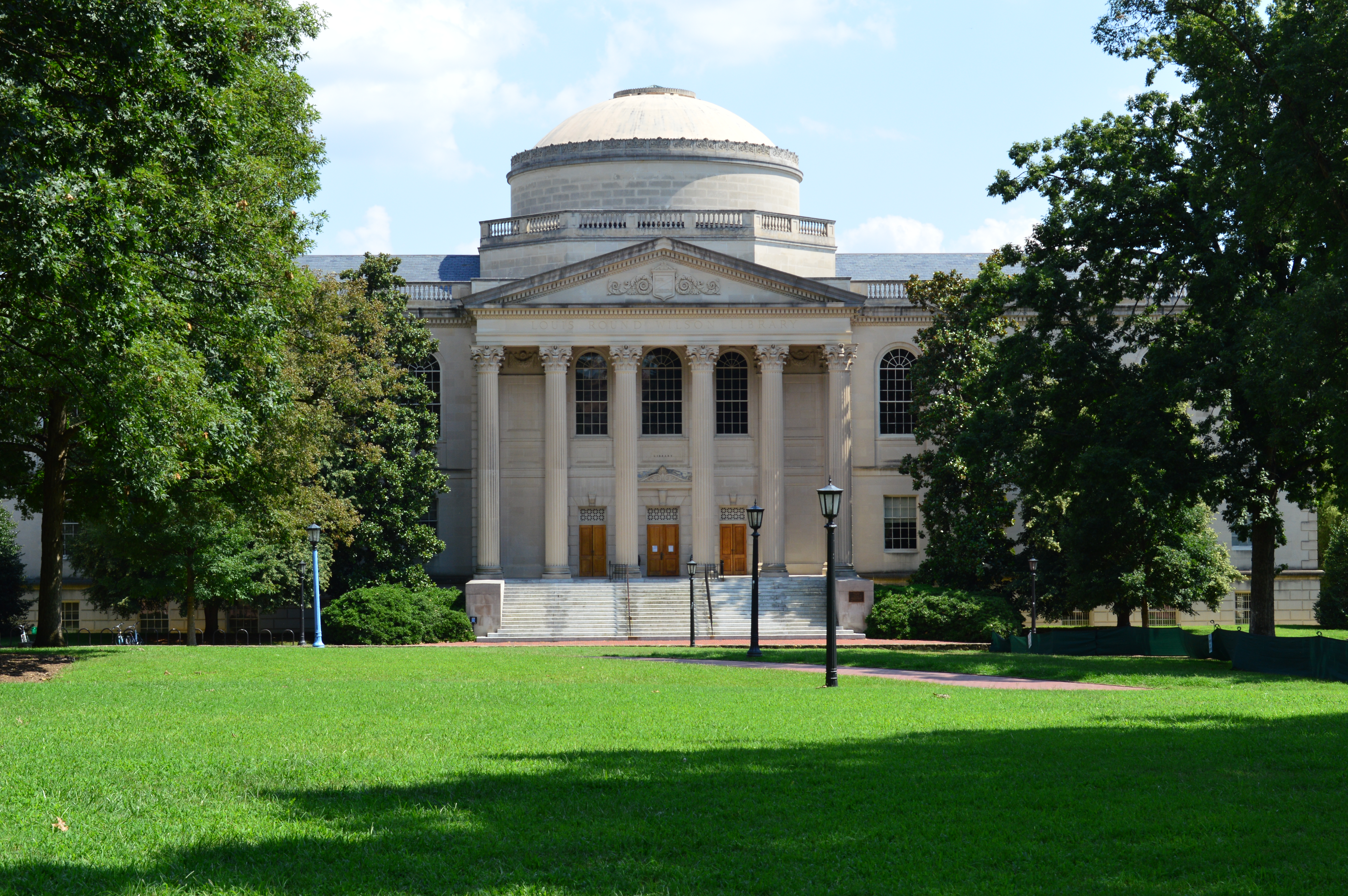
Wilson Library, location of the Southern Historical Collection

The Southern Historical Collection is a repository of distinct archival collections at the University of North Carolina at Chapel Hill which document the culture and history of the American South. These collections are made up of unique primary materials, such as manuscripts, letters, photographs, diaries, drawings, scrapbooks, journals, oral histories, maps, ledgers, moving images, literary manuscripts, albums, and other materials.

== History ==
The North Carolina Historical Society began collecting manuscripts at the University of North Carolina at Chapel Hill in 1844. The collecting stopped in the early twentieth century when the Society ceased operation.

The holdings were then transferred to the University Library. By the 1920s, Dr. J. G. de Roulhac Hamilton, a professor of history was corresponding about the idea of creating "a great library of Southern human records." Hamilton began traveling the South, in his "faithful Fords," seeking out and gathering materials. He appointed his assistant, Elizabeth Brownrigg Henderson Cotten, as the collection's first curator. She obtained thousands of works for the collection.

On January 14, 1930, the Southern Historical Collection was officially established. Dr. Hamilton served as director, and the initial endowment was offered by Sarah Graham Kenan. Upon Hamilton's 1951 retirement, the Southern Historical Collection held roughly 2,140,000 manuscript items.

== The collection today ==
The Southern Historical Collection now holds more than 15 million items, which are organized into over 4,600 discrete collections. The collection can be found in Wilson Library on the campus of the University of North Carolina at Chapel Hill. Materials are available for on-site research, but are non-circulating due to rarity and fragility.

The collections held in the Southern Historical Collection are described in online and print finding aids, which contain information on the history or background of the entity (person, family, or organization) that created the collection, as well as a description or list of most of the materials in the collection itself.

Some of the subject strengths of the collection include:

- Social activism
- Communities
- Labor
- Civil rights
- Slavery
- Journalism
- Family

Time periods chiefly represented in the SHC include:

- Antebellum plantation era
- American Civil War
- Reconstruction
- The New South
- The Jim Crow South
- The South since 1954
