= C. Mildred Thompson =

American educator (1881–1975)

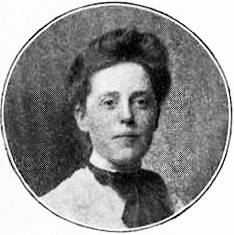
- Portrait of Clara Mildred Thompson.
- Born: November 27, 1881; Atlanta, Georgia
- Died: February 17, 1975; Atlanta, Georgia

Academic background
- Education: Vassar College (A.B.); Columbia University (M.A. and Ph.D.)
- Academic advisor: William Archibald Dunning

Academic work
- Discipline: History

Clara Mildred Thompson (27 November 1881 – 17 February 1975) was a prominent historian and dean of Vassar College where she also chaired its history department. She is the author of two studies about southern Reconstruction and taught history at the University of Georgia from 1948 to 1952. Thompson was also active in the political campaign of Franklin D. Roosevelt and worked as an educational delegate to Europe and the United Nations.

== Early life and education ==
Clara Mildred Thompson was born on November 27, 1881, in Atlanta, Georgia to Robert and Alice Thompson. Thompson attended public schools until high school where she attended an all Girls' High School. She was influenced to apply to Vassar College by the Vassar College women she met. In 1899, She was enrolled in Vassar College and graduated in 1903.

Thompson entered Columbia University in 1906. There she was a student under Reconstruction scholar William Archibald Dunning, becoming conspicuously the only woman member of the scholars known as the "Dunning men"; she was notable within the group for her comparatively moderate views. Thompson earned her master's degree in 1907 and her Ph.D. in 1915 from Columbia University.

== Career ==
Thompson began working in 1903 as an English and History teacher at the Wilford School, a private school, in Baltimore, Maryland. She would join Vassar's History department in 1908 as a substitute teacher. Thompson was able to grow into an assistant professor in 1915, then associate professor in 1917. In 1923, Thompson became the second dean for Vassar College. As a dean, she decided to focus on student's mental health. She was able to give the Vassar student body access to their first consultant psychiatrist. Which they held in her office. Thompson became the person to live in the Dean's House built by Ruth Adams in 1932. In 1940 a scholarship from one of the seven 75th anniversary scholarships was named after Thompson because of her impact on Vassar. Once she retired forming being a dean in 1948, after 25 years she still worked with the education industry. For four more years, she works as a consultant in education and a history professor at the University of Georgia. For an additional year, Thompson work as the dean of women at Free Europe University in Exile, an American-run university for young people from Soviet-bloc countries.

== Publications ==
Thompson contributed to Studies in Southern History and Politics Inscribed to William Archibald Dunning . . . by His Former Pupils the Authors (1914), the only woman to publish in the Dunning School of Reconstruction historiography's studies of seven southern states. She later published Reconstruction in Georgia: Economic, Social, Political: 1865-1872 (1915), considered one of the series' strongest titles. One contemporaneous critic called the study an "interesting and comprehensive volume".

== Politics ==
Mildred Thompson was known for her political involvement, like supporting women's rights by participating in the women's suffrage parade in New York with Lucy Maynard Salmon in 1911. As she was a close friend to Eleanor Roosevelt, Thompson was active in politics during the Franklin D. Roosevelt administration. She was the chairman of the woman's division of the Democratic National Committee and head of the educator's committee during FDR's 1936 campaign for re-election. Thompson campaigned for Roosevelt in the years 1936, 1940, and 1944.

In 1944, Thompson was appointed by the state department as the only woman representative to help represent CAME or Conference of Allied Ministers of Education in London, working with Commissioner of Education, John W. Studebaker, and Representative J. William Fulbright of Arkansas.

== Personal life and death ==
Thompson was also known for speaking on a popular radio program Information, Please! along with hosting her radio program Listen, the Women.

Thompson died on February 17, 1975, at the age of 93.

== Works cited ==
- Bragg, William Harris (December 20, 2005). "C. Mildred Thompson (1881-1975)". New Georgia Encyclopedia.
- "Educators Aid Roosevelt: Four Women's College Heads and Others Join Drive". The New York Times. October 15, 1936. p. 21.
- Frank, Daniel (March 18, 1963). "She Found Teaching Is Friendship". Atlanta Journal.
- Johnson, Colton (2012). "C. Mildred Thompson". Vassar College Encyclopedia. Vassar College.
- McPherson, J. H. T. (October 1915). "Review of Reconstruction in Georgia, Economic, Social, Political, 1865-1872 by C. Mildred Thompson". The American Historical Review. 21 (1): 162–164. doi:10.2307/1836722. hdl:2027/coo.31924028791818. JSTOR 1836722.
- "Mildred Thompson, Historian, Vassar Dean Emeritus, Is Dead". The New York Times. February 17, 1975. p. 24.
- Smith, John David (2013). The Dunning School: Historians, Race, and the Meaning of Reconstruction. University Press of Kentucky. ISBN 978-0813142722.
