= E. Merton Coulter =

American historian (1890–1981)

Ellis Merton Coulter (July 20, 1890, in Catawba, North Carolina–1981) was an American historian of the South, author, and a founding member of the Southern Historical Association. For four decades, he was a professor at the University of Georgia in Athens, Georgia, where he was chair of the History Department for 18 years. He was editor of the Georgia Historical Quarterly for 50 years, and published 26 books on the American Civil War and Reconstruction.

By the late 20th century, historians were generally describing Coulter's body of work as "historical apologies justifying Southern secession, defending the Confederate cause, and condemning Reconstruction." As historian Eric Foner notes:

Anti-Reconstruction scholars faithfully echoed Democratic propaganda of the post-Civil War years. E. Merton Coulter wrote in 1947, "The Negroes were fearfully unprepared to occupy positions of rulership," and black officeholding was "the most spectacular and exotic development in government in the history of white civilization...(and the) longest to be remembered, shuddered at, and execrated."

Foner also wrote that as late as 1968, Coulter was "the last wholly antagonistic scholar of the era, describing Georgia's most prominent Reconstruction black officials as swindlers and 'scamps' and suggesting that whatever positive qualities they possessed were inherited from white ancestors."

== Background and early life ==
Coulter was the son of the moderately wealthy John Ellis Coulter, a merchant and land speculator in the small town of Connelly Springs, North Carolina, in the western Piedmont. His father had hoped his son would go into the Lutheran ministry, but Coulter chose history instead.

Both of Coulter's grandfathers served in the Confederate States Army. One fell in the Civil War while the other was a POW. During Reconstruction he was indicted for Ku Klux Klan-related violence and acquitted by an all-white jury.

Coulter earned his undergraduate degree at the University of North Carolina (UNC), mentored by J. G. de Roulhac Hamilton, a prominent historian who emphasized how Southern whites had suffered under Reconstruction and the lack of readiness of freedmen and blacks for suffrage. In 1914 Coulter entered the University of Wisconsin–Madison for graduate doctoral work, where he studied under additional professors sympathetic to Southern thinking about the Civil War and Reconstruction.

== Professional career ==
After teaching briefly at Marietta College in Ohio, Coulter was hired by Georgia's flagship University of Georgia, where he was a professor for six decades. In 1940 he was selected as chair of the History Department, a position he held for 18 years. As a professor and writer, he influenced generations of historians.

In addition, Coulter was editor of the Georgia Historical Quarterly for 50 years. A founding member of the Southern Historical Association, he served as its first president in 1934. In both writing and teaching, he was influential. The Library of Congress lists 50 books written or edited by Dr. Coulter. He published more than 125 articles, and wrote what for decades was the standard textbook for Georgia history. Coulter published books, often on forgotten and obscure people in Georgia history whose careers represented much about the state's development, such as his biographies of George Walton Williams, James Monroe Smith, Daniel Lee, Thomas Spalding, and many others. Similarly, works that he did on the now dead towns of Auraria and Petersburg discovers historical context within community. His work in professionally documenting historical truth behind local legend illustrated the scholarly value of legend shown in his work The Toombs Oak, the Tree that Owned Itself, and other Chapters of Georgia (1966).

According to the New Georgia Encyclopedia, "Coulter emerged as a leader of that generation of white southern historians who viewed the South's past with pride and defended its racist policies and practices. He framed his literary corpus to praise the Old South, glorify Confederate heroes, vilify northerners, and denigrate southern blacks."

== Reassessment ==
In the late 20th century, historians described Coulter's books as "historical apologies justifying Southern secession, defending the Confederate cause, and condemning Reconstruction." In this, he had absorbed ideas of his professor J. G. de Roulhac Hamilton at UNC, as well as views commonly shared by whites in the South. In the mid-20th century, people used Coulter's "intellectual paradigm" about Southern black failures as justification for maintaining Jim Crow segregation and opposing civil rights reform.

== Books ==
- The Civil War and Readjustment in Kentucky (1926)
- College Life in the Old South (1928, 1951)
- A Short History of Georgia (1933, 1947, and 1960)
- William G. Brownlow: Fighting Parson of the Southern Highlands (1939)
- The South During Reconstruction (1947)
- Confederate States of America (1952)
- History of Georgia (1954), a junior high school textbook
- Auraria: The Story of a Georgia Gold-Mining Town (1956)
