= W. Fitzhugh Brundage =

American historian

- Born: 1959 (age 66–67)
- Education: University of Chicago; Harvard University
- Occupation: Historian
- Employer: University of North Carolina at Chapel Hill

William Fitzhugh Brundage is an American historian and the William Umstead Distinguished Professor at the University of North Carolina. His works focus on white and black historical memory in the American South since the Civil War.

== Early life ==
Brundage graduated from the University of Chicago with an MA in 1984, and from Harvard University with an MA and Ph.D. in 1988.

== Career ==
Brundage taught at Queen's University at Kingston, and University of Florida. He teaches at the University of North Carolina at Chapel Hill, where he is the William Umstead Distinguished Professor in the History department.

Brundage is the author and editor of a number of books. He won the Merle Curti Award from the Organization of American Historians in 1994 for Lynching in the New South: Georgia and Virginia, 1880–1930.

He is a Guggenheim Fellow.

His 2026 book A Fate Worse than Hell: American Prisoners of the Civil War describes the usage of prison camps for captured enemy soldiers during the American Civil War. It has been described as the first comprehensive study of those prison camps since William B. Hesseltine's 1930 book Civil War Prisons.

In A Fate Worse than Hell, Brundage writes that prisoners of war were incarcerated at unprecedented rates, made possible by technological advancements such as railroads. The Union and Confederacy both did little to provide for the welfare of their prisoners, he argues, but the Confederacy was substantially more neglectful, and their death rates were higher: 16% for Union soldiers in Confederate camps versus 12% for Confederate soldiers in Union camps.

== Works ==
- Lynching in the New South: Georgia and Virginia, 1880-1930. University of Illinois Press. 1993. ISBN 978-0-252-06345-9.
- A Socialist Utopia in the New South: the Ruskin Colonies in Tennessee and Georgia, 1894-1901. University of Illinois Press. 1996. ISBN 978-0-252-06548-4.
- Under Sentence of Death: Lynching in the South. UNC Press Books. 1997. ISBN 978-0-8078-4636-0.
- Where These Memories Grow: History, Memory, and Southern Identity. UNC Press Books. 2000. ISBN 978-0-8078-4886-9.
- The Southern Past: a Clash of Race and Memory. Harvard University Press. 2005. ISBN 978-0-674-01876-1.
- Booker T. Washington and Black Progress : Up from Slavery 100 Years Later. Gainesville: University Press of Florida. 2003. ISBN 0813026741. OCLC 52079706.
- Brundage, W. Fitzhugh (2018). Civilizing Torture : An American Tradition. Cambridge, Massachusetts. ISBN 9780674737662. OCLC 1028589333.
- Introduction to Remembering Reconstruction: Struggles over the Meaning of America's Most Turbulent Era, Louisiana State University Press, 2017
- A Fate Worse than Hell: American Prisoners of the Civil War. W. W. Norton & Company. 2026. ISBN 978-0393541090.
