= William Watson Davis =

William Watson Davis (February 12, 1884 - April 5, 1960) was a professor and author in the United States. He was part of the white supremacist Dunning School of Confederate sympathizing anti-Reconstruction Southern scholars during the Jim Crow era.

Davis was born in Pensacola, Florida to Mathew L. Davis and Annie Laurie Lane Davis. He married Roxana Henderson in 1915 and they had one child, Edward Lane Davis.

Davis studied at Wright Military Academy in Mobile, Alabama; Alabama Polytechnic Institute;, and Columbia University (Ph.D. 1913.). He was a professor of history at the University of Kansas from 1912 until 1954.

His book on Reconstruction era Florida, based on his Ph.D. thesis, was reissued as part of a series celebrating Florida's quadricenntennial featuring the governor and cabinet on the opening pages. Other books in the series included Carpetbag Rule in Florida, putatively by John Wallace. Fletcher M. Green wrote a lengthy introduction to the quadricentennial edition covering Davis's life, publishings, and criticisms of the Dunning School.

== Bibliography ==
- Ante-Bellum Southern Commercial Conventions, Montgomery, Alabama, 1905
- The Civil War and Reconstruction in Florida. Columbia University Press, New York, 1913
