= Dunning School =

Historiographical school of thought regarding Reconstruction

The Dunning School was an historiographical school of thought regarding the Reconstruction period of American history (1865–1877), supporting conservative elements against the Radical Republicans who introduced civil rights in the South. It was named for Columbia University professor William Archibald Dunning, who taught many of its followers.

== Profile ==
The Dunning School viewpoint focused on conservative elements in the South (the Redeemers, plantation owners and former Confederates) and disparaged Radical Republicans who favored civil rights for former slaves. The views of the Dunning School dominated scholarly and popular depictions of the era from about 1900 to the 1930s. Adam Fairclough, a British historian whose expertise includes Reconstruction, summarized the Dunningite themes:

All agreed that black suffrage had been a political blunder and that the Republican state governments in the South that rested upon black votes had been corrupt, extravagant, unrepresentative, and oppressive. The sympathies of the "Dunningite" historians lay with the white Southerners who resisted Congressional Reconstruction: whites who, organizing under the banner of the Conservative or Democratic Party, used legal opposition and extralegal violence to oust the Republicans from state power. Although "Dunningite" historians did not necessarily endorse those extralegal methods, they did tend to palliate them. From start to finish, they argued, Congressional Reconstruction—often dubbed "Radical Reconstruction"—lacked political wisdom and legitimacy.

Historian Eric Foner, a leading specialist in the Reconstruction Era, said of the Dunning School academics:

The traditional or Dunning School of Reconstruction was not just an interpretation of history. It was part of the edifice of the Jim Crow System. It was an explanation for and justification of taking the right to vote away from black people on the grounds that they completely abused it during Reconstruction. It was a justification for the white South resisting outside efforts in changing race relations because of the worry of having another Reconstruction. All of the alleged horrors of Reconstruction helped to freeze the minds of the white South in resistance to any change whatsoever. And it was only after the Civil Rights revolution swept away the racist underpinnings of that old view—i.e., that black people are incapable of taking part in American democracy—that you could get a new view of Reconstruction widely accepted. For a long time it was an intellectual straitjacket for much of the white South, and historians have a lot to answer for in helping to propagate a racist system in this country.

In contrast to Foner's views, Fairclough argued that the influence of the Dunning School outside of academia was minimal; its hostile view of Reconstruction had already been established as the predominant view in white society long before any of the Dunning School historians published their works on Reconstruction. Works of popular culture like The Birth of a Nation that shared its view of Reconstruction did not use its historians as a source.

== History ==
The school was named after Columbia University professor William Archibald Dunning (1857–1922), whose writings and those of his Ph.D. students comprised the main elements of the school. He supported the idea that the South had been hurt by Reconstruction and that American values had been trampled by the use of the U.S. Army to control state politics. He contended that freedmen had proved incapable of self-government and thus had made segregation necessary. Dunning believed that allowing blacks to vote and hold office had been "a serious error". As a professor, he taught generations of scholars, many of whom expanded his views of the evils of Reconstruction. The Dunning School and similar historians dominated the version of Reconstruction-era history in textbooks into the 1960s. Their generalized adoption of deprecatory terms such as scalawags for southern white Republicans and carpetbaggers for northerners who worked and settled in the South, have persisted in historical works.

Explaining the success of the Dunning School, historian Peter Novick noted two forces – the need to reconcile the North and the South after the Civil War, and the increase in racism as Social Darwinism appeared to back the concept with science – that contributed to a "racist historiographical consensus" around the turn of the 20th century on the "criminal outrages" of Reconstruction. Novick provided examples of the style of the Dunning School approach when he wrote:

James Ford Rhodes, citing [Louis] Agassiz, said that "what the whole country has only learned through years of costly and bitter experience was known to this leader of scientific thought before we ventured on the policy of trying to make negroes intelligent by legislative acts." John W. Burgess wrote that "a black skin means membership in a race of men which has never of itself succeeded in subjecting passion to reason." For William A. Dunning, blacks "had no pride of race and no aspiration or ideals save to be like whites." Ellis Paxson Oberholtzer quoted approvingly the southern observation that Yankees didn't understand the subject because they "had never seen a nigger except Fred Douglass." Blacks were "as credulous as children, which in intellect they in many ways resembled."

Even James Wilford Garner's Reconstruction in Mississippi, regarded by W. E. B. Du Bois as the fairest work of the Dunning School, depicted Reconstruction as "unwise" and Black politicians as liabilities to Southern administrations.

In the 1940s Howard K. Beale began to define a different approach. Beale's analysis combined an assumption of "racial egalitarianism and an insistence on the centrality of class". He claimed that some of the more progressive southern historians continued to propose "that their race must bar Negroes from social and economic equality." Beale indicated other southern historians' making more positive contributions were "southern liberals" such as C. Vann Woodward and Francis Simkins.

=== Coulter ===
While he did not study with Dunning or at Columbia University, the Southern historian E. Merton Coulter represented some typical views. According to the New Georgia Encyclopedia, he "framed his literary corpus to praise the Old South, glorify Confederate heroes, vilify northerners, and denigrate southern blacks." He taught at the University of Georgia for sixty years, founded the Southern Historical Association, and edited the Georgia Historical Quarterly for fifty years, so he had many avenues of influence. Historian John Hope Franklin wrote of Coulter:

No sooner was revisionism launched, however, than E. Merton Coulter insisted that "no amount of revision can write away the grievous mistakes made in this abnormal period of American history." He then declared that he had not attempted to do so, and with that he subscribed to virtually all of the views that had been set forth by the students of Dunning. And he added a few observations of his own, such as "education soon lost its novelty for most of the Negroes"; they would "spend their last piece of money for a drink of whisky"; and, being "by nature highly emotional and excitable ..., they carried their religious exercises to extreme lengths."

Eric Foner wrote in 1988:

The fact that blacks took part in government, wrote E. Merton Coulter in the last full-scale history of Reconstruction written entirely within the Dunning tradition, was a "diabolical" development, "to be remembered, shuddered at, and execrated." Yet while these works abounded in horrified references to "negro rule" and "negro government", blacks in fact played little role in the narratives. Their aspirations, if mentioned at all, were ridiculed, and their role in shaping the course of events during Reconstruction ignored. When the writers spoke of "the South" or "the people", they meant whites. Blacks appeared either as passive victims of white manipulation or as an unthinking people whose "animal natures" threatened the stability of civilized society.

== Criticism of the Dunning School ==
The Dunning School was criticized by John R. Lynch in his 1913 book The Facts of Reconstruction, in which he argued that African American politicians had made many gains since the end of the Civil War and that those gains were of their own accord.

In 1935, W. E. B. DuBois attacked the premises of the Dunning School in Black Reconstruction in America, setting forth ideas such as the active agency of blacks in the era, that the struggle over control of black labor was central to the politics of the era, and that Reconstruction was a time of great promise and many accomplishments, the overthrow of which was a tragic defeat for democracy. While the work was largely ignored by historians at the time, later revisionist scholars lauded DuBois's analysis.

Historian Kenneth M. Stampp was one of the leaders of the revisionist movement regarding Reconstruction, which mounted a successful attack on Dunning's racially biased narrative. In putting his criticism in proper context, Stampp wrote:

Few revisionists would claim that the Dunning interpretation of reconstruction is a pure fabrication. They recognize the shabby aspects of the era: the corruption was real, the failures obvious, the tragedy undeniable. Grant is not their idea of a model President, nor were the southern carpetbag governments worthy of their unqualified praise. They understood that the radical Republicans were not all selfless patriots, and that southern white men were not all Negro-hating rebels. In short, they have not turned history on its head, but rather, they recognize that much of what Dunning's disciples have said about reconstruction is true.

Stampp then noted that "Dunningites overlooked a great deal", and revisionists rejected "the two-dimensional characters that Dunning's disciples have painted". Stampp asserted that even in accurately identifying the corruption of many state reconstruction governments, the Dunning School fell short. It engaged in "distortion by exaggeration, by a lack of perspective, by superficial analysis, and by overemphasis", while ignoring "constructive accomplishments" and failing to acknowledge "men who transcended the greed" of the age.

Historian Jean Edward Smith wrote that the Dunning School "despite every intention to be fair ... shaped their monographs to support prevailing attitudes of white supremacy". Smith stated, "Blacks were depicted as inherently incapable of meaningful political participation while terrorist organizations such as the Ku Klux Klan were applauded for their efforts to restore the South's natural order." Referring to "the racist rants of the Dunning school", Smith noted that the influence of the Civil Rights Movement of the 1950s and 1960s "consigned the Dunning school to the museum of historical artifacts".

Writing in 2005, the influential Reconstruction historian Eric Foner analyzed the Dunning School as follows:

Their account of the era rested, as one member of the Dunning school put it, on the assumption of "negro incapacity." Finding it impossible to believe that blacks could ever be independent actors on the stage of history, with their own aspirations and motivations, Dunning, et al. portrayed African Americans either as "children", ignorant dupes manipulated by unscrupulous whites, or as savages, their primal passions unleashed by the end of slavery.

Philip R. Muller, while acknowledging the widespread charges of racism against Dunning personally, laid much of the perception on Dunning's "methodological weakness" in one particular work, Reconstruction, Political and Economic 1865–1877. Muller noted that "faulty ... generalizations" abounded.

They are not, however, chiefly characterized by their hostility toward ethnic groups. Dunning's antipathy in Reconstruction is generously heaped on all groups, regardless of race, color, creed, or sectional origins. If, as one historian has suggested, Dunning viewed Reconstruction as "a mob run riot", the unruly crowd was biracial and bipartisan. More important, the concentration of "evidence" in this single scantily researched volume suggested that Dunning's "racist" generalizations were more unexamined than "inflexible".

Some historians have suggested that historians sympathetic to the Neo-Confederate movement are influenced by the Dunning School's interpretation of history.

== Dunning School scholars ==
- Bowers, Claude (1929). The Tragic Era: The Revolution after Lincoln. Cambridge, Massachusetts: The Riverside Press. Best-selling popular history by an Indiana writer.
- Coulter, E. Merton (1947). The South During Reconstruction. Baton Rouge, Louisiana: Louisiana State University Press.
- Davis, William Watson (1913). The Civil War and Reconstruction in Florida. New York: Longmans, Green & Co.
- Hamilton, J. G. de Roulhac (1914). Reconstruction in North Carolina (PhD thesis). Columbia University.
- Fleming, Walter L. (1905). Civil War and Reconstruction in Alabama. Columbia University Press.
- Garner, James Wilford (1901). Reconstruction in Mississippi. New York: Macmillan.
- Lonn, Ella (1918). Reconstruction in Louisiana After 1868. New York: G.P. Putnam's Sons.
- Ramsdell, Charles W. (1910). Reconstruction in Texas. New York: Longmans, Green & Co.
- ——— (1944). Behind the Lines in the Southern Confederacy. New York: Greenwood Press. Published posthumously.
- Reynolds, John Schreiner (February 17, 2018) [first pub. 1905]. Reconstruction in South Carolina, 1865–1877. Creative Media Partners. ISBN 978-1377847641.
- Staples, Thomas (1923). Reconstruction in Arkansas, 1862–1874 (PhD thesis). Columbia University.
- Thompson, C. Mildred (1915). Reconstruction in Georgia: Economic, Political, Social, 1965–1872. Studies in History, Economics and Public Law. Vol. LXIV. New York: Columbia University Press.
