= Charles W. Ramsdell =

American historian (1877–1942)

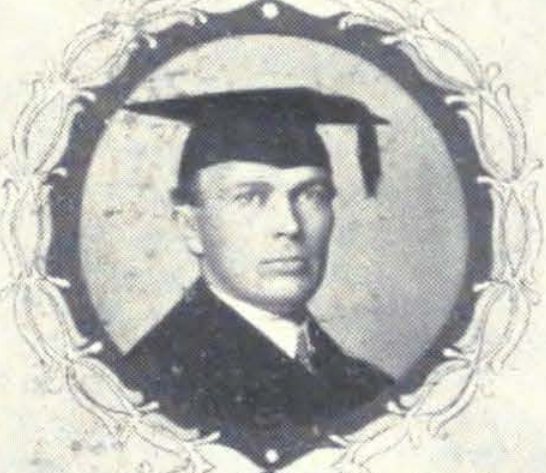
- Ramsdell in 1903
- Born: April 4, 1877; Salado, Bell County, Texas, US
- Died: July 4, 1942 (aged 65); Dallas, Texas, US
- Spouse: Susanna Griffin

Academic background
- Education: University of Texas (BA, 1903; MA, 1904); Columbia University (PhD, 1910)
- Thesis: 'Reconstruction in Texas' (1910)
- Influences: William Dunning, Lester Gladstone Bugbee, George Pierce Garrison, Eugene C. Barker, Herbert Eugene Bolton

Academic work
- Discipline: History
- Sub-discipline: History of the Southern United States
- Institutions: University of Texas; Texas State Historical Association; Southern Historical Association; Mississippi Valley Historical Association; American Historical Association
- Main interests: Confederate States of America
- Notable works: "Lincoln and Fort Sumter" (Journal of Southern History v.3, 1937, pp.259-88)
- Notable ideas: That Abraham Lincoln manipulated the Confederacy into firing the first shots of the Civil War at Fort Sumter

Charles William Ramsdell (April 4, 1877 – July 3, 1942) was an American historian who concentrated on the history of the Southern United States, especially the Confederacy.

== Early life ==
Charles William Ramsdell was born on April 4, 1877, in Salado, Texas. His father, Charles H. Ramsdell, arrived in Texas from New England just before the Civil War. He enlisted as a private for the Confederate States of America. Charles H. worked as a merchant and as a cotton farmer. His mother was Fredonia (Halley) Ramsdell, who bore four sons and two daughters.

During Reconstruction, prior to Ramsdell's birth, Bell County, Texas, was the location of anti-Unionist violence. Union troops were called in to enforce the peace, and Hiram Christian, a federal judge, administered Reconstruction law in the area. By 1870, however, anti-Unionists drove the Reconstruction officials out of Bell County. Ramsdell grew up in an area that persisted in anti-Union sentiment.

Ramsdell attended public schools, but completed his secondary education at Thomas Arnold High School, a private institution in Salado.

== Career ==
Ramsdell was a school teacher in the Houston area around 1900. He enrolled at the University of Texas in 1900. In addition to embarking on a "classical curriculum," he was a star on the university's football team, and served as the team's captain for his final season. At a time when college football players were often hard-drinking denizens of the university nightlife, he promoted the example of the student-athlete, according to historian Joe B. Frantz.

Ramsdell was the senior class president. He earned a B.A. and M.A. in 1903 and 1904, respectively. Among his influences as an undergraduate were Professor Lester G. Bugbee and his classmates, Eugene Campbell Barker and Herbert Eugene Bolden. He completed his doctorate in 1910 at Columbia University, where he was a student of William Dunning, remaining an adherent of the now-controversial Dunning School of the Reconstruction era throughout his career.

Ramsdell was a professor of history at the University of Texas from 1906 until his death in 1942. His research centered on the history of the Old South from 1800 to the close of the Reconstruction Era. He assembled at the university a large collection of manuscripts and other printed material on that subject, and was instrumental in building the university's Littlefield collection on southern history. During summer sessions, he taught at the University of Illinois (1923, 1926), the University of Colorado (1924), Columbia University (1927), the University of North Carolina (1928), Western Reserve University (1930), Northwestern University (1932), the University of West Virginia (1933), the University of Missouri (1935) and Duke University (1938).

As a southerner and a historian of the South, Ramsdell was proud that new generations of southern historians had moved away from the apologias which earlier generations had produced, and were instead writing what he saw as objective accounts of Southern history. Because of this, he bemoaned, frequently in person and once in print, the failure of these works to receive recognition by northern historians.

== Memberships ==
Ramsdell was a member of a number of academic organizations:

- From 1907 until his death in 1942, he was the Secretary-Treasurer of the Texas State Historical Association, and a member of its executive committee.
- From 1910 to 1938, Ramsdell was Associate Editor of the Southwestern Historical Quarterly.
- For the Mississippi Valley Historical Association he was president in 1928 to 1929, member and chairman of the executive committee from 1930 to 1935, and a member of the Board of Editors of the Mississippi Valley Historical Review from 1930 to 1933.
- Ramsdell was a member of the Executive Council of the Southern Historical Association from 1935 to 1939, and its president in 1936. He also served on the editorial board of the Journal of Southern History from 1937 to 1940.

== Works ==
Ramsdell was not a prolific writer. One scholar commented about his output, "I have never known a man who knew so much and wrote so little." According to Wendell H. Stephenson, Ramsdell's bibliography included "three books (one of them in collaboration), two edited works, twenty-two articles, six unpublished papers, fifteen contributions to the Dictionary of American Biography and two to the Dictionary of American History, and some sixty book reviews. ... Articles appeared every year or two, and book reviews averaged two a year."

At the time of his death, Ramsdell was the co-editor of a projected ten-volume multiple-authored "History of the South", of which his own history of the Confederacy was to have been a part. He had been working on that volume for some twenty years, but his perfectionism and continuing search for new material prevented its completion.

Of Ramsdell's journal articles, one in particular has noted as being influential. In 1937 in the Journal of Southern History (vol 3, pp. 259–288) Ramsdell's essay "Lincoln and Fort Sumter" made the case that Lincoln had deliberately manipulated the Confederacy into attacking Fort Sumter in order for the South to bear the onus of firing the first shot and initiating the hostilities of the Civil War. Lincoln did this, according to Ramsdell, because he knew that war was the only way he could save his administration and the Republican Party and bring the divided North together. Civil War historian James M. McPherson cites Ramsdell – along with J. S. Tilley in his 1941 book Lincoln Takes Command – as being the "two principal historians who advanced this interpretation" of events.

Books written

- Reconstruction in Texas (1910). New York: Longmans, Green and Company. (PhD. dissertation)
- A School History of Texas (with Eugene C. Barker and Charles S. Potts, 1912). Chicago: Row, Peterson and Company.
- Behind the Lines in the Southern Confederacy (1943). Baton Rouge: Louisiana State University Press.

Books edited

- The History of Bell County by George W. Tyler (1936). Austin, Texas: Naylor Company.
- Laws and Joint Resolutions of the Last Session of the Confederate Congress (November 7, 1864—March 18, 1865) Together with the Secret Acts of Previous Congresses (1941). Durham, North Carolina: Duke University Press.

== Death ==
Ramsdell died on July 3, 1942.
