= SS Walter L. Fleming =

World War II Liberty ship of the United States

History

United States
- Name: Walter L. Fleming
- Namesake: Walter L. Fleming
- Owner: War Shipping Administration (WSA)
- Operator: Waterman Steamship Corp.
- Ordered: as type (EC2-S-C1) hull, MC hull 1542
- Builder: J.A. Jones Construction, Panama City, Florida
- Cost: $1,314,932
- Yard number: 24
- Way number: 2
- Laid down: 31 October 1943
- Launched: 7 December 1943
- Completed: 30 January 1944
- Identification: Call Signal: KUVZ
- Fate: Laid up in National Defense Reserve Fleet, James River Group, Lee Hall, Virginia, 24 May 1946; Sold for scrapping, 15 September 1959

General characteristics
- Class & type: Liberty ship; type EC2-S-C1, standard
- Tonnage: 10,865 LT DWT; 7,176 GRT
- Displacement: 3,380 long tons (3,434 t) (light); 14,245 long tons (14,474 t) (max)
- Length: 441 feet 6 inches (135 m) oa; 416 feet (127 m) pp; 427 feet (130 m) lwl
- Beam: 57 feet (17 m)
- Draft: 27 ft 9.25 in (8.4646 m)
- Installed power: 2 × Oil fired 450 °F (232 °C) boilers, operating at 220 psi (1,500 kPa); 2,500 hp (1,900 kW)
- Propulsion: 1 × triple-expansion steam engine, (manufactured by Filer and Stowell, Milwaukee, Wisconsin); 1 × screw propeller
- Speed: 11.5 knots (21.3 km/h; 13.2 mph)
- Capacity: 562,608 cubic feet (15,931 m^{3}) (grain); 499,573 cubic feet (14,146 m^{3}) (bale)
- Complement: 38–62 USMM; 21–40 USNAG
- Armament: Varied by ship; Bow-mounted 3-inch (76 mm)/50-caliber gun; Stern-mounted 4-inch (102 mm)/50-caliber gun; 2–8 × single 20-millimeter (0.79 in) Oerlikon anti-aircraft (AA) cannons and/or, 2–8 × 37-millimeter (1.46 in) M1 AA guns

SS Walter L. Fleming was a Liberty ship built in the United States during World War II. She was named after Walter L. Fleming, American Civil War historian and Dean of the Vanderbilt University College of Arts and Science in 1923, and later Director of the Graduate School.

== Construction ==
Walter L. Fleming was laid down on 31 October 1943, under a United States Maritime Commission (MARCOM) contract, MC hull 1542, by J.A. Jones Construction, Panama City, Florida; she was launched on 7 December 1943.

== History ==
She was allocated to Waterman Steamship Corp., on 30 January 1944. On 24 May 1946, she was laid up in the National Defense Reserve Fleet, in the James River Group, Lee Hall, Virginia. On 15 September 1959, she was sold, along with nine other ships, for $717,810 to Bethlehem Steel, for scrapping. She was withdrawn from the fleet on 28 September 1959.

== Bibliography ==
- "Jones Construction, Panama City FL". ShipbuildingHistory.com. 13 October 2010.
- "Liberty Ships – World War II".
- Maritime Administration. "Walter L. Fleming". Ship History Database Vessel Status Card. U.S. Department of Transportation, Maritime Administration. Archived from the original on 12 December 2019.
- Davies, James (May 2004). "Specifications (As-Built)" (PDF). p. 23.
- "SS Walter L. Fleming".
