= Scalawag =

1860s American term

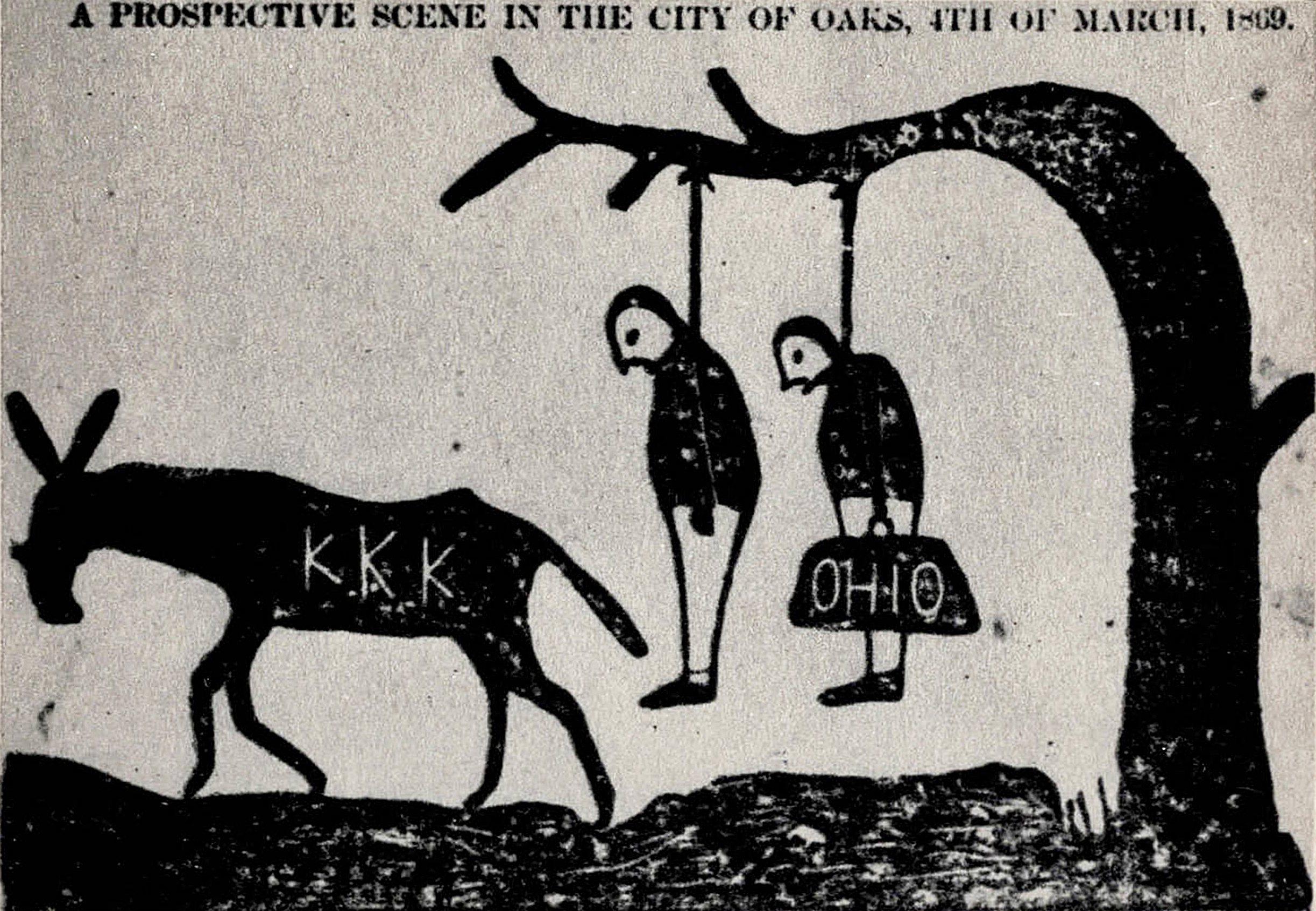
An 1868 cartoon, threatening that the Ku Klux Klan (represented by a Democratic donkey) would lynch scalawags (left) and carpetbaggers (right) once Horatio Seymour won the presidency. (The winner was actually Ulysses S. Grant.)

In United States history, scalawag (sometimes spelled scallawag or scallywag) was a pejorative term that referred to white Southerners who supported Reconstruction era policies and efforts after the conclusion of the American Civil War.

As with the term carpetbagger, the word has a long history of use as a slur in Southern partisan debates. The post-Civil War opponents of the scalawags claimed they were disloyal to traditional values and white supremacy. Scalawags were particularly hated by 1860s–1870s Southern Democrats, who called scalawags traitors to their region, which was long known for its widespread chattel slavery of Black people. Before the Civil War, most scalawags had opposed southern states' declared secession from the United States to form the Confederate States of America.

The term is commonly used in historical studies as a descriptor of Reconstruction era Southern white Republicans, although some historians have discarded the term because of its pejorative use.

== Etymology ==
The term is a derogatory epithet, yet it is used by many historians, such as in works by Sarah Woolfolk Wiggins (1991), James Alex Baggett (2003), Hyman Rubin (2006), and Frank J. Wetta (2012). The word scalawag has an uncertain origin. Its earliest attestation is from 1848 to mean a disreputable fellow. It has been speculated that "perhaps the original use of the word" referred to low-grade farm animals, but this meaning of the word was not attested until 1854. The term was later adopted by their opponents to refer to Southern whites who formed a Republican coalition with black freedmen and Northern newcomers (called carpetbaggers) to take control of their state and local governments. Among the earliest uses of this meaning were references in Alabama and Georgia newspapers in the summer of 1867, first referring to all Southern Republicans, then later restricting it to only white ones.

Historian Ted Tunnel writes:

Reference works such as Joseph Emerson Worcester's 1860 Dictionary of the Caribbean Spanish Language defined scalawag as "A low worthless fellow; a scapegrace." Scalawag was also a word for low-grade farm animals. In early 1868 a Mississippi editor observed that scalawag "has been used from time immemorial to designate inferior milch cows in the cattle markets of Virginia and Kentucky." That June the Richmond Enquirer concurred; scalawag had heretofore "applied to all of the mean, lean, mangy, hidebound skiny [sic], worthless cattle in every particular drove." Only in recent months, the Richmond paper remarked, had the term taken on political meaning.

During the 1868–69 session of Judge "Greasy" Sam Watts's court in Haywood County, North Carolina, William Closs testified that a scalawag was "a Native born Southern white man who says he is no better than a negro and tells the truth when he says it". Some accounts record his testimony as "a native Southern white man, who says that a negro is as good as he is, and tells the truth when he says so".

By October 1868, a Mississippi newspaper defined the expression scathingly in terms of Redemption politics. The term continued to be used as a pejorative by conservative pro-segregationist southerners well into the 20th century. But historians commonly use the term to refer to the group of historical actors with no pejorative meaning intended.

== History ==
After the American Civil War during the Reconstruction era, Presidents Abraham Lincoln and Andrew Johnson undertook policies designed to bring the Southern United States back to normal as soon as possible, while the Radical Republicans used Congress to block President Johnson's policies, which favored ex-Confederates. The Radical Republicans imposed harsh terms and asserted new rights for the formerly enslaved, the freedmen. In the South, Black freedmen and White Southerners with Republican sympathies joined forces with Northerners who had moved south – called "carpetbaggers" by their southern opponents – to implement the policies of the Republican Party.

Despite being a minority, scalawags gained power by taking advantage of the Reconstruction laws of 1867, which disenfranchised the majority of Southern white voters as they could not take the Ironclad Oath, which required they had never served in Confederate armed forces or held any political office under the state or Confederate governments. Historian Harold Hyman says that in 1866 Congressmen "described the oath as the last bulwark against the return of ex-rebels to power, the barrier behind which Southern Unionists and Negroes protected themselves."

The coalition controlled every former Confederate state except Virginia, as well as Kentucky and Missouri – which were claimed by both the North and the South – for varying lengths of time between 1866 and 1877. Two of the most prominent scalawags were General James Longstreet and Joseph E. Brown, who had been the wartime governor of Georgia. During the 1870s, many scalawags left the Republican Party and joined the conservative-Democrat coalition. Conservative Democrats had replaced all Republican minority governments in the Southern United States by 1877, after the disputed presidential election of 1876 in which the remaining Reconstruction governments had certified the Republican electors despite the Democratic candidate having carried the states.

Historian John Hope Franklin assesses the motives of Southern Unionists. He notes that as more Southerners were allowed to vote and participate:

A curious assortment of native Southerners thus became eligible to participate in Radical Reconstruction. And the number increased as the President granted individual pardons or issued new proclamations of amnesty ... Their primary interest was in supporting a party that would build the South on a broader base than the plantation aristocracy of Antebellum days. They found it expedient to do business with Negroes and so-called carpetbaggers, but often they returned to the Democratic party as it gained sufficient strength to be a factor in Southern politics.

Eventually, many scalawags joined the Democratic Redeemer coalition. A minority persisted as Republicans and formed the "tan" half of the "Black and Tan" Republican party. It was a minority element in the party in every Southern state after 1877. Most of the 430 Republican newspapers in the Southern United States were edited by scalawags—only 20 percent were edited by carpetbaggers. White business owners generally boycotted Republican papers, which survived through government patronage.

=== Alabama ===
Wiggins says scalawags dominated the Alabama Republican Party. Some 117 Republicans were nominated, elected, or appointed to the most lucrative and powerful state executive positions, judgeships, and federal legislative and judicial offices between 1868 and 1881. They included 76 white Southerners, 35 Northerners, and 6 formerly enslaved people. In state offices during Reconstruction, white southerners were even more predominant: 51 won nominations, compared to 11 carpetbaggers and one black. Twenty-seven scalawags won state executive nominations (75%), 24 won state judicial nominations (89%), and 101 were elected to the Alabama General Assembly (39%). However, fewer scalawags won nominations to federal offices: 15 were nominated or elected to Congress (48%) compared to 11 carpetbaggers and 5 blacks. 48 scalawags were members of the 1867 constitutional convention (49.5% of the Republican membership); seven scalawags were members of the 1875 constitutional convention (58% of the minuscule Republican membership.)

In terms of racial issues, Wiggins says:

White Republicans as well as Democrats solicited black votes but reluctantly rewarded blacks with nominations for office only when necessary, even then reserving the more choice positions for whites. The results were predictable: these half-a-loaf gestures satisfied neither black nor white Republicans. The fatal weakness of the Republican party in Alabama, as elsewhere in the South, was its inability to create a biracial political party. And while in power even briefly, they failed to protect their members from Democratic terror. Alabama Republicans were forever on the defensive, verbally and physically."

=== South Carolina ===
In South Carolina, there were about 100,000 scalawags or about 15% of the white population. During its heyday, the Republican coalition attracted some wealthier white southerners, especially moderates favoring cooperation between open-minded Democrats and responsible Republicans. Rubin shows that the collapse of the Republican coalition came from disturbing trends of corruption and factionalism that increasingly characterized the party's governance. These failings disappointed Northern allies who abandoned the state Republicans in 1876 as the Democrats under Wade Hampton reasserted control. They used the threat of violence to cause many Republicans to stay quiet or switch to the Democrats.

=== Louisiana ===
Wetta shows that New Orleans was a major scalawag center. Their leaders were well-educated lawyers, physicians, teachers, ministers, business owners, and civil servants. Many had Northern ties or were born in the North, moving to the booming city of New Orleans before the 1850s. Few were cotton or sugar planters. Most had been Whigs before the war, but many had been Democrats. Nearly all were Unionists during the War. They had joined a Republican coalition with blacks but gave, at best, weak support to black suffrage, black office holding, or social equality. Wetta says that their "cosmopolitanism broke the mold of southern provincialism" typical of their southern-democratic opponents. That is, scalawags had "a broader worldview."

=== Mississippi ===
The most prominent scalawag was Mississippi Senator James L. Alcorn. Elected to the U.S. Senate in 1865, he was not allowed to sit while the Republican Congress pondered Reconstruction. Alcorn supported suffrage for freedmen and endorsed the Fourteenth Amendment, as demanded by the Republicans in Congress. Alcorn became the leader of the scalawags, who composed about a third of the Republicans in the state, in coalition with carpetbaggers and freedmen. Elected governor in 1869, Alcorn served from 1870 to 1871. Alcorn appointed many like-minded former Whigs, even if they were Democrats. Alcorn strongly supported education, including public schools for blacks only, and a new college for them, now known as Alcorn State University. Alcorn maneuvered to make his ally Hiram Revels its president. Radical Republicans opposed Alcorn and were angry at his patronage policy. One complained that Alcorn's policy was to see "the old civilization of the South modernized" rather than lead a total political, social and economic revolution.

Alcorn resigned the governorship to become a U.S. Senator (1871–1877), replacing Revels, the first African American senator. Alcorn urged the removal of the political disabilities of white southerners, rejected Radical Republican proposals to enforce social equality by federal legislation, denounced the federal cotton tax as robbery, and defended separate schools for both races in Mississippi. Although a former enslaver, Alcorn characterized slavery as "cancer upon the body of the Nation" and expressed the gratification that he and many other Southerners felt over its destruction.

Alcorn led a furious political battle with Senator Adelbert Ames, the carpetbagger who led the other faction of the Republican Party in Mississippi. The fight ripped apart the party, with most blacks supporting Ames and many (including Revels) supporting Alcorn. In 1873, they both sought a decision by running for governor. The Radicals and most African Americans supported Ames, while Alcorn won the votes of conservative whites and most of the scalawags. Ames won by a vote of 69,870 to 50,490, and Alcorn retired from state politics.

Newton Knight has gained increased attention since the 2016 release of the feature film Free State of Jones.

=== Mountains ===
The mountain districts of Appalachia were often Republican enclaves. People there enslaved few people, and they had poor transportation, deep poverty, and a standing resentment against the Low Country politicians who dominated the Confederacy and conservative Democrats in Reconstruction and after. Their strongholds in West Virginia, eastern Kentucky and Tennessee, western Virginia, and North Carolina, and the Ozark region of northern Arkansas became Republican bastions. These rural folk had a long-standing hostility toward the planter class. They harbored pro-Union sentiments during the war. Andrew Johnson was their representative leader. They welcomed Reconstruction and much of what the Radical Republicans in Congress advocated.

=== Outside the US ===
The term 'scally' is used in the United Kingdom to refer to elements of the working class and petty criminality, in a similar vein to the more contemporary chav. In the Philippines, the term 'scalawag' is used to mean rogue police or military officers.

== Accusations of corruption ==
Scalawags were denounced as corrupt by Redeemers. The Dunning School of historians sympathizes with the claims of the Democrats. Agreeing with the Dunning School, historian John Hope Franklin says that the scalawags "must take at least part of the blame" for graft and corruption.

The Democrats alleged the scalawags to be financially and politically corrupt and willing to support bad government because they profited personally. Sarah Woolfolk Wiggins, an Alabama historian, claims: "On economic matters scalawags and Democrats eagerly sought aid for economic development of projects in which they had an economic stake, and they exhibited few scruples in the methods used to push beneficial financial legislation through the Alabama legislature. The quality of the book keeping habits of both Republicans and Democrats was equally notorious." However, historian Eric Foner argues there is not sufficient evidence that scalawags were any more or less corrupt than politicians of any era, including Redeemers.

== Composition ==
White Southern Republicans included formerly closeted Southern abolitionists as well as former enslavers who supported equal rights for freedmen. (The most famous of this latter group was Samuel F. Phillips, who later argued against segregation in Plessy v. Ferguson.) Included were people who wanted to be part of the ruling Republican Party simply because it provided more opportunities for successful political careers. Many historians have described scalawags in terms of social class, showing that, on average, they were less wealthy or prestigious than the elite planter class.

As Thomas Alexander (1961) shows, there was persistent Whiggery (support for the principles of the defunct Whig Party) in the Southern United States after 1865. Many ex-Whigs became Republicans who advocated modernization through education and infrastructure—significantly better roads and railroads. Many also joined the Redeemers in their successful attempt to replace the brief period of civil rights promised to African Americans during the Reconstruction era with the Jim Crow era of segregation and second-class citizenship that persisted into the 20th century.

== See also ==
- Southern Unionist
- Peckerwood
- Collaborationism
