= Fletcher Melvin Green =

Historian and writer

Fletcher Melvin Green (1895 - 1978) was a historian and writer at the University of North Carolina at Chapel Hill, where he was a faculty member from 1936 until 1960 and served as a department chair. The University has a collection of his papers. He also taught at Harvard and Oxford.

== Life ==
Melvin Green was born in Gainesville, Georgia and went to school in Murrayville, Georgia. He married and had four children.

== Career ==
He was Harold Vyvyan Harmsworth Professor of American History in 1968. He was part of the Southern Historical Association, which presents the Fletcher M. Green and Charles W. Ramsdell Award in even-numbered years for the best article published in the Journal of Southern History during the two preceding years.

Vernon Lane Wharton states in the preface to Negro in Mississippi 1865-1890 that the book was "inspired and directed by Professor Fletcher M. Green of the University of North Carolina."

In 1970, historian George M. Fredrickson wrote that Green "ranks as the elder statesman among historians of the South". He is buried at the Chapel Hill Memorial Cemetery.

== Writing and editing ==
He edited and wrote the introduction to Susan Dabney Smedes' Memorials of a Southern Planter (1965). He wrote the introduction to the Florida quadracentennial edition of William Watson Davis' The Civil War and Reconstruction in Florida. Some of his former students prepared the Festschrift, Writing Southern History: Essays in Honor of Fletcher M. Green, published in 1965, edited by Arthur S. Link and Rembert W. Patrick. It includes a bibliography of Green's writings. A collection of his articles and essays was published in 1970.

== Bibliography ==
- Constitutional Development in the South Atlantic States, 1776-1860: A Study in the Evolution of Democracy
- Democracy in the Old South and Other Essays
- The Role of the Yankee in the Old South
- Henry Kyd Douglas, I Rode With Stonewall; Essays in Southern History Presented to Joseph Grégoire de Roulhac Hamilton, editor
- The Lides Go South . . . and West: The Record of a Planter Migration in 1835; John Blackford, editor
- Volume one of Travels in the New South, editor
