= John Wallace (Florida politician) =

American politician

John Wallace (c. 1842 – November 25, 1908) was a teacher, lawyer, political leader and judge in Florida. Wallace served in the Union Army after being freed by federal soldiers during the American Civil War. He served in the Florida Legislature during the Reconstruction era. He also became a lawyer and argued cases before the Florida Supreme Court. He putatively wrote "Carpet-Bag Rule in Florida: The Inside Workings of Civil Government in Florida After the Close of the Civil War". At the time of his death, he had held public office longer than any other African-American elected official.

== Early life and freedom ==
Wallace was born in Gates County, North Carolina in 1842. His early life was spent in slavery. In February 1862, he was freed by Federal troops passing through the area.

== Civil War era ==
He enlisted in the 2nd United States Colored Infantry Regiment on August 15, 1863. He trained at Camp Casey . In December 1863, his unit was assigned to Ship Island, Mississippi. On February 13, 1864, Wallace travelled with his regiment to Key West, Florida.

In April 1864 two companies of the 2nd United States Colored Infantry Regiment were transferred from Key West to Fort Myers. The two companies participated in many actions in southwest Florida during the remainder of the year, as far north as Tampa Bay. On February 20, 1865, Confederate forces attacked Fort Myers, precipitating the Battle of Fort Myers. Wallace was wounded in that battle. An exploding cannonball threw dirt into his eyes, causing injuries that would plague him throughout his life. Wallace's outfit joined the Union force blockading Apalachee Bay. They landed near St. Marks on March 4, 1865 and marched on Tallahassee, in time to take part in the debacle at the Battle of Natural Bridge. Walker and the regiment would not reach Tallahassee until August 9, 1865.

== Teaching in Tallahassee ==
On leaving the service in January 1866, Wallace chose to remain in the Tallahassee area and became a protégé of Florida politician and planter William D. Bloxham. who gave Wallace a job teaching freed slaves at a school he set up on his plantation. The school and Wallace received high praise from a local paper. In 1868, he served as a page at the Florida Constitutional Convention.

== Political career ==
After the Convention, he was elected constable of Leon County and joined the Republican Party of Florida, and became advocate for the rights of African-Americans. He served as constable for two years before being elected to the legislature. In 1870, he was elected to the Florida House of Representatives He was re-elected in 1872, despite a propensity for public violence. In 1874, he was elected to the Florida Senate and became a lawyer. He was photographed on the steps of the Florida Capitol with other legislators.

He made an unsuccessful bid for Congress in 1876. In 1878, his bid for re-election was unsuccessful. However, he was seated by the Senate after alleging fraud.

== Post Reconstruction ==
In 1877, the federal occupation ended, with profound consequences for African Americans and for the Florida Republican Party. Blacks were systematically disenfranchised, and Florida would not see another Republican governor until Claude R. Kirk, Jr. in 1967. Democrats regained control of the legislature. Black Republicans, including Wallace, became increasingly disillusioned. Wallace helped lead the Florida independent movement, and ran unsuccessfully as an Independent in the 1882 race for the state senate. In 1884, he supported Independent Frank Pope in the gubernatorial race with great optimism, but Black and liberal white voters were no longer strong enough to win elections in Florida. Wallace again ran for the Senate, but finished thirteenth. He was appointed a Customs House inspector in Key West for $2 per day, but was replaced in 1885, following the election of U.S. President Grover Cleveland. He left Key West and opened a law practice in Jacksonville. He argued a number of cases before the Florida Supreme Court.

Carpet-Bag Rule in Florida was published in 1888, just before the election of that year. The book portrays the Republican Party as abusing, for political ends, the allegedly misplaced trust of Blacks, whose true friends, according to the book, were the Democrats. Questions have been raised as to whether Wallace actually authored the book, and whether it was written instead by Wallace's old mentor, Bloxham. Critics feel that whoever wrote it, it was heavily influenced by and advantageous to Bloxham. Certainly Wallace had been embittered by his experiences as a Republican, and the book captured those sentiments. Hailed as a vigorous exposé after publication, in more recent years its authority and authenticity have come under doubt. The book had little effect on Wallace. He continued to practice law and eschewed politics. Between 1891 and 1904, he won four of eleven appeals before the Florida Supreme Court. Wallace died on November 25, 1908, in Jacksonville, at the age of sixty-three.

== Sources ==
- Clark, James C. "John Wallace and the Writing of Reconstruction History." in The Florida Historical Quarterly. April 1988. 409 - 427. The Florida Historical Society.
