= J. G. de Roulhac Hamilton =

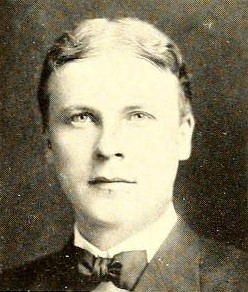
Hamilton c. 1912

Joseph Grégoire de Roulhac Hamilton (1878–1961) was an American historian of the South, author, and the founder of the Southern Historical Collection at the University of North Carolina at Chapel Hill, North Carolina, where he spent most of his academic career. He published books and articles about the history of Reconstruction but his most influential role was as an archivist, collecting manuscripts from around the South that form the core of the Southern Historical Collection.

== Background and education ==
Hamilton was born in Hillsborough, North Carolina, in Orange County not far from Chapel Hill. His undergraduate study was at the University of the South, where he completed an M.A. in 1900. After a few years teaching at Horner Military Academy, Hamilton went to Columbia University where he studied with William Archibald Dunning, the leading historian of Reconstruction. Like many of Dunning's students, Hamilton wrote his Ph.D. dissertation about the course of Reconstruction in his native state.

== Career at University of North Carolina ==
Upon completing his Ph.D. in 1906, Hamilton was appointed associate professor of history at the University of North Carolina. He became head of the history department in 1908 and helped it become one of the leading centers for graduate study in American history. Over the next twenty years, Hamilton published a number of books, especially on North Carolina topics. He collected and published letters by important historical figures from North Carolina such as William Richardson Davie, Jonathan Worth, and John Rust Eaton. In addition to his Ph.D. dissertation on Reconstruction in North Carolina, Hamilton published Party Politics in North Carolina, 1835-1860 and several works aimed at schoolchildren.

As early as 1915, Hamilton had begun collecting manuscripts from around the South to add to the history department's collection, and in the 1920s, he began to plan to create an archive at the University of North Carolina for materials on the history of the South. He made many trips around the region collecting documents. The Southern Historical Collection was opened in 1930, and Hamilton resigned his position in the history department in order to become its first director, a position he held until his retirement in 1951. He hired Elizabeth Brownrigg Henderson Cotten as his assistant and later appointed her as the collection's first curator.

In 1972, UNC named a new social sciences building Hamilton Hall in his honor.

In 2020, UNC began the process of removing his name from Hamilton Hall in favor of Pauli Murray. The academic departments involved cited "the history of our University and Professor Hamilton’s role in shaping it for the benefit of white supremacy".

== Books ==
- William Richardson Davie: A Memoir (1907)
- The Correspondence of Jonathan Worth (1909)
- Benjamin Sherwood Hedrick (1910)
- Letters of John Rust Eaton (1910)
- Bartlett Yancey (1911)
- A Syllabus of North Carolina History, 1584–1876 (1913, with William K. Boyd)
- Reconstruction in North Carolina (1914)
- Party Politics in North Carolina (1916)
- The Life of Robert E. Lee for Boys and Girls (1917)
- The Papers of Thomas Ruffin (1918–20)
- History of North Carolina (1919)
