= Walter L. Fleming =

American historian (1874–1932)

Walter Lynwood Fleming
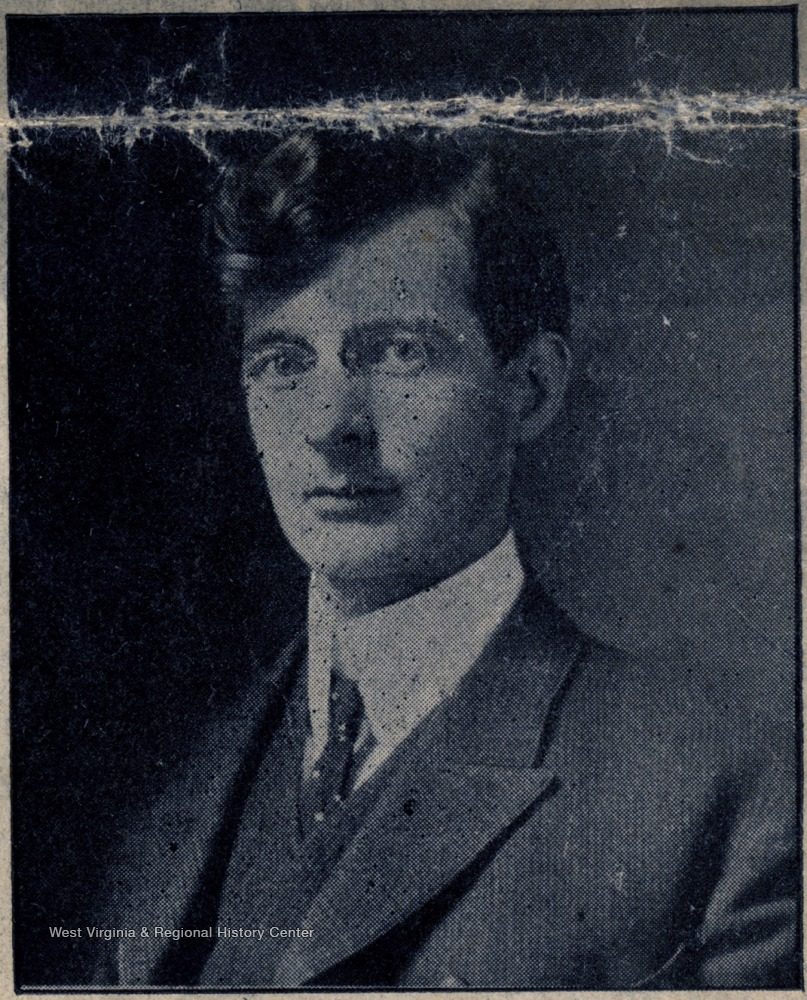
- Fleming in 1907
- Born: April 8, 1874; Brundidge, Alabama, U.S.
- Died: 1932 (aged 57–58)
- Education: Alabama Polytechnic Institute; Columbia University
- Occupation: Historian

Walter Lynwood Fleming (1874–1932) was an American historian of the South and Reconstruction. He was a leader of the Dunning School of scholars in the early 20th century, who addressed Reconstruction era history using historiographical technique. He was a professor at Vanderbilt University from 1917 through his career, also serving as Dean of the School of Arts and Sciences, and Director of the Graduate School. A prolific writer, he published ten books and 166 articles and reviews. The son of a plantation owner who had slaves, Fleming was sympathetic to White supremacist arguments and Democratic Party positions of his era while critical of Republicans and Reconstruction.

== Biography ==
Walter Lynwood Fleming was born on a plantation at Brundidge, Alabama, on April 8, 1874, the son of William LeRoy and Mary Love (Edwards) Fleming. Both his parents were born in Georgia and had migrated west with their families to Alabama in the ante-bellum period as cotton was developed as the area's commodity crop. His father, a well-to-do planter and slave owner, served in the Civil War as a cavalryman. He was not politically prominent during Reconstruction.

Fleming attended Alabama Polytechnic Institute, now known as Auburn University, taking the B.S. degree, with honors, in 1896, and the M.S. degree in 1897. He taught in the public schools of Alabama in 1894–1896. He became an instructor in History and English at his alma mater in 1896–1897. He was assistant librarian from 1897 to 1898, and an instructor in English from 1899 to 1900.

In 1898 Fleming enlisted in the Second Alabama Volunteers as a private; was promoted to lieutenant, and fought in the Spanish–American War.

Fleming began graduate work in history at Columbia University in New York in 1900, taking the PhD in 1904. In his studies, he was influenced especially by Professor George Petrie of Alabama Polytechnic Institute and Professor William Archibald Dunning of Columbia.

== Academic career ==
In his early career from 1903 to 1907, Fleming taught history at West Virginia University, and from 1907 to 1917 at Louisiana State University. While Woodrow Wilson was president of Princeton University, he tried to attract Fleming from Louisiana to his institution, offering him a professorship, which the latter declined.

In 1917, Fleming was called to a chair in history at Vanderbilt University in Nashville, Tennessee. He taught undergraduate and graduate students, mentoring numerous PhDs. Many of them later led history programs at colleges across the South. He became Dean of the Vanderbilt College of Arts and Sciences in 1923 and later Director of the Graduate School.

Fleming was close to the Nashville Agrarians, some of whom also taught at Vanderbilt. They dedicated their influential manifesto, I'll Take My Stand: The South and the Agrarian Tradition (1930), to Fleming.

== Historical research ==
Fleming helped edit and contribute to numerous reference works, including The Historians' History of the World, 25 volumes (1904); volumes XI and XII of The South in the Building of the Nation, (1909); The Photographic History of the Civil War, 10 volumes (1911); the Encyclopædia Britannica, Eleventh Edition, (1911) and 14th edition (1929); and the Dictionary of American Biography, 20 volumes (1928–36).

He was among the Dunning School historians who argued that Northerners had spoiled Reconstruction by trampling the rights of Southern whites. Fleming based his studies of Reconstruction in his knowledge of the ante-bellum period.

More than other historians of this period, he drew from the writings of African Americans and studied their political activities. He wrote

The negro is the central figure in the reconstruction of the South. Without the negro there would have been no Civil War. Granting a war fought for any other cause, the task of reconstruction would, without him, have been comparatively simple.

More than any white historian of Reconstruction before the 1960s, Fleming gave extensive attention to the roles of the Blacks, including economic and social conditions. Fleming was the first scholar to examine the Black exodus to Kansas, in "'Pap' Singleton, the Moses of the Colored Exodus" (1909). His study, The Freedmen's Savings Bank: A Chapter in the Economic History of the Negro Race (1927), was reprinted by Negro Universities Press in 1970.

Along with Frederick Jackson Turner, Fleming was one of a few historians to publish in sociology journals. Fleming was among the first to emphasize the social, religious and economic dimensions of Reconstruction and its complexity.

He tried to provide evidence of all viewpoints. For instance, in his highly influential Documentary History of Reconstruction (vol 1), Fleming included 64 documents to express the viewpoint of white Democratic Southerners, 118 from their opponents (including 12 blacks), and 70 which he considered neutral. In terms of documents, 25 were state laws, 17 were federal laws, 148 were accounts by Northerners, 62 were by ex-Confederates, 22 from Southern Unionists, and 12 from Blacks.

W. E. B. Du Bois wrote that Fleming's works were "anti-Negro in spirit," but admitted they have "a certain fairness and sense of historic honesty." A 1936 reviewer of the Documentary History for the American Historical Review said that Fleming's "sympathies are decidedly with the South, but the work is free from bitterness or prejudice, and is on the whole as impartial an account as one can expect from any writer on this subject."

== Professional activities ==
Fleming was active in professional historical and archival associations. He was a member of the Board of Editors of the Mississippi Valley Historical Review from 1914 to 1922, and he served on the Committee for State Historical Museums, and the program and nominating committees of the Mississippi Valley Historical Association.

As a member of the Public Archives Commission of the American Historical Association, he surveyed the state archives of West Virginia and Louisiana. He represented the AHA on the National Board of Historical Service and also served on the committee on appointments and the general and program committees. He was a member of the Executive Council of the AHA for two terms and served twice as chairman of the John H. Dunning Prize Committee. Fleming appeared on the program of both these associations as well as that of the Alabama Historical Society.

== Criticism ==
In his 1979 presidential address to the American History Association, historian John Hope Franklin contrasted Fleming's treatment of black Alabama Congressman James T. Rapier with William L. Yancey, a white Confederate who had also been educated in the North. Rapier was born in Alabama but his father, a free black, sent him to Canada for an education. Rapier served as a school teacher in Canada until 1864; he returned to Alabama in 1866.

Franklin said:

Writing in 1905 Walter L. Fleming referred to James T. Rapier, a Negro member of the Alabama constitutional convention of 1867, as "Rapier of Canada." He then quoted Rapier as saying that the manner in which "colored gentlemen and ladies were treated in America was beyond his comprehension."

Franklin explained:

Born in Alabama in 1837, Rapier, like many of his white contemporaries, went North for an education. The difference was that instead of stopping in the northern part of the United States, as, for example, (the pro-slavery advocate) William L. Yancey did, Rapier went on to Canada. Rapier's contemporaries did not regard him as a Canadian; and, if some were not precisely clear about where he was born (as was the Alabama State Journal, which referred to his birthplace as Montgomery rather than Florence), they did not misplace him altogether.

Franklin said Fleming knew the truth about Rapier's Canadian status and misrepresented it. Franklin wrote:

In 1905 Fleming made Rapier a Canadian because it suited his purposes to have a bold, aggressive, "impertinent" Negro in Alabama Reconstruction come from some non-Southern, contaminating environment like Canada. But it did not suit his purposes to call Yancey, who was a graduate of Williams College, a "Massachusetts Man." Fleming described Yancey (a white Confederate) as, simply, the "leader of the States Rights men."

Franklin criticized Fleming for characterizing Rapier and others as carpetbaggers. He said,

some of the people that Fleming called carpetbaggers had lived in Alabama for years and were, therefore, entitled to at least as much presumption of assimilation in moving from some other state to Alabama decades before the war as the Irish were in moving from their native land to some community in the United States. ...Whether they had lived in Alabama for decades before the Civil War or had settled there after the war, these "carpetbaggers" were apparently not to be regarded as models for Northern investors or settlers in the early years of the 20th century. 20th-century investors from the North were welcome provided they accepted the established arrangements in race relations and the like. Fleming served his Alabama friends well by ridiculing carpetbaggers, even if in the process he had to distort and misrepresent.

== Legacy and honors ==
- The annual Walter Lynwood Fleming Lectures in Southern History were established in his name at Louisiana State University.
- During World War II the Liberty ship SS Walter L. Fleming was built in Panama City, Florida, and named in his honor.

== Publications ==
- "The Buford Expedition to Kansas," American Historical Review, VI (1901), 38-48.
- "Documentary History of Reconstruction" Volume I (A.H. Clark Company, 1906) and Volume II (1907).
  - Documentary History of Reconstruction: Political, Military, Social, Religious, Educational & Industrial: 1865 to 1906 (reprinted 1966 with introduction by David Donald) 2 vols., xviii, 493 and xiv, 480 pp.
- Civil War and Reconstruction in Alabama (1905). full text online from Project Gutenberg 805 pp
- "Immigration to the Southern States," in the Political Science Quarterly, XX (1905), 276–97. in JSTOR
- "Blockade Running and Trade Through the Lines into Alabama, 1861-1865," South Atlantic Quarterly, IV (1905), 256–72.
- "Reorganization of the Industrial System in Alabama after the Civil War," American Journal of Sociology, X (1905), 473–99. in JSTOR
- "The Freedmen's Savings Bank," Yale Review, XV (1906), 40–67, 134–46.
- "'Pap' Singleton, The Moses of the Colored Exodus," American Journal of Sociology, XV (1910), 61-82 in JSTOR
- General W.T. Sherman as College President; A Collection of Letters, Documents, and Other Material, chiefly from private sources, relating to the life and activities of General William Tecumseh Sherman, to the early years of Louisiana State University (1912)
- "A Ku Klux Document," in the Mississippi Valley Historical Review, (1915), 1:575-78. in JSTOR
- The Sequel of Appomattox: A Chronicle of the Reunion of the States (Yale University Press: Chronicles of America series; vol. 32) (1919) online version at Project Gutenberg
- The Freedmen's Savings Bank: A Chapter in the Economic History of the Negro Race, x, 170 pp. (University of North Carolina Press: 1927; reprinted by Negro Universities Press, 1970)
- Louisiana State University, 1860-1896 (1936), 499pp
- "The Religious and Hospitable Rite of Feet Washing" (Sewanee, TN, University Press, 1908). 15 pp. Reprinted from The Sewanee Review, XVI (January, 1908), 1–13.
