= James Wilford Garner =

American political scientist (1871–1938)

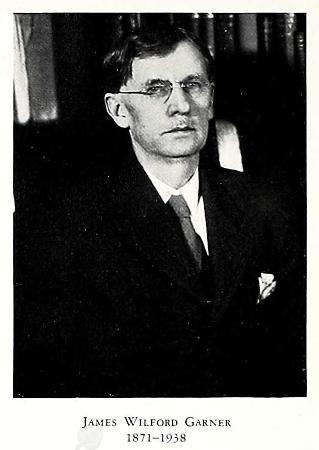
- Education: Mississippi Agricultural and Mechanical College; University of Chicago; Columbia University

James Wilford Garner (November 22, 1871 – December 9, 1938) was an American political scientist who was professor of political science at the University of Illinois.

== Early life and education ==
Garner was born on November 22, 1871, in Pike County, Mississippi, the son of W. O. Garner and Martha A. Garner.

Garner graduated from the Mississippi Agricultural and Mechanical College in 1892. He taught in Mississippi high schools from 1892 to 1896. He studied history and political science at the University of Chicago (Ph.M., 1900), after which he taught history at Bradley Polytechnic Institute.

Garner studied at Columbia University (Ph.D., 1902), where he was a member of the Dunning School. His dissertation, Reconstruction in Mississippi, though critical of Reconstruction, was regarded by W. E. B. Du Bois as the fairest of the works of the Dunning School.

== Career ==
Garner was professor of political science at the University of Pennsylvania in 1902 and 1903. He became professor of political science at the University of Illinois in 1904. He was editor in chief of the American Journal of Criminal Law and Criminology (1910–1911). He was head of the American Political Science Association in 1924.

Garner was Hyde lecturer in the French universities (1921) and Tagore lecturer in the University of Calcutta (1922). He lectured for a semester at the Graduate Institute of International and Development Studies in Geneva, Switzerland. In 1928, he lectured at New York University. In 1929, he lectured at French and English universities as a visiting professor for the Carnegie Endowment for International Peace.

Garner was awarded Chevalier of the French Legion of Honour.

== Personal life ==
In 1895, Garner married Terese Leggett. They had no children.

== Works ==
- Reconstruction in Mississippi (1901)
- The History of the United States, with Henry Cabot Lodge (four volumes, 1906)
- Introduction to Political Science (1910)
- Government in the United States, National, State, and Local (1911)
- Essays on Southern History and Politics (1914) (editor)
- Civil Government for Indian Students (1920)
- Idées et Institutions Politiques Américaines (1921)
- International Law and the World War (1920)
- Prize Law During the World War (1927)
- Political science and government (1928)
