= Historiography of slavery in the United States =

Development of historical scholarship on slavery

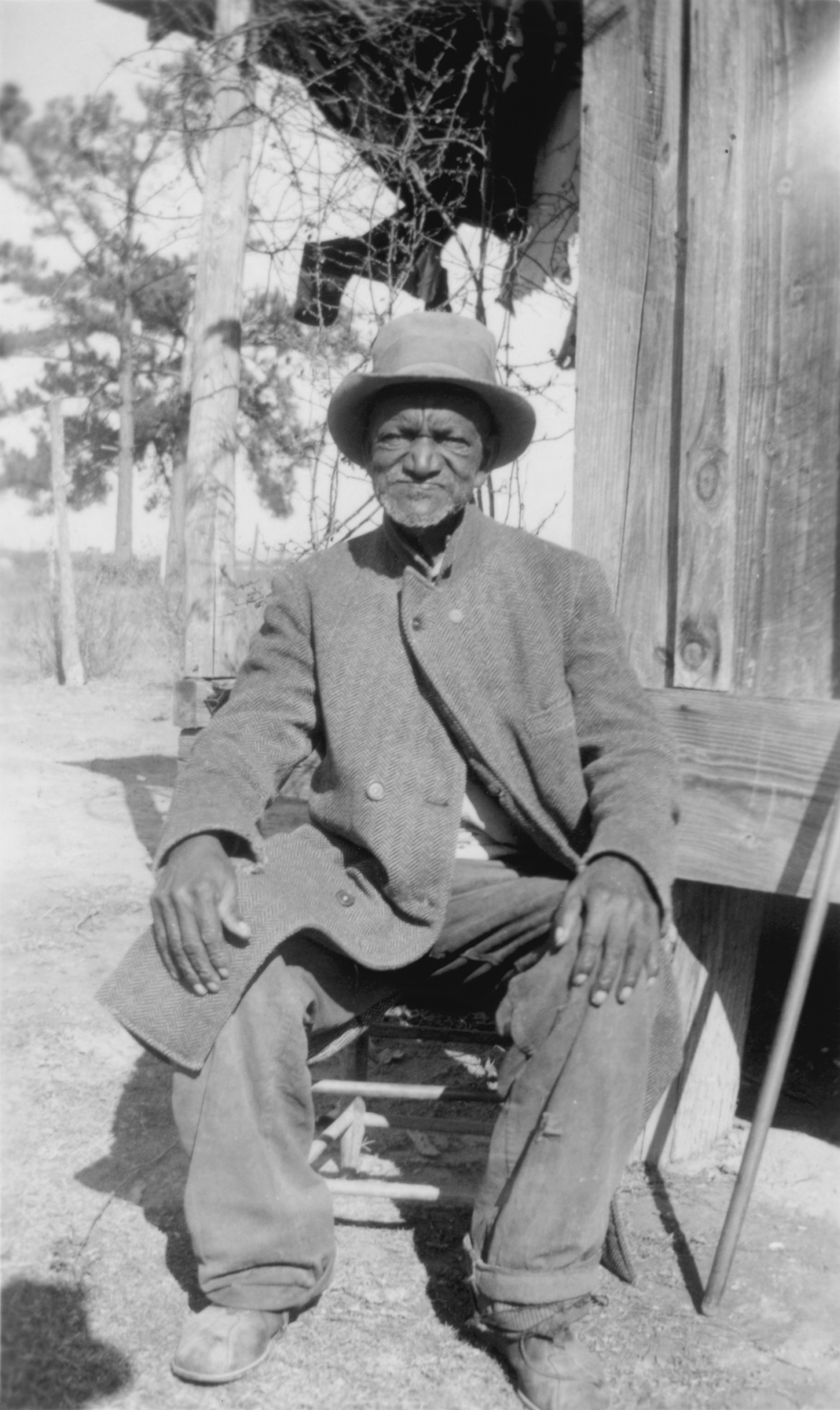
Wes Brady, ex-slave, Marshall, Texas, 1937. This photograph was taken as part of the Federal Writers' Project Slave Narrative Collection.

The historiography of slavery in the United States has undergone profound transformation over the past century. Initially historians like Ulrich B. Phillips depicted slavery as a benign institution, relying on narratives from the slaveholder perspective largely ignoring ex-slaves. However, the rise of the Civil Rights Movement in the mid-20th century catalyzed a dramatic shift in focus—from studying slavery through the lens of policy and plantation owners to exploring the lived experiences, resilience, and agency of enslaved and free Black people drawing on new sources such as slave narratives as well as integrating the scholarship of African-American historians who had been writing in journals such as the Journal of Negro History.

As the historian Herbert Gutman noted, the Phillipsian answer to what did slavery do for the slaves was that slavery lifted the slaves out of the barbarism of Africa, Christianized them, protected them, and generally benefited them. What is apparent is that Phillips over-valued Christianity while under-valuing the sophistication of west African cultures, and had a rather limited grasp of African history in general. Scholarship in the 1950s then moved to the question, what did slavery do to the slaves, and concluded it was a harsh and profitable system. More recently, scholars such as Genovese and Gutman asked, "What did slaves do for themselves?" They concluded "In the slave quarters, through family, community and religion, slaves struggled for a measure of independence and dignity.

== Post Civil War ==
In the late nineteenth century, the historiography of slavery in the United States was deeply shaped by prevailing racial ideologies and the broader political context of Reconstruction and its aftermath. Historians writing during this era, many of whom were white Southerners or sympathetic to Southern perspectives, tended to romanticize the antebellum South and portray slavery as a benign or even beneficial institution aligning with the Lost Cause narrative, which saw the Civil War as a noble struggle over states' rights rather than a conflict driven by the defense of slavery. Slaves were frequently depicted as passive, loyal, and dependent, reinforcing contemporary justifications for racial segregation and the disenfranchisement of African Americans.

== Early 20th century ==
The history of slavery was first treated seriously in mainstream history by the Southern progressive historian Ulrich B. Phillips, who largely defined the field by systematic use of plantation records and other previously unused manuscript sources, shaping the research agenda of even those succeeding scholars who disagreed with his views. He concentrated on the large plantations and largely ignored smaller and non slaveholders as well as the slaves' experience. He concluded that plantation slavery was an unprofitable economic dead end that failed to industrialize the South, that had about reached its geographical limits in 1860 and would probably have faded away without the American Civil War.

He denied that the plantation owners were brutal, arguing they provided adequate necessities. Phillips racial views were seen as providing a justification for racial segregation an attitude that carried over into the historiography of the Dunning School of Reconstruction era history, which also dominated in the early 20th century and which Eric Foner in 2005 said rested on the assumption of "negro incapacity."

At the same time that Phillips was shaping the dominant paternalist academic narrative, African-American historians were laying the groundwork for a counter-narrative that argued instead that slaves played an active role in shaping their own destinies, even within systems of oppression - an approach largely marginalized by the academic establishment. Foremost among them was Carter G. Woodson, often called the "Father of Black History.". In 1915, he co-founded the Association for the Study of Negro Life and History and launched the Journal of Negro History the following year, providing an institutional base for African-American historical scholarship. W. E. B. Du Bois was also prominent with work such as Black Reconstruction in America which emphasized both the agency of the enslaved and the revolutionary implications of their struggles.

== Mid-20th century ==
Beginning in the 1930s and 1940s, historiography moved away from the "overt" racism of the Phillips era. Historians still emphasized the slave as an object. Whereas Phillips presented the slave as the object of benign attention by the owners, historians such as Kenneth Stampp emphasized the mistreatment and abuse of the slave. David and Temin wrote, "The vantage point correspondingly shifted from that of the master to that of his slave. The reversal culminated in Kenneth Stampp's The Peculiar Institution which rejected both the characterization of blacks as a biologically and culturally inferior, childlike people, and the depiction of the white planters as paternal Cavaliers coping with a vexing social problem that was not of their own making."

Frank Tannenbaum in 1947 introduced a hemispheric perspective, which compared the condition of slaves in other parts of the Western Hemisphere such as the Caribbean and Brazil, dividing them into Anglo-Saxon, Iberian and French zones.

In his 1959 portrayal of the slave as victim Stanley Elkins compared the effects of United States slavery to that resulting from the brutality of the Nazi concentration camps. He stated the institution destroyed the will of the slave, creating an "emasculated, docile Sambo" who identified totally with the owner.

The civil rights movement of the 1950s and 1960s accelerated this transformation bringing into the mainstream both the black historical scholarship of The Journal of Negro History.

== Late 20th century ==
After the civil rights movement of the 1960s historians turned their focus away from the previous emphasis on the material well-being of the slaves to the slaves' own cultural constructs and efforts to achieve freedom.

The 1970s Economic history, Time on the Cross, portrayed slaves as having internalized the Protestant work ethic of their owners. In portraying the more benign version of slavery, they also argue in their 1974 book that the material conditions under which the slaves lived and worked compared favorably to those of free workers in the agriculture and industry of the time, also an argument of Southerners during the 19th century.

Elkins's thesis of the slave purely as a victim was challenged by Marxist historian Eugene Genovese. Genovese argued slavery was a paternalist social order built on reciprocal duties that although it constrained slaves also allowed them to build enduring cultural, religious, and familial systems that resisted total domination. Genovese also agreed with Fogel's argument that slaves' material conditions were better than many comparable workers. He was criticized for reviving elements of earlier paternalistic narratives. His most popular work Roll, Jordan, Roll which reflected the growing interest in agency among slaves. It was one of the first works to draw heavily on the Slave Narrative Collection, a set of interviews conducted with former slave interviews in the 1930s by the Federal Writers' Project in the New Deal. He reframed the history of slavery as a moral and ideological battleground where enslaved people shaped, negotiated, and occasionally subverted the planter class's control.

Other historians writing during this era include John Blassingame, Leslie Howard Owens, and Herbert Gutman. This group of historians made use of archaeological records, black folklore, and statistical data to describe a much more detailed and nuanced picture of slave life. Relying also on 19th-century autobiographies of ex-slaves (known as slave narratives) historians described slavery as the slaves experienced it. Far from slaves' being strictly victims or content, historians showed slaves as both resilient and autonomous in many of their activities. The historian James Oakes would later describe the 1970's as a Golden Age for slavery studies owning to the boom of works and the wide range of, often contradictory, views being debated.

An important development of the 1980s was the fuller integration of women into the history of race and slavery and race into the history of women. This work was preceded by the work of black club women, historic preservationists, archivists, and educators of the early twentieth century. Gerda Lerner published a significant document reader, Black Women in White America in 1972 (Pantheon Publishers). Deborah Gray White's Ar'n't I a Woman? Female Slaves in the Plantation South (1985), helped to open up analysis of race, slavery, abolitionism and feminism, as well as resistance, power, activism, and themes of violence, sexualities, and the body. The professional service and scholarship of Darlene Clark Hine, Rosalyn Terborg -Penn, and Nell Irvin Painter on African American women also broke important ground in the 1980s and 1990s.

In the 1980's the field of Atlantic history would emerge and gain popularity among American historians which impacted the study of slavery. With the Atlantic model, slavery historians began viewing American slavery as one part of the broader system of New World slavery, previous dates considered important, such as 1619, in the study of American slavery declined in interest as historians recognized that the broader Atlantic system of slavery existed for a century beforehand instead of solely English systems practiced in the modern United States.

== 21st century ==
Important work on slavery has continued; for instance, in 2003, Steven Hahn published the Pulitzer Prize-winning account, A Nation under Our Feet: Black Political Struggles in the Rural South from Slavery to the Great Migration, which examined how slaves built community and political understanding while enslaved, so they quickly began to form new associations and institutions when emancipated, including black churches separate from white control. In 2010, Robert E. Wright published a model that explains why slavery was more prevalent in some areas than others (e.g. southern than northern Delaware) and why some firms (individuals, corporations, plantation owners) chose slave labor while others used wage, indentured, or family labor instead.

Despite their exercise of autonomy and their efforts to make a life within slavery, current historians recognize the precariousness of the slave's situation. Slave children quickly learned that they were subject to the direction of both their parents and their owners. They saw their parents disciplined just as they came to realize that they also could be physically or verbally abused by their owners.

A national Marist Poll of Americans in 2015 asked, "Was slavery the main reason for the Civil War, or not?" 53% said yes and 41% said not. There were sharp cleavages along lines of region and party. In the South, 49% answered not. Nationwide 55 percent said students should be taught slavery was the reason for the Civil War.

In 2018, a conference at the University of Virginia studied the history of slavery and recent views on it. According to historian Orlando Patterson, in the United States, the profession of sociology has neglected the study of slavery.

In 2019 for the 400th anniversary of the landing of the first Africans in Virginia, The 1619 Project would be launched by the New York Times Magazine and largely contributed by Nikole Hannah-Jones with the goal of fundamentally changing the way slavery in the United States is viewed from an abberation to the fundamental reality. The work was called revisionist and was controversial upon release but had a wide impact on popular consciousness, it would be published in book form, was adapted into a miniseries, and was used in school curriculums throughout the nation.

== Sources ==
- Bennett, Lerone Jr. (2005). "Carter G. Woodson, Father of Black History". United States Department of State. Archived from the original on April 1, 2011.
- Blassingame, John W. (1972). The Slave Community: Plantation Life in the Antebellum South. New York: Oxford University Press. ISBN 0-19-502563-6.
- David, Paul A.; Temin, Peter (1974). "Slavery: The progressive institution?". Journal of Economic History. 34 (3): 739–783. doi:10.1017/S0022050700079882.
- Davis, David Brion (1974). "Slavery and the post-World War II historians". Daedalus. 103 (2): 1–16. JSTOR 20024201.
- Davis, David Brion (2006). Inhuman Bondage: The Rise and Fall of Slavery in the New World. pp. 142–160.
- Du Bois, W. E. B. (1896). The Suppression of the African Slave Trade to the United States of America: 1638–1870 (Thesis). Harvard Historical Studies, Longmans, Green, and Co.
- Du Bois, W. E. B. (1935). Black Reconstruction in America, 1860–1880. New York: Harcourt, Brace and Company.
- Elkins, Stanley M. (1959). Slavery: A Problem in American Institutional and Intellectual Life. ISBN 978-0-226-20477-2.
- Fogel, Robert William & Engerman, Stanley L. (1974). Time on the Cross: The Economics of American Negro Slavery. New York: W.W. Norton and Company. ISBN 978-0-393-31218-8.
- Foner, Eric (2013). Forever Free: The Story of Emancipation and Reconstruction. Knopf Doubleday. ISBN 978-0307834584.
- Genovese, E. D. (1968). "Materialism and Idealism in the History of Negro Slavery in the Americas". Journal of Social History. 1 (4): 371–94. doi:10.1353/jsh/1.4.371. ISSN 0022-4529.
- Genovese, Eugene (1974). Roll, Jordan, Roll: The World the Slaves Made. Vintage Books. ISBN 0-394-71652-3.
- Horton, James Oliver; Horton, Lois E. (2006). Slavery and the Making of America. Oxford University Press. ISBN 9780195304510.
- Kolchin, Peter (1993). American Slavery: 1619–1877. Farrar, Straus and Giroux. ISBN 9780809015542.
- Meier, August; Rudwick, Elliott M. (1986). Black History and the Historical Profession, 1915–80. University of Illinois Press. ISBN 978-0252012693.
- Parish, Peter J. (1990). Slavery: History and Historians. Routledge. ISBN 978-0064301824.
- Pollard, Edward A. (1866). The Lost Cause: A New Southern History of the War of the Confederates. New York: E. B. Treat and Company.
- Shaler, Nathaniel (November 1884). "The Negro Problem". The Atlantic. pp. 696–709.
- Sitkoff (Dec 1986). "Review of "Ulrich Bonnell Phillips" by Dillon". The Journal of American History. 73#3: 780. doi:10.2307/1903057. JSTOR 1903057.
- Smith, John David (1985). An Old Creed for the New South: Proslavery Ideology and Historiography, 1865-1918. Westport, CT: Greenwood Press. ISBN 0-313-23648-8.
- Stampp, Kenneth (1956). The Peculiar Institution: Slavery in the Ante-Bellum South. New York: Vintage Books. ISBN 978-0-394-70253-7.
- Tannenbaum, Frank (1947). Slave and Citizen: The Negro in the Americas. New York: Vintage Books.
- Wood, Peter H. (1975). "Review: Phillips Upside down: Dialectic or Equivocation?". Journal of Interdisciplinary History. 6 (2): 289–297. doi:10.2307/202235. JSTOR 202235.
- Woodson, Carter G (1919). The Education of the Negro prior to 1861. Washington, DC: Associated Publishers. hdl:2027/mdp.39076006056191. OCLC 593592787.
- Wright, Robert E. (2010). Fubarnomics. Buffalo, N.Y.: Prometheus.
- Wyatt-Brown, Bertram (Spring 1991). "Review of Ulrich Bonnell Phillips: A Southern Historian and His Critics by John David Smith, John C. Inscoe". Journal of the Early Republic. 11 (1). University of North Carolina Press: 140–142. doi:10.2307/3123345. JSTOR 3123345.
