= Economy of South Carolina =

Statistics
- GDP: $349.965 billion (2024)
- GDP growth: 6.9% (2024)
- GDP per capita: $63,711 (2024)
- Population below national poverty line: 13.3% (August 2024)
- Unemployment: 4.1% (May 2025)
- All values, unless otherwise stated, are in US dollars.

The economy of South Carolina was ranked the 24th largest in the United States based on gross domestic product in 2024. Tourism, centered around Myrtle Beach, Charleston, and Hilton Head Island, is the state's largest industry. The state's other major economic sector is advanced manufacturing located primarily in the Upstate and the Lowcountry.

Before rapidly industrializing in the 1950s, South Carolina primarily had an agricultural economy throughout its history. During the antebellum period, the state's economy was based almost solely on the exportation of cotton and rice cultivated using the labor of enslaved Africans. By the time of the American Revolution, the exportation of rice to Europe made the Lowcountry the wealthiest region in North America. Nonetheless, South Carolina's economic importance in the union began to decline following the Panic of 1819 and the expansion of cotton cultivation in the Old Southwest.

The profitability of cotton tied the state closer to the institution of slavery; encouraging planters to invest in more land and enslaved laborers to the detriment of economic diversification. In a failed attempt to stop the abolition of slavery, South Carolina was the first state to declare for secession following the election of Abraham Lincoln. The ensuing American Civil War brought freedom to the enslaved population as well as destruction and desolation to the state's economy.

In 1922, following a series of natural disasters and the arrival of the boll weevil in 1917, South Carolina could no longer rely on the cultivation of rice and cotton. Like many other states, the defense contracts that came with World War II and the New Deal construction policies during President Franklin D. Roosevelt's administration aided South Carolina's industrialization efforts. Starting in the 1960s, South Carolina became one of the first states to begin soliciting direct foreign investment which furthered the state's transformation away from agriculture and the textile industry.

== Early colonial economy and background ==
=== Colonial South Carolina ===
Like most American colonies, the development South Carolina relied on the West Indies as a major market for exports and imports. English settlers were originally attracted to the region by two cash crops, tobacco and sugar cane. By 1660, entrepreneurs colonized the North American coastline below the Chesapeake in order to supply Barbadian consumers with both timber and produce. The colonists (numbering 4,000 by 1690, mostly through immigration) were unable to produce commodities for European markets so they traded with Barbados for "slaves, sugar, bills of exchange, and European goods." By the 1690s, South Carolina began cultivating rice. Its centrality to the colony's economy played a similar role as tobacco did in Virginia. The demand for this new staple crop grew continuously in the succeeding decades. By 1740, rice accounted for "nearly 60 percent of total exports by value" of the lower southern colonies and nearly "10 percent of the value of all commodities shipped from British America."

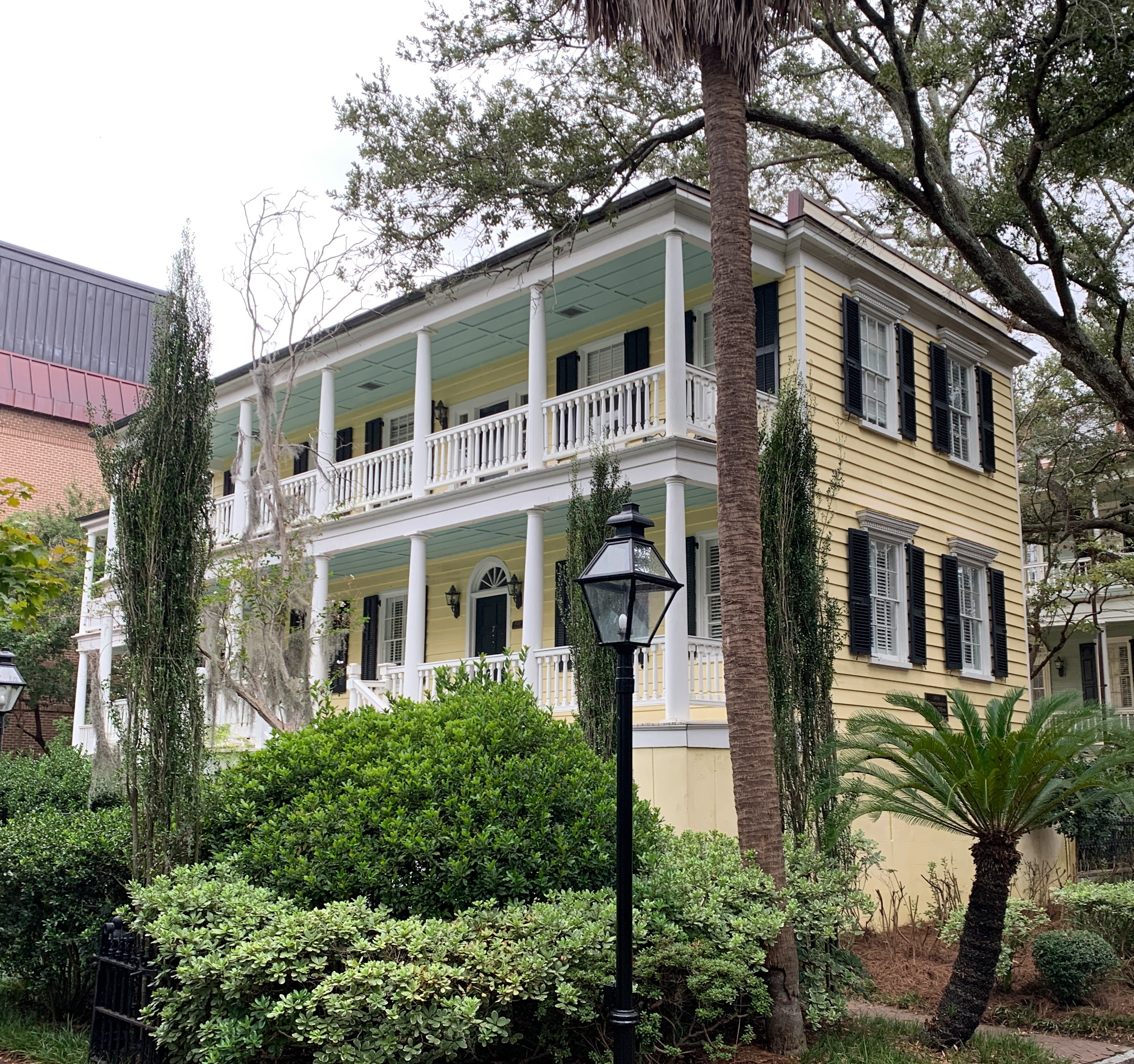
Charleston single homes were influenced by the state's Barbadian settlers.

The economy of South Carolina was relatively diverse and wealthy compared to the other colonies in the beginning of the 18th century. South Carolinian settlers exported rice and naval stores to Great Britain, traded with Native American tribes for deer skins and enslaved people, and continued their commerce with the West Indies. During this time, Charleston was the fourth largest on the continent. But rice transformed South Carolina into a rice monoculture with a growing demand for enslaved laborers in the colony's rice belt. In effect, the scalability of rice led to diversified farms being replaced by specialized plantations with a large number of enslaved workers, greater wealth alongside greater wealth inequality, the emigration of capital-less and skilled labor, and finally an increased focus on trade with Great Britain at the expense of trade with the Caribbean. It is estimated that "between 1700 and 1775, approximately 40 percent of all Africans brought to the United States entered through Charleston's harbor."

The rice plantations in the lowcountry made it the wealthiest region on the continent. The state benefited from its relationship with the British Empire. But, the restrictive efforts by the British to curtail sedition in the colonies and the rumored possibility that one of those efforts would be to encourage a slave insurrection led South Carolinians to declare for independence.

Ultimately, less is known about the economy of the lower Southern colonies (South Carolina, Georgia, and the Cape Fear portion of North Carolina) than any other section of British America. In the case of South Carolina, this may be because the rise of an elite planter class in the lowcountry along with their concentration of power was more similar to Britain's West Indian colonies than it was to the other mainland colonies.

=== Debate on the antebellum South's economic system ===
The nature of the South's slave-centered economic system during the antebellum period is still being debated by historians. The current trend in the literature is that the South had a capitalist system. According to historian Peter A. Coclanis, the study of the southern economy was revolutionized in the 1960s by Eugene Genovese who "went against the grain... that the South was ruled by a class dominated by large scale planters whose worldview was informed by the relationship between master and slave rather than by capitalist logic." Genovese's later work with his wife, Elizabeth Fox-Genovese, readily accepted a southern economy similar to the one that Frederick Law Olmsted described in A Journey in the Seaboard Slave States (1856), where poor white southerners were hesitant to work hard in fear of being looked down upon. Historian Roger Fogel critiqued this view of a paternalist system antithetical to the tenants of capitalism stating that the system was "unequivocally capitalist." Alternatively, some scholars believe that South Carolina had a "dual-economy" with large plantations fulfilling the commercial activities required of capitalism while the region's yeomen farmers fulfilled the needs of a more traditional sector.

=== Slave society ===
The enslavement of people from Africa was central to antebellum South Carolina's economy. The demand for enslaved laborers in the state initially increased in the 1790s in response to an ephemeral tobacco bonanza, further expansion into the state's backcountry, and an increased demand for cotton. In 1822, following the purported Denmark Vesey led slave rebellion, and what South Carolinians perceived to be a rising abolitionist sentiment in the North, attitudes toward slavery began to change. Essentially, it was no longer seen as a necessary evil but a positive good. According to historian Ira Berlin, in the nineteenth century, South Carolina "became a slave society rather than simply a society that held slaves." In the 1830s, South Carolina was the only state where a majority of white citizens owned slaves. (Note: However, according to Bass and Poole, those in the minority still benefited from the institution through the process of hiring out.)

The once flourishing intellectual life of Charleston (which at the turn of the nineteenth century had the nation's premier natural history museum and the largest bookstore south of Philadelphia) began to wither as the state's intellectuals spent their energy defending the institution of slavery instead of writing on other subjects. Additionally slave owning became a widely recognized symbol of respectability.

According to historian Gavin Wright, fellow historians often try to explain the "rise, spread, and persistence of slavery in terms of advantages in productivity" which he believes is peripheral to understanding why the institution was central to the commerce of the southern region. According to Wright, the answer to slavery's centrality is the concept of property rights. The ownership of enslaved black laborers allowed slave owners to deploy labor in areas where white laborers would not go. Additionally, it allowed the slave owner to be mobile, to leave old land for land more advantageous to the cultivation of cotton. For the majority of white slaveowners in the state of South Carolina, the property value of their slaves increased decade to decade. (Note: During the 1820s, malaria in the lowcountry caused slave births to rarely exceed deaths. In contrast, upcountry planters could rely on the value of their increased slave holdings constituting over 10 percent of their average income.) In the upcountry from 1850 to 1860, the total value of personal property, which was mainly slave property, increased from almost $65 million to $185 million. The continual increase in value of enslaved laborers further solidified the practice within the state.

=== Country-republicanism ===
South Carolina's form of republicanism ideology termed "country-republicanism" by historian Lacy K. Ford Jr. effected how people in the state thought about commerce and the economy. Within the state, political thought was distinctly homogeneous. Citizens believed that independence was to be vigorously reinforced by a disengaged government, that all industries were concomitant to agriculture, and that economic sovereignty was crucial for political sovereignty. The practice of slavery influenced these ideals. Enslavement was seen as an alternative possibility for men who had their economic activity circumscribed. The use of enslaved black laborers was seen as egalitarian for whites. Furthermore, it made the concept of diligent work bringing about economic mobility incompatible with the distinction between the enslaved labor of black people and the aristocratic rule of the white planters.

== Agricultural staple crops ==
=== Tobacco ===
There were three periods of major tobacco cultivation in South Carolina. The crop was first planted near Charles Town in the 1670s where it became a major crop for twenty years until the lowcountry transitioned to rice. Tobacco reemerged in the 1780s in the state's backcountry. This second period of growth peaked in 1799 when South Carolina exported about ten million pounds of tobacco. Finally, the last large-scale planting of tobacco began in the Pee Dee region during the 1880s.

The second period of major tobacco cultivation spurred major internal improvements due to the transportation needs of the bulky product's growers. After South Carolina produced 2.6 million pounds of tobacco in 1783, four times the amount produced a decade earlier, Governor William Moultrie called for a special legislative session the following year which resulted in the state improving roads, building bridges, and digging canals in order to improve the tobacco's pathway.

The period of cultivation in the Pee Dee was by far the largest and most important. By 1880, the region had fallen into penury. The land prices in the area had been cut in half and the agricultural market was in a dismal state following the Civil War. The development of bright leaf tobacco in the production of cigarettes drastically increased the demand for the staple outside of the old tobacco belt and farmers began planting it again in the region. In 1880, South Carolina grew less tobacco than the amount needed to fill a single boxcar. But, from 1890 to 1899, South Carolina's tobacco production increased from 200,000 pounds a year to 20 million. (Note: The three Pee Dee counties which accounted for almost 75% of the state's tobacco production were Marion, Darlington, and Florence) The tobacco boom encouraged more commerce and banking, greatly increased real estate prices, and enticed railroad companies to extend their lines into the region which integrated the region with the state.

=== Cotton ===
Long one of South Carolina's cash crops, indigo became unprofitable following the Revolutionary War and was gradually phased out in the lowcountry sea islands with sea cotton. The fine, long-staple cotton which was only capable of being grown in South Carolina became the area's dominant crop for a century and further tied the region to slavery. (Note: The superfine varieties were all cultivated in the sea islands south of Charleston) By the turn of the nineteenth century, mostly British-bound sea cotton made up 20% of the country's cotton exports. From 1800 to 1820 a series of agricultural insights such as moving planting from highland to lowland fields and the reclamation of suitable salt marches increased the quality and quantity of the crop. (Note: Kovacik states that the industry focused largely on Edisto Island and St. Helena Island) While the cotton grown in the upcountry had stints of overproduction, the luxury cotton grown in the lowcountry sea islands had a separate market was largely unaffected by the latter's overproduction.

Cotton cultivation was only profitable near the coast until the 1790s when the demand for cotton caused by technological breakthroughs in Britain and the Haitian revolution led to the cultivation of short-staple cotton in the upcountry. (Note: The reason for this movement is often credited to Eli Whitney's cotton gin but Gavin Wright states that "appreciating the protracted character of the transition to cotton as the dominant southern cash crop leads to the realization that the process was largely by demand.") This type of cotton, which had a green instead of black seed, was of an inferior quality compared to sea cotton. However, it could be grown easily in the Savannah River Valley and followed similar cultivation methods as tobacco which was the region's initial cash crop. (Note: Lacy K. Ford, Jr. calls the Savannah River Valley and other portions of the lower Piedmont the "heartland of the South's first short-staple cotton boom.") By 1811, 30 million pounds of the short-staple variety were exported from the state and by 1860 that number had doubled to 60 million. The prosperity from 1816 to 1819 with its low interest rates and high inflation encouraged upstate citizens to move investments from the textile manufacturing industry back into cotton which resulted in an economy that in 1819 was "almost entirely based on agriculture" according to historian William Freehling.

The prices for cotton ebbed and flowed throughout the nineteenth century. Following currency contraction after the Panic of 1819, the upcountry of South Carolina suffered an economic depression for the majority of the 1820s. The state would never recover its economic power relative to the other states. Prosperity returned to the region from 1833 to 1836 until the Panic of 1837 dealt the cotton market a blow it wouldn't recover from until the late 1840s. After Mississippi and Alabama became the heartland of America's cotton industry, the South Carolina upcountry accounted for just 5% of the nations cotton output. The economic depression of the 1840s exacerbated upcountry emigration and spurred an economic diversification movement. During the transportation revolution of the 1850s, the cotton market became flush again in the upcountry. The expansion of banking, planters shifting their business to local merchants, and the formation of robust towns in the region coincided with an increase in the price of cotton. As more profit than ever was made from cotton and its cultivation depleted the state's soil, the movement to diversify the economy came to a standstill and the price for enslaved laborers almost tripled.

== Antebellum commerce and governance ==
=== Merchant class ===
In antebellum South Carolina trade was considered secondary to agriculture. Towns were reliant on nearby plantations and farms for business while planters could mostly rely on themselves for food and clothing if needed. In some districts, every farm was recorded as self-sufficient. But, in many areas of South Carolina, merchants were still needed in order to provide planters with credit which was an essential in a cash-poor region. Inland merchants were relatively rare compared to farmers until the middle of the nineteenth century. They extended credit to planters for the purchase of commodities such as coffee, sugar, and salt. The most common item sold was alcohol and sales seldom exceeded a couple of dollars. Toward the latter part of the antebellum period, merchants in the southwestern portion of the state began advocating for and receiving significant concessions from the general assembly such as the incorporation of towns, tax breaks to encourage development, and infrastructure to connect markets. These concessions often put the town merchants at odds with their rural counterparts. By the 1850s, commercial activity was no longer centered on just Charleston and began expanding in the upcountry.

According to historians Jack Bass and W. Scott Poole, before the Panic of 1819 "dealt South Carolina a blow from which it never recovered" Charleston had trailed only New York in the value of its imports. During the antebellum period planters in Charleston were reliant on imports for building materials and food. The steamboat revolution of the 1820s enervated South Carolina's famous wagon trade and allowed the East Bay merchants to control trade. The mercantile power of Charleston (and therefore the state) began to decline in the 1820s relatively compared to the trade in the ports of New York, New Orleans, and Mobile. (Note: Largely due to the building of the Erie Canal in New York and the steamboat's effect on the Mississippi River trade) But, by the end of the 1830s permanent residents of the state managed Charleston's mercantile endeavors for the first time ever. (Note: Previously, these interests were controlled by citizens of the North who left (and spent their money elsewhere) in the summer in order to avoid catching Yellow Fever.)

=== Internal improvements ===
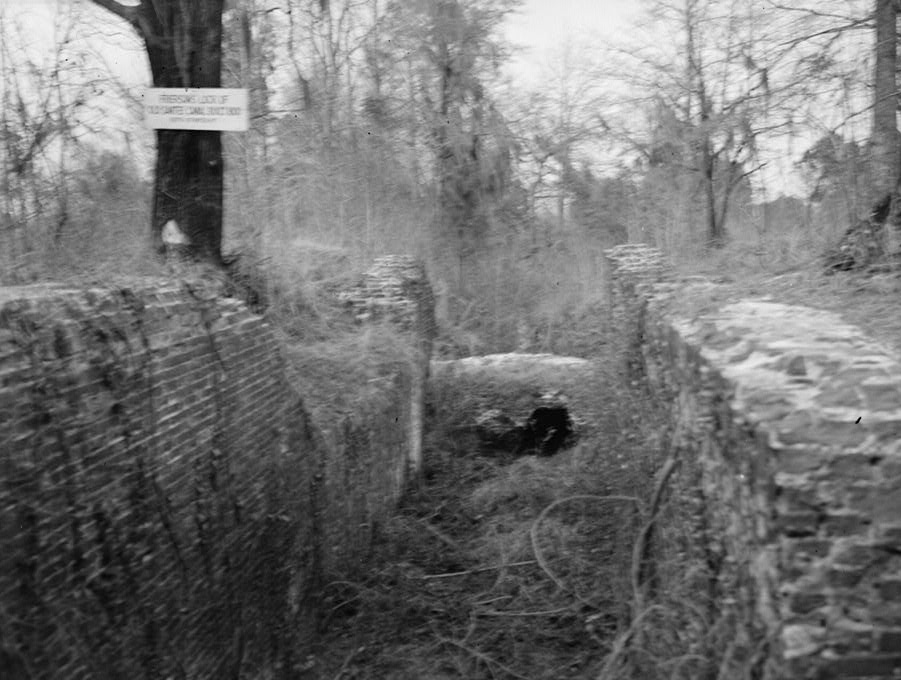
A portion of the Santee Canal

Shortly after the American Revolution the state legislature of South Carolina was one of the first states to attempt internal improvements on a large scale. However, due to several geographic problems these plans largely failed. First, the nature of the state's swift and rapid-rising streams prevented effective water transportation at the time. Secondly, the state's mountains in the northwest prevented widespread commerce with Georgia and because the state's merchants already dealt readily with Europe there was no demand for the construction of public works connecting the two states. (Note: According to Conger, North Carolina offered relatively little which South Carolina didn't produce itself.)

In 1818, the state created the Board of Internal Improvements and allocated $1 million for the construction of a series of roads and canals connecting towns in the upcountry to Charleston through the fall line. The board was abolished in 1822 after a disappointed legislature received reports detailing how the construction projects were under schedule and over budget. Under a newly appointed superintendent, the projects received a steady supply of capital from the state legislature over the next six years despite mounting criticism. However, the fast waters of the upcountry streams proved to be too strong for the canals and by 1840 the majority of the canals were derelict.

Lamenting the loss of bales of cotton from South Carolina to the Augusta and Savannah markets, Charleston businessmen sought and received a charter for the creation of the South Carolina Canal & Railroad Company (SCC&RR) in 1827. The company was slow to gain support and issues quickly arose with the right of eminent domain given to the company. While the state legislature did not explicitly give the company the right of eminent domain in the charter, they did give the company the power to force citizens to sell their land if unable to come to an agreement. The price of the land would be determined by a commission; a development in South Carolina law which previously hadn't compensated citizens for land if it was needed for public use.

By the 1840s, the line connected the inland port of Hamburg along with Charleston to the fall line regions of the upcountry. At the time, it was the largest line of railroad in the world under a single management and the first successful internal improvement in the state besides the Santee Canal. Success was limited and financial woes led the SCC&RR to merge with the Louisville, Cincinnati and Charleston Railroad Company to form the South Carolina Railroad Company in 1843. The newly formed company extended into the upcountry which had previously relied on river barges and wagon traffic to move the region's cotton. In the beginning of the 1850s, the state began providing subsidies to a number of railroad projects. These subsidies were outside of the state's revolving fund which had been established in 1847 to fund railroad aid. In 1848, the South Carolina Railroad Company owned the only railroad line in the state consisting of 248 miles but by 1860, South Carolina had eleven railroads with an accumulative 1000 miles of track.

The one glaring failure during this period of railroad expansion was the Blue Ridge Railroad. South Carolinians had long dreamed of connecting the port of Charleston to the northwest with a tramontane railroad route. In 1852, the Blue Ridge Railroad was chartered to fulfill that dream. Over a span of six years, the state legislature purchased $2.5 million in stock, hoping to spur investment. But, unlike previous railroad companies, the Blue Ridge Railroad never had significant private investment. The failure of the company to raise money without the aid of the state legislature and the high cost of digging a one-mile-long tunnel through Stump House Mountain resulted in the company being dissolved in 1859.

=== Banking ===
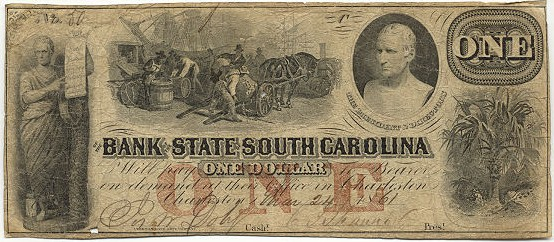
Paper currency from the Bank of the State of South Carolina

In 1712, the first bank in South Carolina was chartered in Charleston. It stayed in commission until it was destroyed during the Revolutionary War. Almost two decades would follow until the newly formed state government of South Carolina chartered the Bank of South Carolina in 1792. Then in 1812, the legislature chartered an additional bank with a similar name called the Bank of the State of South Carolina (BSSC) which was the state's financial arm. The BSSC received all taxes, negotiated any necessary loans for the state, and paid the state's expenses. Any profits were used to pay off public debt. By 1820 there were five banks in Charleston which all had capital close to $1 million.

Because all of the state's private banks were located in Charleston for most of the antebellum period, a medium of exchange was scarce in regions outside of Charleston. These regions relied on dollars from Georgia or North Carolina if they were in circulation. Although there were increasing demands for banking services in the South Carolina interior in the 1820s, the state legislature rarely authorized the chartering of any new banks or the expansion of the BSSC which only had branches in Charleston, Georgetown, Camden, and Columbia at the time. The President of the BSSC, Stephen Elliot, argued for innovative banking practices, such as breaking paper money away from specie, but in actuality he ran one of the most conservative banking institutions in the country. Historian William Freehling called the BSSC "essentially a restricted agricultural loan office" because its funds were largely tied up in long-term agricultural mortgages. Ultimately, the lack of access to short-term loans in the state's interior stifled growth.

During the upcountry cotton boom of the 1830s, the area was largely reliant on capital from the Bank of the United States and the Bank of England which made it particularly vulnerable to the Panic of 1837. The area did not have a bank until 1852. The BSSC also established five agencies in the region in the 1850s. Unlike the BSSC during the 1820s, the newly opened banks and agencies in the upcountry devoted more of their resources to supporting commercial activity than to the provision of agricultural mortgages.

== The beginnings of industrialization ==
=== Antebellum manufacturing ===
Interest and support for manufacturing in the state depended on how well the cotton industry was doing. Decades with relatively low cotton prices, such as the 1840s, had a flurry of manufacturing activity. But in boom times, such as the 1850s, manufacturing was largely an afterthought in the public consciousness. While, the state primarily produced rice and cotton for the entire antebellum period, Charleston was still one of the South's manufacturing centers. Within the city were an array of industries consisting of lumber and rice mills, railway car factories, and iron foundries. Manufacturing in Charleston was at its peak in 1858 with a total capitalization possibly worth $3 million. (Note: According to Lander, a series of fires from 1858 to 1861 resulted in the loss of close to a quarter of a million dollars of capital which made Charleston's position as the third largest southern manufacturing contested) The city's foundries were particularly successful, selling products to virtually every southern state. Furthermore, no state milled anywhere near the amount of rice as South Carolina did. By the 1860s, a number of industries in the city such as the lumber mills and ship yards were declining and attempts at textile manufacturing within the city had for the most part failed.

The state's specialization in staple crops led it to lag behind the northern states in manufacturing. In 1860, the North's leading manufacturing state, Pennsylvania, had a combined capitalization of $190 million while South Carolina's capitalization was a mere $10.5 million. For most of the antebellum period, the short supply of capital hindered the establishment of factories within the state. Additionally, the enterprises were rarely successful because the men with the capital to invest would never fully commit themselves to the business. The state simply couldn't build the skilled workforce necessary to be competitive with the North. During the late 1830s, the state hosted several commercial conventions, held in Augusta and Charleston, where delegates from the state's various regions sought to increase investment in manufacturing and the European trade. But, despite the banking capital in the state having doubled from 1831 to 1836, the state still lacked the capital needed to undertake a large-scale diversification effort.

==== Textile industry ====
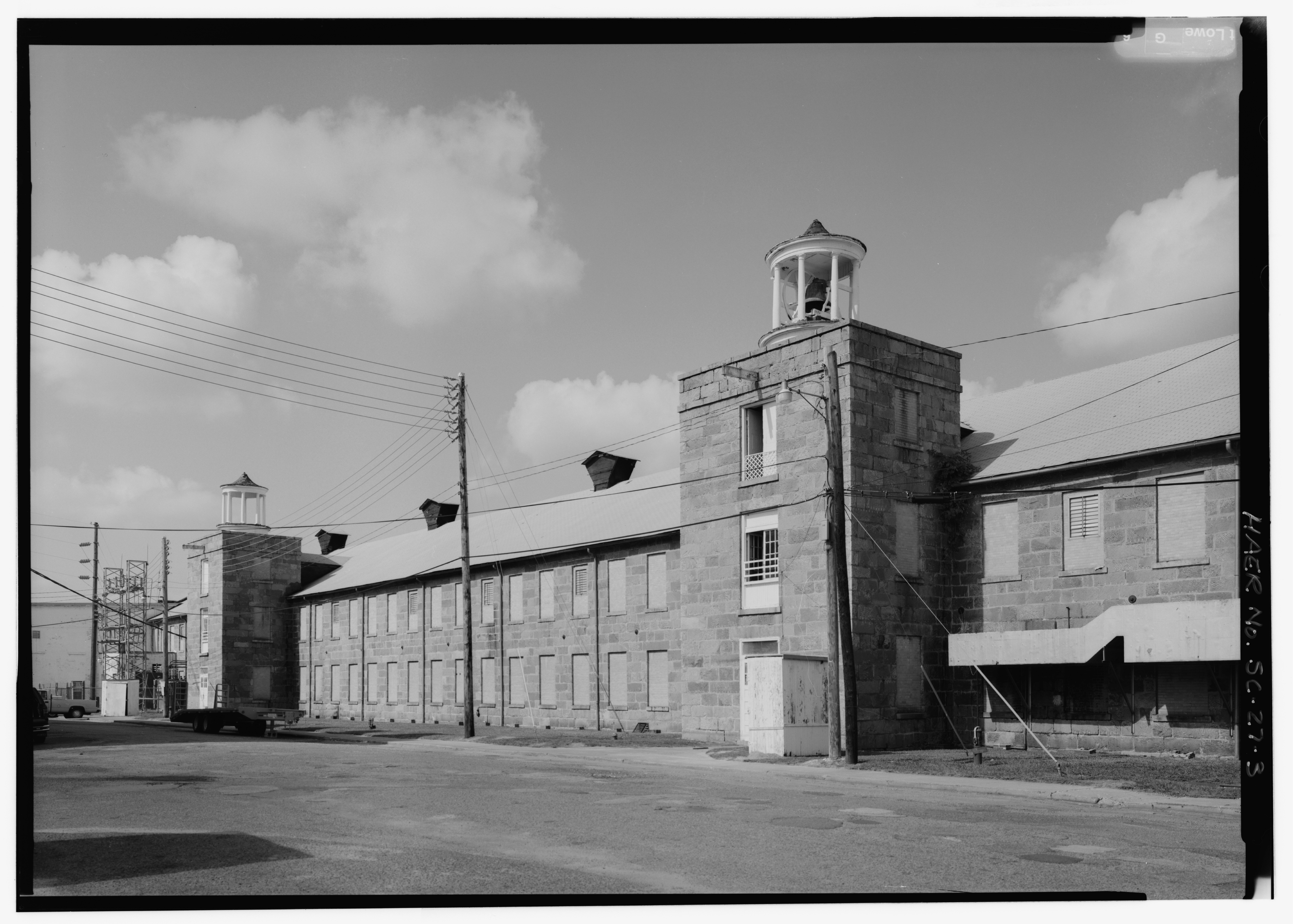
The Graniteville Mill in Aiken County

Due to the state's plethora of cotton fields, textile mills sprang up throughout the state during the colonial and antebellum periods. For the most part, these mills made low-quality cotton homespun products which were purchased locally to clothe enslaved laborers. Until the Vaucluse Mill was established in 1833 very few of these mills lasted long. For the most part, at the beginning of the nineteenth century, the state's political leaders, such as John C. Calhoun and Langdon Cheves, believed that enslaved labor was more profitable when used to cultivate cotton rather than when used to weave it.

The South's premier manufacturer at the time, William Gregg, changed the industry when he opened the Graniteville Mill in 1847. By 1880, the mill had 24,264 spindles (over 25 percent of the spindles in South Carolina) and was profitably selling fine cotton products to the North. The company owned the housing that the workers lived in, a practice that became commonplace throughout the state, and Gregg expected the workers to live virtuously according to his own standards.

Until the 1840s, most mills used enslaved labor. From the 1850s to the early 1900s, the textile industry predominantly employed white women and children. According to historian Kari Frederickson mill villages such as the one found in Graniteville were avoided, especially after dark, by African Americans. Between 1880 and 1920, as northeastern textile manufacturers attracted by the state's anti-union sentiment moved to the Piedmont, the number of spindles in the state grew 36-fold and the number of mills jumped from twelve to 184.

== War and economic recovery ==
South Carolina's economy was devastated following the Civil War. Just like the other states in the Confederacy, South Carolina was plagued with financial problems ranging from an inability to sell cotton to Britain, depreciated currency, and food shortages (famously resulting in a bread riot in Columbia). The state's infrastructure and cities were in ruins, Sherman's army torched Columbia, and Charleston sustained bombardment from Morris Island for 587 days. Most importantly, the enslaved laborers which the state's planters had invested heavily in, were freed.

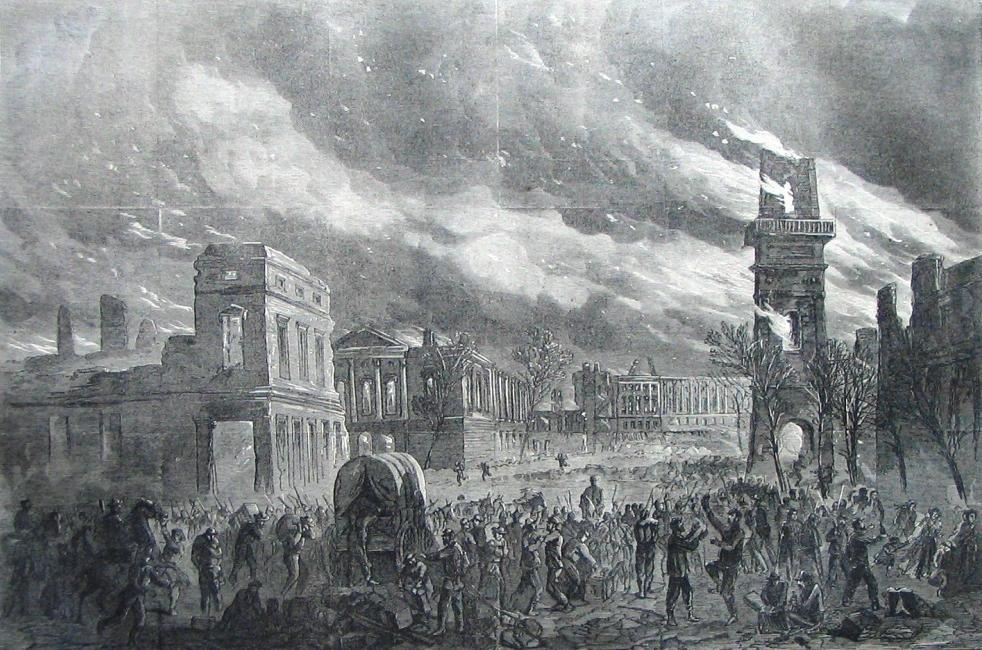
The burning of Columbia in 1865

In 1865, not long after the war's end, John Richard Dennett traveled through South Carolina writing a series of articles for The Nation describing the state's condition. He traveled to Columbia on the state's neglected highways as well as the state's railroad system which he described as "very slow to recover from Sherman's visitation." Once in the capital, he found his surroundings to be "ruins and silent desolation." On the sea islands in Beaufort County, Dennett described the process through which the county's large plantations were sold; either to northerners after tax proceedings or split into separate, smaller lots and sold to freed-people. Significant landownership among the freed-people, a result of the Port Royal Experiment, was unique but temporary in the state.

Agriculture in South Carolina
Product	1860	1870
Cotton, _{bales of.}	353,412	224,500
Rice, _{pounds of.}	119,100,528	32,304,825
Corn, _{bushels of.}	15,065,606	7,614,207
Wheat, _{bushels of.}	1,285,631	783,619
Tobacco, _{pounds of.}	104,412	38,805
Cash value of livestock.	23,934,465	12,443,510
Cash value of farms.	139,652,508	44,808,763

=== Agriculture and industry after the Civil War ===
In the lowcountry, the first emergent industry during Reconstruction was phosphate mining. Starting in the late 1860s, planters mined phosphate for the creation of fertilizer using labor from the South Carolina Penitentiary's inmate-leasing program as well as freed-people. As phosphate mining appeared, the state's rice industry was struggling. In 1866, the Freedmen's Bureau conducted a survey which found that almost all of the plantations in Charleston had been abandoned by planters during the war. By 1868, fewer than 43 of the 52 rice plantations along the Cooper River were in operation. In 1885, South Carolina supplied half of the world's phosphate. However, the 1886 Charleston earthquake and a pronounced increase in phosphate from other Southern states brought the fledgling industry to an end. From 1893 to 1911, the rice industry received a deathblow from a series of hurricanes which effectively ended large-scale rice cultivation in the state. During this time, Charleston was one of the poorest towns in the region.

Shortly thereafter, the arrival of the boll weevil in 1917 devastated the state's cotton farms. By 1921, the sea cotton trade was almost nonexistent. As a consequence of the collapse of the cotton industry, nearly half of the state's banks closed, with shares of cotton mills in 1929 being sold at half the price they were a few years prior. The onset of the Great Depression worsened conditions, leading to cotton being sold below the cost of production.

Attempting to revive Charleston's moribund economy, Charleston city officials attempted to brand the city the "Ellis Island of the South." Additionally, officials opened the South Carolina Inter-State and West Indian Exposition, which was created to mirror the World's Columbian Exposition. The exposition was ultimately a financial failure. While, the city's new Immigration Station, later renamed the Immigration Center, received just a single shipload of immigrants during the city's period of solicited immigration.

Agriculture outside of the lowcountry fared better during this period. World War I doubled the price and production of tobacco in South Carolina. The increased demand sustained the Pee Dee region throughout the war's duration but the boom days came to an end with the war. The state's tobacco industry lingered until New Deal tobacco policies implemented in the 1930s made tobacco production profitable once again.

=== New Deal ===
The Great Depression of the 1930s was ruinous for the already struggling state's economy. The Federal Emergency Relief Administration provided a quarter of the state's citizens with relief in 1933. That year, Charleston's unemployment reached 20 percent. The area was lacking more than just jobs; a 1934 federal survey found "Charleston's housing facilities to be the worst in the nation." More than 100 structures were built in the state from New Deal policies including Hunting Island State Park, the McKissick Museum, and a large portion of the Citadel's campus.

The largest project in the state (and among the largest in the nation) was the Santee Cooper hydroelectric and flood-control project which created both Lake Moultrie and Lake Marion. In 1930, only 3% of rural farms and homes in South Carolina had electricity. Santee Cooper provided many rural areas of the state with electricity and was a catalyst for economic development in South Carolina.

=== World War II defense contracts ===
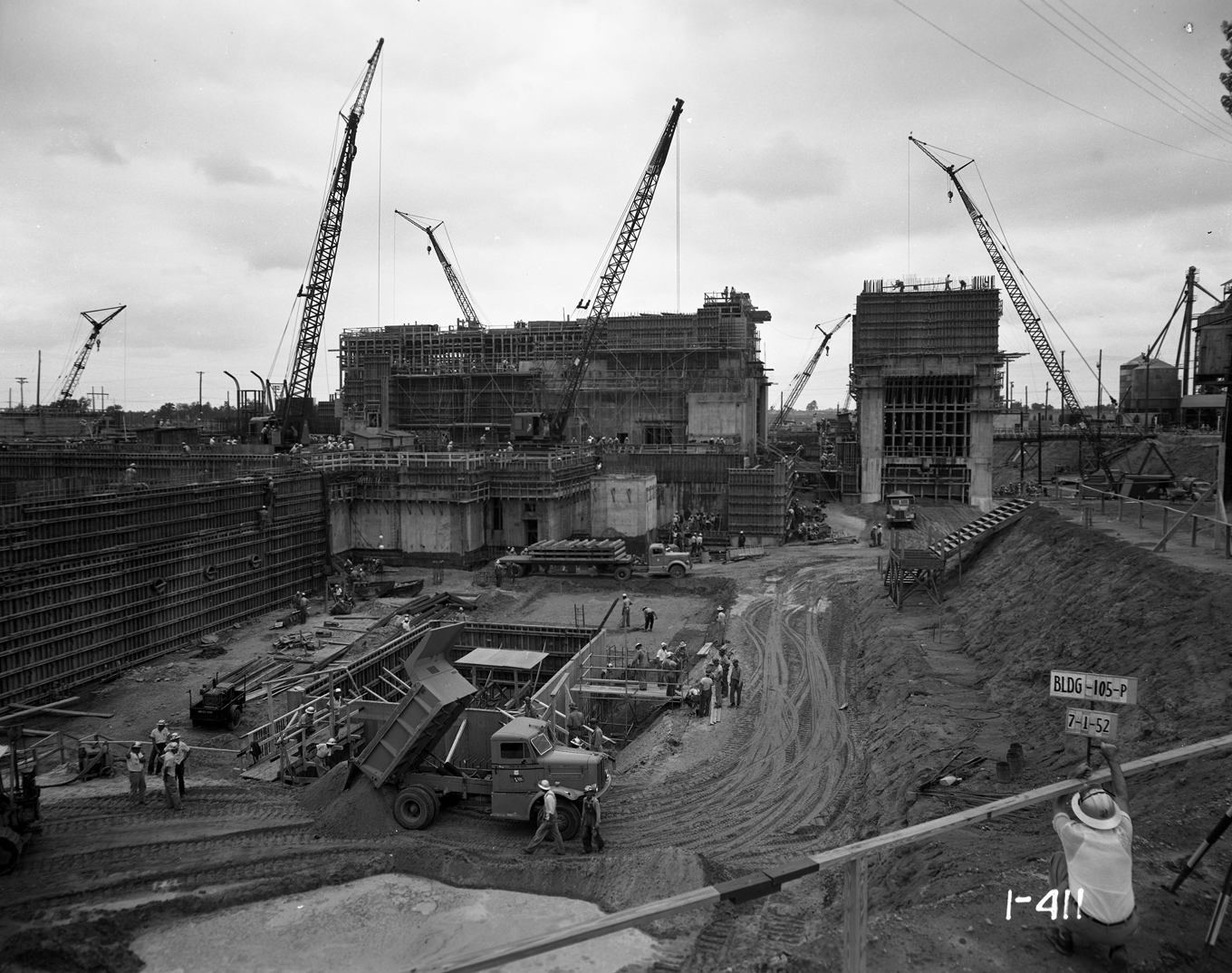
Construction of the Savannah River Site

South Carolina was awarded a contract for a naval yard in 1890. In 1901, after the navy purchased land just north of Charleston, construction on the first dry dock began. Initially the naval yard focused on repairing and supplying ships. But, in 1910, workers on the naval yard began constructing several cutters, gunboats, and submarine chasers. In 1917, on the precipice of the country's entry into World War I, there were around 1,700 employees working on the naval yard. This number would almost triple to 5,600 at its peak during WWI.

Employment at the yard fell significantly after the end of WWI. Throughout the 1920s and early 1930s the Navy sporadically considered closing the naval yard. But, the naval yard was designated a construction yard in 1933 which expanded the workforce to 2,400. WWII had an even bigger effect on the area than its predecessor. At its peak in 1944, the shipyard employed 26,000 people effectively creating the city of North Charleston surrounding it. The U.S. Army's training facility, Camp Croft, had a similar economic effect in Spartanburg at the time.

=== Cold War economic development and military installations ===
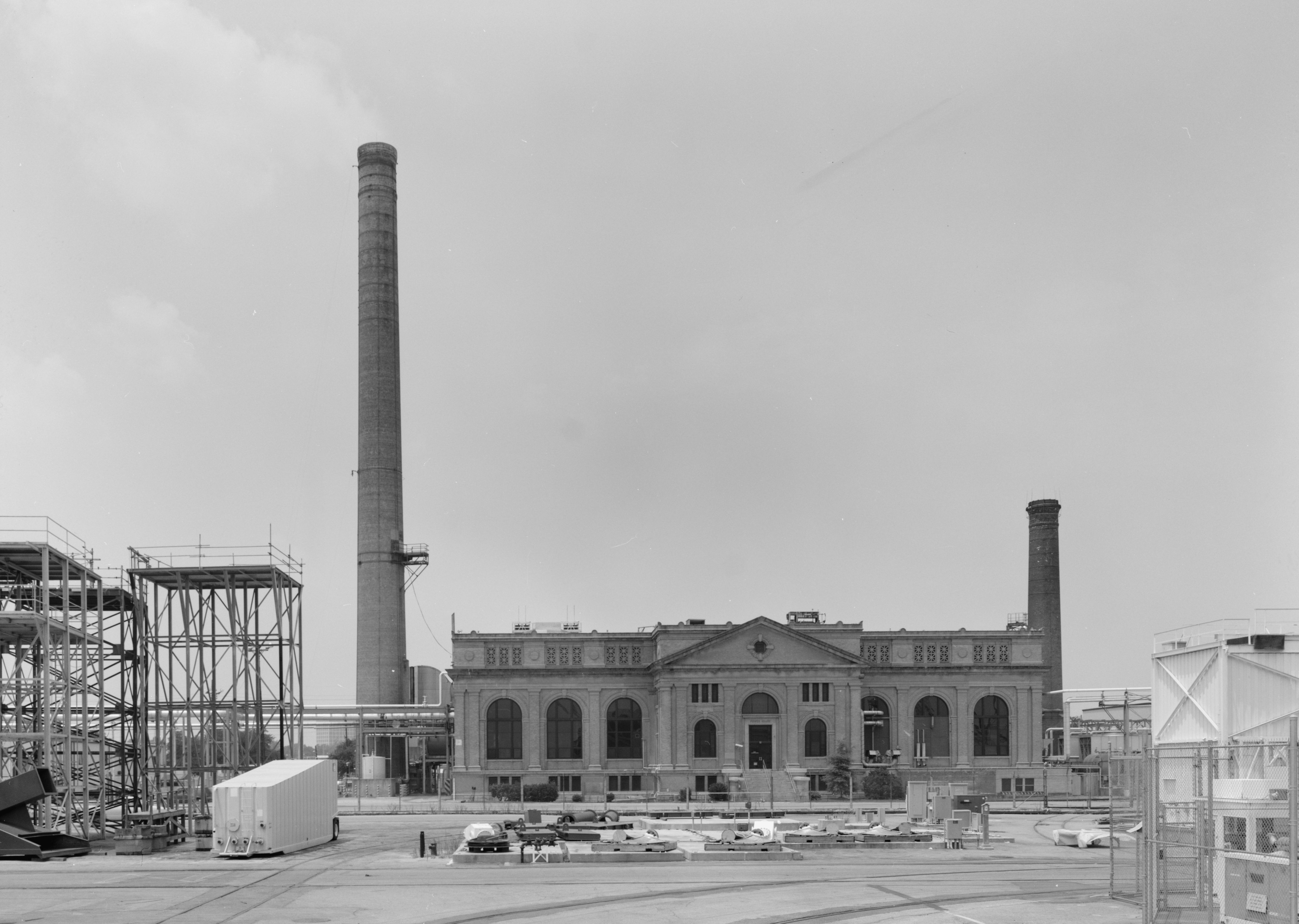
A building on the U.S. Naval Base in Charleston

Due to several factors following World War II the state's social structure was in flux. The mill villages which had defined life for many South Carolinians were disappearing as textile companies consolidated, the civil rights movement threatened the state's culture of white supremacy, and the state underwent a populist political transformation led by Strom Thurmond and Olin D. Johnston. The century-old conflict in South Carolina between the urban and rural regions of the state ended as industrial activities surpassed farms in the state. The years following the war were prosperous for the nation but particularly for South Carolina; from 1945 to 1954, South Carolina's economy grew faster than the national average. (Note: Maunula states that the finance, insurance, and finance markets in South Carolina grew 133 percent compared to the national average growth rate of 36 percent.) South Carolina's industrial base and the per capita income of its citizens expanded significantly in the 1950s as capital and managerial talent migrated to the state, particularly to the Piedmont region. From 1950 to 1955, the average per capita income in the state increased thirty percent. Despite the fact that in 1955, the halcyon days of the textile industry were beginning to wane and the state's agricultural industries had been rapidly declining throughout the post-war period, South Carolina's economy remained one of the fastest growing throughout the 1950s and early 1960s.

Due in large part to U.S. Representative Mendal Rivers who helped secure a new coast guard district in Charleston and the construction of a twelve-billion-dollar navy hospital in Beaufort, the post-war military reductions were smaller in South Carolina than most other states in the country. In 1945, the navy reorganized its activities in Charleston with the creation of the Charleston Naval Base. When it closed in 1996, the base was the largest employer of civilians in the state and responsible for a third of Charleston's economy. The base is now abandoned but plans are underway to make it a Coast Guard superbase.

In the early 1950s, the federal government built the Savannah River Plant (SRP) to create materials for hydrogen bombs. The plant, located on 306 miles of land, was the largest construction project in the history of the country at the time. During construction, up to 40,000 workers were employed by the SRP resulting in increased wages throughout the region. Civil rights groups fought for equal employment opportunities at the plant. In the 1950s, the vast majority of African Americans in the state worked in agriculture because the textile industry was dominated by whites. The jobs the SRP created in western South Carolina enabled many of that area's white citizens to enter the middle class. But, African Americans whom made up 20% of the plant's workforce almost all worked as common day laborers. In the 1990s, the plant was renamed the Savannah River Site (SRS). According to the SRS it is now an "industrial complex responsible for disposition of nuclear materials, waste management, environmental cleanup and environmental stewardship" with an annual budget of $2 billion and a workforce of almost 11,000.

South Carolina is home to eight military installations including Joint Base Charleston and Fort Jackson. The University of South Carolina Darla Moore School of Business estimated that in 2017 the eight military installations in the state had a combined total economic impact of $24.1 billion.

== Modern economy ==
As manufacturing, travel services, and real estate became South Carolina's strongest private sectors, new residents were attracted to the state reversing a 150-year-old trend of population loss due to emigration. The growth of the manufacturing industry is particularly strong. Between 2010 and 2018, largely thanks to the plethora of foreign automotive manufacturing companies located in the upstate, the state's advanced manufacturing employment doubled. The largest industry in the state, tourism, greatly influences the real estate and finance sectors and is located almost entirely on South Carolina's coast. While, the poorest counties in the state are found in the upper Pee Dee region and the counties along the Savannah River near the Savannah River Site.

=== South Carolina State Ports Authority ===
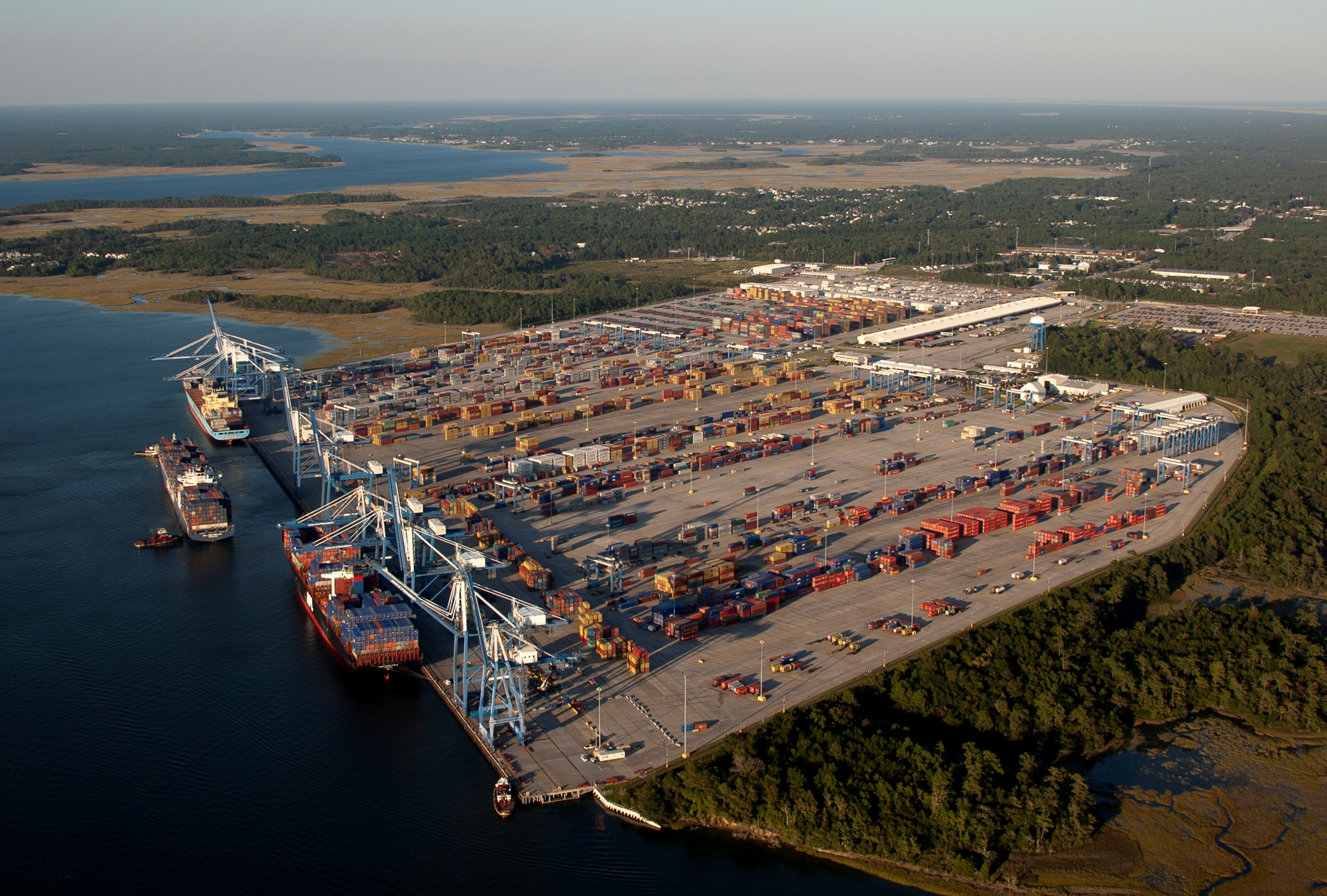
Aerial photo of the Wando Welch Terminal

The South Carolina Port Authority (SCPA), chartered in 1942 by the state legislature, owns and operates the state's public seaport facilities as well as the inland ports in Greer and Dillon. The ports in Charleston and Georgetown were in operation before the American Revolution. From the 1970s to the early 2000s, the port was among the most active on the East Coast. However, the failure of an expansion on Daniel Island stifled its growth significantly. Nonetheless, between 2010 and 2020, the ports cargo base grew by 5.4 percent a year. In order to better service the state, SCPA opened two inland ports in Greer and Dillon. Inland Port Greer opened in 2013, and supports the upstate's automotive cluster. Inland Port Dillon opened in 2018, and connects the Pee Dee region to Charleston and the Southeast. The Port of Charleston is one of the busiest ports in North America but the fast-silting Port of Georgetown has been effectively decommissioned due to the financial costs of further dredging it.

Described as a "small but busy regional operation" in the 1980s, the Port of Charleston has grown alongside the booming population in the Southeast. Between 1976 and 1986, the ports in Charleston and Savannah grew 20% while every other American port along the Atlantic Ocean declined. Due to the Port of Charleston's rapid growth and the advent of Panamax ships, the port underwent a series of projects to increase its capacity, including the construction of a new terminal named after Hugh Leatherman at a cost of $1 billion and an intermodal facility on the old navy yard. At full build-out, the terminal is expected to double the port's capacity. The University of South Carolina Darla Moore School of Business estimated that the SCPA's annual economic impact in the state was close to $63.4 billion in 2018.

In the next decade, the SCPA plans to replace the Don Holt Bridge in North Charleston to allow large ships to berth in a refurbished North Charleston Terminal. The North Charleston Terminal once handled a third of the port's containers but it currently handles around 200,000 containers a year, around 15 percent of the Port Authority's total volume. After refurbishment in the 2030s, the terminal is expected to handle up to 2 million containers a year. The Leatherman terminal was expected to meet capacity by 2040. However, it has largely been underutilized. In June 2026, the SCPA put an indefinite pause in operations at Leatherman which had been "bogged down by a drawn-out labor dispute and higher operating expenses". In 2024, the terminal accounted for less than 5 percent of the SCPA's cargo business.

=== Upstate automotive manufacturing cluster ===
The Upstate has been described as an industrial powerhouse due to its large presence of global companies. At one point the region had "the highest diversified foreign investment per capita in the United States." Additionally, it has had one of the highest concentrations of engineers in the country. The automotive manufacturing cluster in the region has made South Carolina the leading exporter of cars in the United States. In 1965, Hoechst was the first foreign company to move to South Carolina when it opened a plant in Spartanburg. Initially, the foreign investments were relatively small. But, that changed in 1970 when Michelin opened its first tire plant in the upstate.

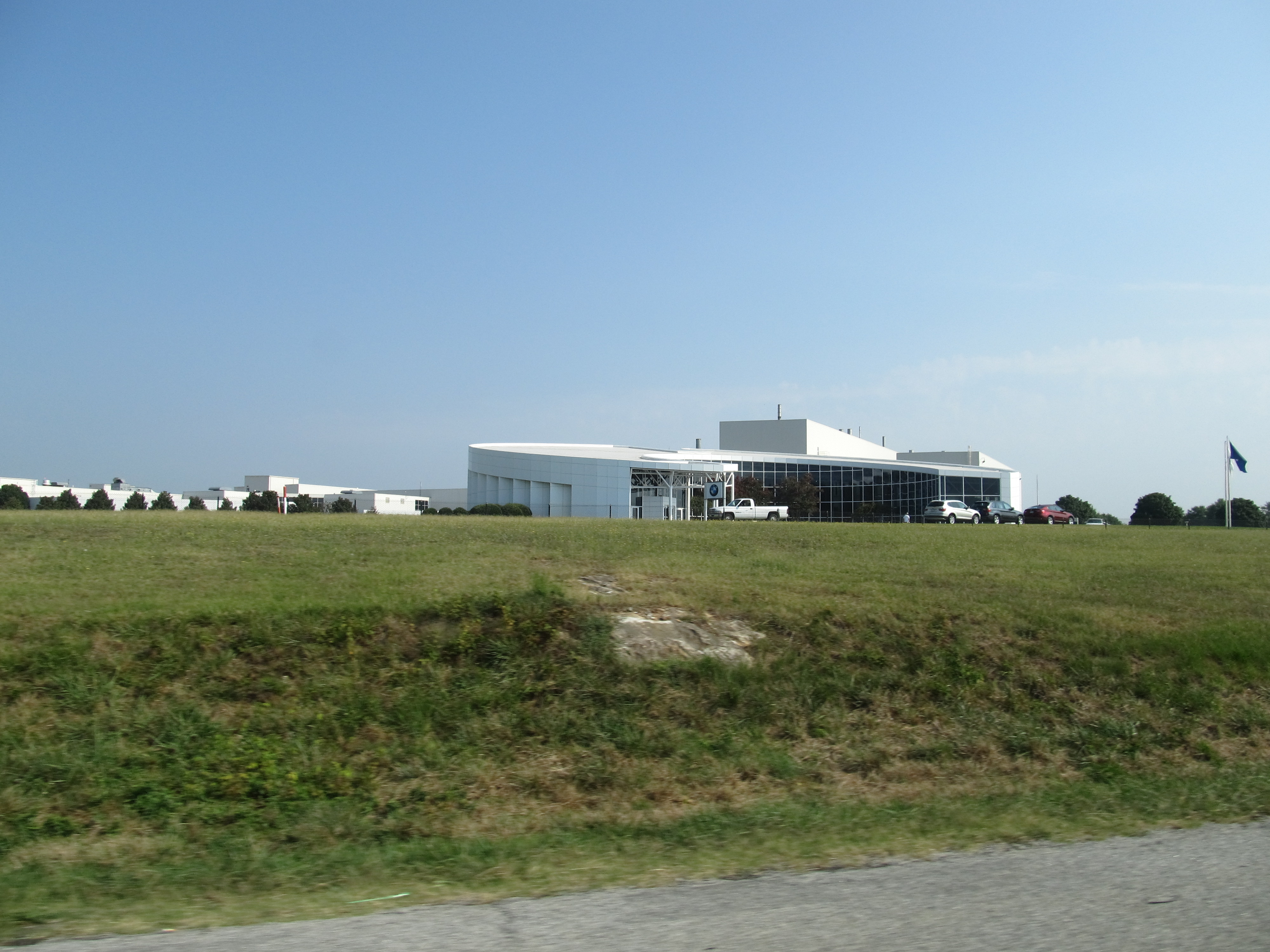
The visitor center of the BMW plant in Greer, South Carolina

Foreign investment increased overall in the country during the 1960s due to President Nixon's New Economic Policy but South Carolina had a few advantages already making it a particularly attractive location for businesses to locate. The state's nationally renowned technical schools program created by Governor Fritz Hollings in the 1960s provided a skilled labor force and transportation needs were well-covered due to the Port of Charleston. Additionally, South Carolina was one of the first states to systematically court European businessmen which raised awareness about the state's profile. From 1977 to 1987, the number of foreign-provided jobs in South Carolina rose from 35,000 to 75,700. The jobs replaced those from the textile industry which had started to decline in 1975 due to increased global competition and automation.

The swath of Interstate 85 in the upstate has been known as "the Autobahn" because of the large concentration of German companies that lie along the interstate. (Note: The interstate, completed in 1964, was the first in the state.) In the early 1990s, citing the Upstate's access to Charlotte and Atlanta due to the interstate, as well as the state's nationally renowned technical school program, BMW announced it would open its first manufacturing plant outside of Germany in an area of land between Greenville and Spartanburg. By enticing BMW to the area, South Carolina beat out 250 other locations spread out across ten separate countries. To do this, the state compiled an incentive package for the company including the necessary infrastructure and a $1-a-year lease for 1000 acres of land which the state purchased from private owners. Completed in 1995, the plant brought 2000 jobs to the area and scores more from the numerous BMW suppliers who followed BMW to the region. Historians Jack Bass and W. Scott Poole have stated that there is no element of modern economic development more important than the opening of the plant. By 2006, the plant produced its millionth car. The next year, the plant's workforce consisted of more than 5,400 employers with a weekly payroll of $30 million. Over the last 25 years, BMW has invested almost $11 billion into the plant, making it the largest BMW plant in the world. A study conducted in 2014 by the University of South Carolina calculated the plant's annual economic impact in the state to be $16.6 billion. In 2018, South Carolina exported $3.7 billion worth of products to Germany and German companies accounted for one-third of all foreign investments made in the state.

=== Aerospace manufacturing cluster ===
In October 2009, Boeing announced the opening of an 584,000-square-foot assembly plant in North Charleston which cost $2 billion to construct. Earlier that year, Boeing had purchased a Vought Aircraft facility in North Charleston due to Vought's inability to supply Boeing with parts on time. The company decided to expand operations in South Carolina instead of opening a second assembly line for the 787 Dreamliner in Washington state. A 2014 economic impact study conducted by the University of South Carolina Darla Moore School of Business found that since Boeing's arrival the aerospace manufacturing cluster within the state has generated almost the same amount of jobs per year as the BMW plant did in the upstate from 1990 to 2007. Additionally, the study estimated that the economic impact of the aerospace cluster resulting from private sector activity was $8 billion a year and $17 billion a year when also accounting for the state's military aviation facilities.

=== Lowcountry automotive manufacturing ===
2015 was momentous for the Lowcountry's economy. In March of that year, Daimler announced plans to construct a $500 million Mercedes Sprinter plant in North Charleston. Seven months later, Volvo Cars of North America also announced the construction of a $500 million automotive plant in Berkeley County. For Daimler, the plant was an expansion on a previously acquired facility which had been mothballed periodically. The director of economic analysis at the College of Charleston estimated that the Volvo plant would have an estimated annual economic impact of $4.8 billion. In 2018, the Volvo plant invested an additional $600 million into the plant to expand production and in early 2023, the plant will begin producing a new all-electric version of the XC90. To begin the production of that model, Volvo has announced the construction of a battery plant in the Fall of 2020 on its North Charleston campus. The company expects the production of the new XC90 to quadruple the plant's workforce.

=== Lowcountry tourism ===
South Carolina is a travel destination due to its beaches and historic cities. It was estimated that domestic travelers spent $14.4 billion on travel expenditures in South Carolina during 2018. Horry County, which includes Myrtle Beach, accounted for $4.5 billion, Charleston County accounted for $2.6 billion, and Beaufort County, which includes the resort town of Hilton Head, accounted for $1.4 billion.

Between 1924 and 1930, road mileage grew sixfold in the state which led to increased car traffic and access. Better roads led to more development in the northern parts of the coastline while a litany of travel periodicals idealized the South making the area more appealing to outsiders. After World War II, the growth of tourism exploded in the United States. South Carolina began investing small amounts into advertising and public relations in the late 1940s. However, the state's tourism industry remained underdeveloped for almost two decades; only North Dakota and Rhode Island produced less income from tourism than South Carolina did in the 1950s. It wasn't until the formation of the South Carolina Department of Parks, Recreation, and Tourism in 1967 under Governor Robert McNair that the state began investing adequately in the development of its tourism industry.

By 1977, the state's role in tourism promotion was seen as a national model by a Senate Subcommittee formed to develop a national tourism policy. The following year, tourists spent $1.7 billion in South Carolina and the state ranked twentieth within the United States in number of tourists. In the 1980s, South Carolina competed with Florida for tourists and started advertising itself as an international destination. Hurricane Hugo struck the state in 1989 and severely damaged the coast of South Carolina. But, paradoxically, the damage led to growth in the region because the destruction of small beach structures opened up space for larger condominiums. The Gullah/Geechee Heritage Corridor was established in 2006 to help preserve the cultures unique to the lowcountry of South Carolina, Georgia, and Florida that was being erased due to the expansion of tourism development. The bill establishing the corridor was introduced by South Carolina congressman Jim Clyburn and signed by President George W. Bush.

==== Tourism in Charleston ====
Charleston became an international tourist destination largely due to the city's historic center, culinary scene, and the leadership of Joe Riley, the city's mayor for almost forty years. First elected in 1975, Riley rejuvenated the city's downtown and ensured Charleston became the destination for Spoleto Festival USA, a large performance arts festival. In the last three decades, the number of tourists and residents in Charleston grew significantly. From 1985 to 2018, the number of tourists almost quadrupled from 2 million to 7.3 million. Tourism accounted for an economic impact of $8 billion in 2018. The population of the tri-county area, consisting of Charleston, Berkeley, and Dorchester counties, has grown from almost 507,000 residents in 1990 to 787,643 residents in 2018; far surpassing estimates made in the early 2000s.

Growth in Charleston and the surrounding counties has not been without its issues. The increase in population has also coincided with increased vehicular traffic. The Lowcountry Corridor Plan, a planned $2 billion expansion of the region's highways, is meant to address the area's congestion. The city also grapples with gentrification. As the city began developing, African American families began moving out of the downtown area. For instance, from 1950 to 1920, the number of residents in Charleston's East Side neighborhood who were black decreased 74% from 1950 to 2010 while the percent of white residents who moved to the neighborhood rose 83% during that period.

Charleston's tourism industry took a while to come to fruition. Following the boom in tourism during the 1880s, Charleston was largely bypassed by visitors on their way to Florida. The travelers who did visit Charleston were attracted by the city's ruins and overgrown gardens such as Magnolia Plantation and Gardens. In the interwar period, Charleston's large inventory of old homes started to be seen as an asset to be preserved. The best-selling novel Porgy written in 1925 by DuBose Heyward was instrumental in making Charleston a tourist attraction. White visitors, roughly 47,000 visitors came to the city from 1929 to 1930, saw the city's African American population as a sight to be seen. One of the city's largest attractions during the interwar period was put on by the Society for the Preservation of Spirituals, an organization of wealthy white Charlestonians who sang (and appropriated) slave spirituals. For most of the twentieth century, Charleston tourism boosters offered a false and gentile perception of what Charleston had been like during the antebellum period.

Charleston's tourism industry continues to see major investment in luxury accommodations and commercial real estate along its historic downtown waterfront.

=== Statistics and inequality ===
In 2019, despite South Carolina's relatively high GDP growth rate of 3.0%, 15.4% of the state's citizens lived below the poverty line which was among the nation's highest. That year, South Carolina's GDP was $249.9 billion, making the state the 26th largest by GDP in the United States and half that of neighboring Georgia and North Carolina. Additionally, while South Carolina's unemployment rate was 2.4%, around middle of the pack compared to other states, the state's GDP per capita was $41,457 which was among the lowest in the country.

The 2020 Census showed that since 2010, South Carolina's population has grown by nearly 500,000 people. The counties which saw the highest growth rates from 2010 to 2020 were Horry County (30.4% increase), Berkeley County (29.2% increase), York County, and Lancaster County. In contrast, the rural counties of Allendale, Bamberg, and Lee each lost over 14% of their population during that time.

While the Great Recession in 2008 resulted in plummeting home values nationwide, houses in predominantly African American neighborhoods were the least likely to recover. In fact, land ownership in the state by African Americans declined throughout the twentieth century. In the case of the Gullah/Geechee community, this loss was often due to forced partition sales. Nationwide income inequality between African Americans and Caucasians has not changed in 70 years. In the city of Charleston, black citizens earn 60% of what white citizens make. Furthermore, in Charleston, high income home purchase loan applicants who were black had a rejection rate of 31% between the years 2005 and 2014 while high income white applicants had a rejection rate of 10% during that period.

South Carolina's supply of affordable housing places near the bottom nationwide—in 2016, it had by far the worst eviction rate in the country, almost twice as high as the next contender.

=== 2019–2025 ===
South Carolina fared better economically than many states during the COVID-19 pandemic, especially in the upstate region. By the end of 2020, the state's unemployment rate was 4.2%. However, economists expect South Carolina won't return to its pre-pandemic employment levels until February 2022. South Carolina's real GDP fell 4.1% from 2019 to 2020.

Nonetheless, investments were still made in the state. Mark Anthony Brewing announced the construction of a White Claw Hard Seltzer brewing and production facility in Richland County at a cost of $400 million. It is estimated that the facility will create 300 jobs in the county. Further, E & J Gallo Winery announced plans to build a bottling facility in Fort Lawn, South Carolina. The facility is also estimated to cost $400 million and it is estimated that it will create 500 jobs. Moreover, the federal government provided $25 million in funding to aid the construction of a proposed rail line which will transport vehicles from Volvo's plant to inland distribution points. The line will run near the new state-owned Camp Hall Commerce Park, a nearly 4,000-acre business park.

In 2021, the PGA Tour had what one commentator called "the South Carolina swing." The state hosted the annual RBC Heritage on Hilton Head Island in April, a PGA Championship at Kiawah Island in May, and after the Canadian Open was canceled, the PGA announced South Carolina would host another tournament titled the Palmetto Championship at Congaree in June. This latter tournament is expected to bring in approximately $50 million in tourism revenue.

In 2022 and 2023, a number of large economic development projects were announced. In 2022, more than ten billion dollars in capital investments in South Carolina were announced, including a $3.5 billion automotive battery recycling and production facility located in Berkeley County, a new $1.7 billion BMW facility in the upstate, and a large scale automotive battery facility in Florence County costing close to $1 billion. Moreover, in March 2023, Scout Motors announced it was opening a $2 billion electric vehicle manufacturing facility near Columbia, South Carolina, marking the first large automotive manufacturing facility located in South Carolina's midlands region. The announcement of the plant coincided with Governor Henry McMaster announcing that he would request $1.3 billion in incentives, including investments in infrastructure, from the S.C. legislature to secure Scout Motors' investment.

In 2023, South Carolina's GDP was ranked 24th out of all states in the United States. The GDP of South Carolina grew 6.9% in 2024—which was the second highest growth rate in the nation—from a nominal GDP of $327.42 billion in 2023 to $349,96 billion in 2024. The unemployment rate in South Carolina in March 2025 was 4.1%.

== See also ==
- Nukegate scandal

== Bibliography ==
- A History of the Phosphate Mining Industry in the South Carolina Lowcountry. Brockington and Associates, Inc., 2004.
- Bass, Jack, and W. Scott Poole. The Palmetto State: The Making of Modern South Carolina. University of South Carolina Press, 2012.
- Berlin, Ira. Many Thousands Gone: The First Two Centuries of Slavery in North America. Belknap Press of Harvard University Press. 2000. p. 142
- Blinder, Alan; Fausset, Richard (31 May 2017). "Trump Targets German Trade, and the South Grimaces". The New York Times.
- Bonnin, Patrica Dora. "The Problem of Relief For the Families of Confederate Soldiers in South Carolina." South Carolina in the Civil War and Reconstruction Eras: Essays From the Proceedings of the South Carolina Historical Association, 1994.
- Brown, David (1 February 2014). "'To work industriously and steadily': Frederick Law Olmsted and the Southern Work Ethic Revisited". American Studies in Scandinavia. 46 (1): 11–30. doi:10.22439/asca.v46i1.5148.
- Charleston County Historical and Architectural Survey. Preservation Associates, Inc., 1992.
- Charleston County Historic Resources Survey Update. New South Associates, 2016.
- Cline, Cassie Linda, "Development Without Displacement: Analyzing Factors of Historic Neighborhoods Threatened by Gentrification." All Theses, 2017, wwww.tigerprints.clemson.edu/all_theses/2612
- Coclanis, Peter. The Shadow of a Dream: Economic Life and Death in the South Carolina Low Country, 1670–1920. New York: Oxford University Press, 1989.
- Coclanis, Peter A. (2014). "White Heat: Eugene D. Genovese and the Challenge of and to Southern History, 1965–1969". The Georgia Historical Quarterly. 98 (4): 350–359. JSTOR 44735560.
- Conger, John L. (1919). "South Carolina and the Early Tariffs". The Mississippi Valley Historical Review. 5 (4): 415–433. doi:10.2307/1889531. JSTOR 1889531.
- Census of Agriculture. United States Department of Agriculture, 1860. Retrieved from [https://web.archive.org/web/20151122014951/http://agcensus.mannlib.cornell.edu/AgCensus/censusParts.do?year=1860 cornell.edu].
- Census of Agriculture. United States Department of Agriculture, 1870. Retrieved from .
- Dennett, John R. The South As It Is: 1865–1866. University Alabama Press, 2010.
- Downey, Tom. Planting a Capitalist South: Masters, Merchants, and Manufacturers in the Southern Interior, 1790–1860. Louisiana State University Press, 2006.
- Historic Architectural Resources Survey of the Upper Peninsula, Charleston, South Carolina. Brockington and Associates, Inc., 2004.
- Fogel, Robert William. Without Consent or Contract: The Rise and Fall of American Slavery. New York: Norton, 1989.
- Ford Jr., Lacy K. Origins of Southern Radicalism: The South Carolina Upcountry 1800–1860. New York: Oxford University Press, 1988.
- Foust, Dean, and Maria Mallory. "The Boom Belt." Business Insider, 1993, www.bloomberg.com/news/articles/1993-09-26/the-boom-belt.
- Frederickson, Kari A. Cold War Dixie. The University of Georgia Press, 2013.
- Freehling, William W. Prelude to Civil War: the Nullification Controversy in South Carolina, 1816–1836. Oxford University Press, 1992.
- Genovese, Eugene D. The Political Economy of Slavery Studies in the Economy and Society of the Slave South. Wesleyan University Press, 1989.
- Getman, Julius G. "Boeing, the IAM, and the NLRB: Why U.S. Labor Law Is Failing." Minnesota Law Review, 2014, pp. 1651–1681.
- Johnson, Walter. River of Dark Dreams: Slavery and Empire in the Cotton Kingdom. Belknap Press of Harvard University Press, 2013.
- Kanter, Rosabeth Moss. "Thriving Locally in the Global Economy." Harvard Business Review, 2003, https://hbr.org/2003/08/thriving-locally-in-the-global-economy. Accessed 7 July 2020
- King, P. Nicole (2012). Sombreros and Motorcycles in a Newer South: The Politics of Aesthetics in South Carolina's Tourism Industry. Univ. Press of Mississippi. ISBN 978-1-61703-252-3.
- Kohn, August, The Cotton Mills of South Carolina. Charleston: News & Courier, 1907. LOC, <lccn.loc.gov/08002383>.
- Kovacik, Charles F.; Mason, Robert E. (1985). "Changes in the South Carolina Sea Island Cotton Industry". Southeastern Geographer. 25 (2): 77–104. doi:10.1353/sgo.1985.0007. JSTOR 44370777. S2CID 128954745. Project MUSE 429520.
- Kytle, Ethan J., and Blain Roberts. Denmark Vesey's Garden. The New Press, 2018.
- Lander, Ernest M. (1960). "Charleston: Manufacturing Center of the Old South". The Journal of Southern History. 26 (3): 330–351. doi:10.2307/2204523. JSTOR 2204523.
- Maunula, Marko. Guten Tag, Y’all: Globalization and the South Carolina Piedmont, 1950–2000. University of Georgia Press, 2010.
- Martin, Thomas P. (1945). "The Advent of William Gregg and the Graniteville Company". The Journal of Southern History. 11 (3): 389–423. doi:10.2307/2197814. JSTOR 2197814.
- McCusker, John J.; Menard, Russell R. (2014). The Economy of British America, 1607-1789. UNC Press Books. ISBN 978-1-4696-0000-0.
- McKinley, Shepherd W. (2014). Stinking Stones and Rocks of Gold: Phosphate, Fertilizer, and Industrialization in Postbellum South Carolina. University Press of Florida. ISBN 978-0-8130-4924-3.
- Mekow, Christopher A. "The Bombardment of Charleston, 1863–1865." South Carolina in the Civil War and Reconstruction Eras: Essays From the Proceedings of the South Carolina Historical Association, 2004. pp. 67–78.
- Nash, Betty Joyce (Summer 2011). "When South Carolina Met BMW". Region Focus. 15 (2): 20–22.
- Palmer, Aaron (2014). A Rule of Law: Elite Political Authority and the Coming of the Revolution in the South Carolina Lowcountry, 1763-1776. BRILL. ISBN 978-90-04-27235-4.
- Pease, Jane H.; Pease, William H. (February 1982). "Social Structure and the Potential for Urban Change: Boston and Charleston in the 1830s". Journal of Urban History. 8 (2): 171–195. doi:10.1177/009614428200800203. S2CID 144252612. ProQuest 1297903337.
- Prince, Eldred E., and Simpson, Robert R.. Long Green: The Rise and Fall of Tobacco in South Carolina. Greece, University of Georgia Press, 2013.
- Sass, Herbert Ravenel, 1884–1958. The Story of the South Carolina Lowcountry. West Columbia, S.C.: J.F. Hyer, 1956.
- Simon, Bryant (1998). A Fabric of Defeat: The Politics of South Carolina Millhands, 1910-1948. Univ of North Carolina Press. ISBN 978-0-8078-4704-6.
- The U.S. Textile and Apparel Industry: A Revolution in Progress. U.S. Congress, Office of Technology, 1987.
- The Economic Impact of the South Carolina Ports Authority: A Statewide and Regional Analysis. Darla Moore School of Business, 2019. www.scspa.com/about/our-impact/economic-impact/
- The Economic Impact of Travel on South Carolina Counties 2018. U.S. Travel Association, 2019.
- The State of Racial Inequality in Charleston County, South Carolina, 2000-2015. Avery Research Center for African American History and Culture, College of Charleston, 2017. Retrieved from rsji.cofc.edu/wp-content/uploads/2017/01/The-State-of-Racial-Disparities-in-Charleston-County-SC-Rev.-11-14.pdf
- Williams, George Walton, 1820–1903, and George Sherwood Dickerman. History of Banking In South Carolina From 1712 to 1900. Charleston, S. C.: Walker, Evans & Cogswell, 1903.
- Wilson, Arthur. "The Logwood Trade in the Seventeenth and Eighteenth Cen-turies," in Essays in the History of Modern Europe, ed. Donald C. McKay (New York, 1936), p. 1-15.
- Wise, Stephen R. and Lawrence S. Rowland. Rebellion, Reconstruction, and Redemption, 1861–1893: The History of Beaufort County, South Carolina, Volume 2. Columbia: University of South Carolina Press, 2015.
- Wright, Gavin. Slavery and American Economic Development. Louisiana State University Press, 2006.
