= Eugene Genovese =

American historian (1930–2012)

- Born: Eugene Dominic Genovese; May 19, 1930; Brooklyn, New York, U.S.
- Died: September 26, 2012 (aged 82); Atlanta, Georgia, U.S.
- Education: Brooklyn College (BA); Columbia University (MA, PhD)
- Spouse: Elizabeth Fox-Genovese (m. 1969; died 2007)
- Awards: Bancroft Prize (1975)
- Scientific career
- Workplaces: University of Rochester; Rutgers University; Sir George Williams University

Eugene Dominic Genovese (May 19, 1930 – September 26, 2012) was an American historian of the American South and American slavery. He was noted for bringing a Marxist perspective to the study of power, class and relations between planters and slaves in the South. His book Roll, Jordan, Roll: The World the Slaves Made won the Bancroft Prize. He wrote during the Cold War; his political beliefs were viewed by some as highly controversial at the time. He later abandoned the left and Marxism and embraced traditionalist conservatism.

== Early life and education ==
Genovese was born on May 19, 1930, in Brooklyn, New York. His father was an immigrant dockworker and Eugene was raised in a working-class Italian American family.

In 1945, at the age of 15, he joined the Communist Party USA, and was active in the youth movement until he was expelled in 1950, at the age of 20, for disregarding party discipline or, as he said, "for having zigged when [he] was supposed to zag," a decision approved by then communist organiser and later fellow historian of slavery Robert Fogel. He earned his Bachelor of Arts from Brooklyn College in 1953 and his Master of Arts in 1955 and a Ph.D. in history in 1959, both from Columbia University. He taught at another dozen universities, including Yale, Cambridge and Rutgers.

He was later discharged from army service for his communist leanings.

== Career ==
Genovese first taught at Brooklyn's Polytechnic Institute from 1958 to 1963. During the early years of the Vietnam War, when there was a growing range of opinions about the war and the Civil Rights Movement, he was a controversial figure as a history professor at Rutgers University (1963–67), and at the University of Rochester (1969–86), where he was elected chairman of the Department of History.

He was an editor of Studies on the Left and Marxist Perspectives and was on the editorial board of Science & Society. He was famous for his disputes with colleagues left, right and center. Defeating Oscar Handlin in 1978, he was elected as the first Marxist president of the Organization of American Historians. From 1986, Genovese taught part-time at the College of William and Mary, Georgia Institute of Technology, University of Georgia, Emory University and Georgia State University.

In 1998, after moving to the political right in his thinking, Genovese founded The Historical Society, with the goal of bringing together historians united by a traditional methodology.

== Controversy during the Vietnam war ==
At an April 23, 1965, teach-in at Rutgers University where he was teaching, Genovese stated, "Those of you who know me know that I am a Marxist and a Socialist. Therefore, unlike most of my distinguished colleagues here this morning, I do not fear or regret the impending Viet Cong victory in Vietnam. I welcome it." This comment was widely reported and generated a backlash of criticism. Politicians questioned Genovese's judgment and sensitivity to the responsibility inherent in being a Rutgers professor. Richard M. Nixon, then out of office and living in New York, denounced him, and the Republican candidate for governor of New Jersey, Wayne Dumont, challenging Governor Richard J. Hughes, used Genovese's statement as a campaign issue, demanding that Hughes dismiss Genovese from the state university. Bumper stickers saying "Rid Rutgers of Reds" popped up on cars across the state. Genovese insisted that he did not mean to say that he hoped American servicemen would be killed. No state laws or university regulations had been broken, and Genovese was supported by fellow faculty members on grounds of academic freedom. He was not dismissed from his teaching position.

Rutgers President Mason Gross refused to re-examine the university's position, and Dumont lost to Governor Hughes. President Gross's defense of academic freedom was honored by the American Association of University Professors, who presented him and Rutgers with its Alexander Meiklejohn Award in 1966. Genovese moved to Canada and taught at Sir George Williams University in Montreal (1967–69). In 1968, Genovese signed the "Writers and Editors War Tax Protest" pledge, vowing to refuse tax payments in protest against the Vietnam War.

At the 1969 convention of the American Historical Association, radical historians Staughton Lynd and Arthur Waskow, speaking on behalf of the Radical Caucus, introduced and later withdrew a resolution demanding an end to not only to the war in Vietnam but also to an “immediate end of all harassment of the Black Panther Party”. A substitute resolution introduced by the radical scholar Blanche W. Cook "deplored and condemned" the war and urged withdrawal of all American troops. It was Cook's resolution that eventually came to a vote.

During the discussion on the resolution, Genovese gave a speech, saying that although he opposed the Vietnam war, if the radicals' resolution passed, the bulk of historians in the AHA, who favored the war, would be forced to resign from the group. Noting that the majority of Americans also supported the war, Genovese said that those citizens were as moral and deserving of being heard as the war's opponents. The Radical Caucus, he said, were a bunch of "totalitarians." Genovese ended his speech by saying that the time had come for historians to isolate and defeat the New Left and "put them down, put them down hard, once and for all." When the vote was finally taken, the resolution lost, 647 to 611.

== Slavery studies ==
Genovese argued that the Southern slaveholders were not rational economic actors and that slavery made the south unable to develop in the same way the Northern states would. This was seen as a restatement, albeit from the left, of Ulrich B. Phillips' thesis that American slavery was a reciprocal if uneven relationship between the slaves and the slaveholders. Genovese's intellectual closeness to Phillips was shown by him quoting Phillips on the front of his first book.

=== The Political Economy of Slavery ===
The Political Economy of Slavery was a collection of essays that examined the economic Southern slave economy through a Marxist lens, arguing it was pre-capitalist with a paternalistic ideology that conflicted with the capitalist norms of the industrial North, agreeing with the more conservative analysis of Ulrich B. Phillips. Genovese contends that the economic logic of slavery was rational within its own context, but ultimately unsustainable due to its resistance to technological progress and internal contradictions. By redefining scholarly debate on the relationship between capitalism and Southern slavery it remains one of Genovese's most influential works.

=== Materialism and Idealism in the History of Negro Slavery in the Americas ===
In 1968, Genovese wrote a critical historiography of the major studies of slavery in the Americas from a hemispheric perspective. He considered the demand by Marxist anthropologist Marvin Harris in Patterns of Race in the Americas for a materialist alternative to the idealistic framework of historians such as Frank Tannenbaum, Stanley Elkins, and Gilberto Freyre. Tannenbaum had first introduced the hemispheric perspective by showing that the current status of blacks in various societies of the Western Hemisphere had roots in the attitude toward the black as a slave, which reflected the total religious, legal, and moral history of the enslaving whites. Tannenbaum, he argued, ignored the material foundations of slave society, most particularly class relations. Later students have qualified his perspectives but have worked within the framework of an "idealistic" interpretation. Harris, on the other hand, insisted that material conditions determined social relations and necessarily prevailed over counter-tendencies in the historical tradition. Harris's work revealed him to be an economic determinist and, as such, Genovese maintained, ahistorical. By attempting to construct a materialism that bypassed ideological and psychological elements in the formation of social classes, he passed into a "variant of vulgar Marxism" and offered only soulless mechanism.

=== The World the Slaveholders Made ===
In the 1960s, Genovese in his Marxist stage depicted the masters of the slaves as part of a "seigneurial" society that was anti-modern, pre-bourgeois and pre-capitalist in The World the Slaveholders Made. In 1970 Stampp's review found fault with the quantity and quality of the evidence used to support the book's arguments. He took issue with the attempt to apply a Marxian interpretation to the Southern slave system.

=== Roll, Jordan, Roll ===
In his best-known book, Roll, Jordan, Roll: The World the Slaves Made (1974), Genovese examined the society of the slaves. This book won the Bancroft Prize in 1975. Genovese viewed the antebellum South as a closed and organically united paternalist society that exploited and attempted to dehumanize the slaves. Genovese paid close attention to the role of religion as a form of resistance in the daily life of the slaves, because slaves used it to claim a sense of humanity. He redefined resistance to slavery as all efforts by which slaves rejected their status as slaves, including their religion, music, and the culture they built, as well as work slowdowns, periodic disappearances, and escapes and open rebellions. Genovese applied Antonio Gramsci's theory of cultural hegemony to the slave South, as well as to Caribbean case studies.

=== From Rebellion to Revolution ===
In his 1979 book, From Rebellion to Revolution, Genovese depicted a change in slave rebellions from attempts to win freedom to an effort to overthrow slavery as a social system.

=== Fruits of Merchant Capital ===
In the 1983 book that he co-wrote with his wife, The Fruits of Merchant Capital, Genovese underscored what he regarded as tensions between bourgeois property and slavery. In the view of the Genoveses, slavery was a "hybrid system" that was both pre-capitalist and capitalist.

=== The Slaveholders’ Dilemma ===
In The Slaveholders’ Dilemma, Genovese explores how antebellum slaveholders sought to reconcile their contradictory commitments to slavery with Enlightenment ideals of liberty and progress. He argued that they could neither fully abandon nor fully integrate the dominant liberalism of the nineteenth century. It was seen as a turn to a greater concentration on intellectual history.

=== The Mind of the Master Class ===
The Mind of the Master Class, analyzes how antebellum Southern slaveholders, through a richly documented survey of their reading, religious beliefs, and political philosophy, constructed a deeply conservative, paternalistic intellectual worldview rooted in classical and Christian traditions to justify slavery while engaging with broader transatlantic and modern debates.

== Shift to the right ==
Starting in the 1990s, Genovese turned his attention to the history of conservatism in the South, a tradition which he came to adopt and celebrate. He examined the Southern Agrarians in his study The Southern Tradition. In the 1930s, these critics and poets collectively wrote I'll Take My Stand, their critique of Enlightenment humanism. He concluded that by recognizing human sinfulness and limitation, the critics more accurately described human nature than did other thinkers. He argued that the Southern Agrarians also posed a challenge to modern American conservatives who believe in market capitalism's compatibility with traditional social values and family structures. Genovese agreed with the Agrarians in concluding that capitalism destroyed those institutions.

In his personal views, Genovese moved to the right. While he once denounced liberalism from a radical left perspective, he now did so as a traditionalist conservative. His change in thinking included abandoning atheism and re-embracing Catholicism, the faith in which he had been raised, in December 1996. His wife, historian Elizabeth Fox-Genovese, had also shifted her thinking and converted to Catholicism.

== Personal life and death ==
In 1969, Genovese married historian Elizabeth Fox. She died in 2007 and he published a tribute to her the next year. Genovese died in 2012, aged 82, from a "worsening cardiac ailment" in Atlanta, Georgia.

== Works ==
- Genovese, Eugene D. (1965), The Political Economy of Slavery: Studies in the Economy and the Society of the Slave South, Middletown, Connecticut: Weslayan University Press. Second Edition.
- Genovese, E. D. (1968). "Materialism and Idealism in the History of Negro Slavery in the Americas". Journal of Social History. 1 (4): 371–94. doi:10.1353/jsh/1.4.371. ISSN 0022-4529.
- Genovese, Eugene D. (1969), The World the Slaveholders Made: Two Essays in Interpretation
- Genovese, Eugene D. (1971), In Red and Black: Marxian Explorations in Southern and Afro-American History
- Roll, Jordan, Roll: The World the Slaves Made, 1974 Winner of the Bancroft Prize in History.
- Genovese, Eugene (January 1975). "Class, culture, and historical process". Dialectical Anthropology. 1 (1–4): 71–79. doi:10.1007/BF00244570. ISSN 0304-4092.
- Fox-Genovese, E.; Genovese, E.D. (1976), "The Political Crisis of Social History: A Marxian Perspective", Journal of Social History, 10 (2): 205–220, doi:10.1353/jsh/10.2.205 (with Elizabeth Fox-Genovese)
- Genovese, Eugene D. (1979). From Rebellion to Revolution: Afro-American Slave Revolts in the Making of the Modern World.
- Genovese, Eugene; Fox-Genovese, Elizabeth (1983). Fruits of Merchant Capital: Slavery and Bourgeois Property in the Rise and Expansion of Capitalism. New York: Oxford University Press. ISBN 0-19-503157-1.
- Genovese, Eugene D. (1992), The Slaveholders' Dilemma: Freedom and Progress in Southern Conservative Thought, 1820–1860
- Genovese, Eugene (1994), The Southern Tradition: The Achievement and Limitations of an American Conservatism
- The Southern Front: History and Politics in the Cultural War, 1995
- A Consuming Fire: The Fall of the Confederacy in the Mind of the White Christian South, Mercer University Lamar Memorial Lectures, 1998
- Genovese, Eugene; Fox-Genovese, Elizabeth (2005). The Mind of the Master Class: History and Faith in the Southern Slaveholders' Worldview.
- Genovese, Eugene D. (2008), Miss Betsey: A Memoir of Marriage, ISI Books, p. 143, ISBN 9781935191018
- Slavery in White and Black: Class and Race in the Southern Slaveholders' New World Order, 2008.
- Fatal Self-Deception: Slaveholding Paternalism in the Old South, New York: Cambridge University Press, 2011 (with Elizabeth Fox-Genovese)
- The Sweetness of Life: Southern Planters at Home, New York: Cambridge University Press, 2017 (edited by Douglas Ambrose)

== Bibliography ==
- Baca, George. (2012). "Eugene Genovese and a Dialectical Anthropology." Dialectical Anthropology, 36:245-262. online
- Boles, John; Nolen, Elelyn Thomas, eds. (1987), Interpreting Southern History: Historiographical Essays in Honour of Sanford W. Higginbotham, Louisiana State University Press.
- Busick, Sean (July 3, 2012). "A Specialist in the American South: Eugene Genovese". The Imaginative Conservative.
- Davis, David Brion (1974). "Slavery and the post-World War II historians". Daedalus. 103 (2): 1–16. JSTOR 20024201.
- Davis, David Brion (October 5, 1995), "Southern Comfort", The New York Review of Books: 43–46.
- ——— (2001), In the Image of God: Religion, Moral Values, and Our Heritage of Slavery, pp. 110–20
- Dew, Charles B. (Spring 1967). "Reviewed Works: The Political Economy of Slavery: Studies in the Economy and Society of the Slave South by Eugene D. Genovese; American Negro Slavery by Ulrich Bonnell Phillips". Louisiana History: The Journal of the Louisiana Historical Association. 8 (2). Louisiana Historical Association: 215–219. JSTOR 4230956.
- Dworkin, Dennis (2007). Class Struggles. Edinburgh: Pearson Education. ISBN 9781405801386.
- Elkins, Stanley M. (1959). Slavery: A Problem in American Institutional and Intellectual Life. ISBN 978-0-226-20477-2.
- Harris, Marvin (1964). Patterns of race in the Americas. Walker.
- Harris, J. William (May 2014). "Eugene Genovese's Old South: A Review Essay". The Journal of Southern History. 80 (2). Southern Historical Association: 327–372.
- Hahn, Steven (February 6, 2006). "Divine Rights". The New Republic.
- Hudson, Cheryl; Namusoke, Eva (2017). Eugene D. Genovese's Roll, Jordan, Roll: The World the Slaves Made. CRC Press. p. 100. ISBN 9781351351058.
- King, Richard H; Genovese, Eugene (1977), "Marxism and the Slave South: a Review Essay", American Quarterly, 29 (1): 117–31, doi:10.2307/2712264, ISSN 0003-0678, JSTOR 2712264; full text in Jstor.
- Kolchin, Peter (2004), "Eugene D. Genovese: Historian of Slavery", Radical History Review, 2004 (88): 52–67, doi:10.1215/01636545-2004-88-52, S2CID 143661301.
- Lichtenstein, Alex (Summer 1997). "Right Church, Wrong Pew: Eugene Genovese & Southern Conservatism". New Politics. 6 (3). Archived from the original on 2013-07-09. New Series.
- Linden, Adrianus Arnoldus Maria van der (1994), A Revolt Against Liberalism: American Radical Historians, 1959–1976, pp. 167–220.
- Livingston, James (2004), "Marxism' and the Politics of History: Reflections on the Work of Eugene D. Genovese", Radical History Review (88): 133–53 online.
- Meier, August; Elliott, Rudwirck (1986), Black History and the Historical Profession, 1915–1980, University of Illinois Press.
- Parish, Peter (1989), Slavery: History and Historians, New York: Harper
- Pessen, Edward (December 1980). "How Different from Each Other Were the Antebellum North and South?". The American Historical Review. 85 (5). Oxford University Press: 1119–1149. doi:10.2307/1853242. JSTOR 1853242.
- Radosh, Ronald (1978), "Eugene Genovese: the Rise of a Marxist Historian", Change (interview), 10 (10): 31–35, doi:10.1080/00091383.1978.10569535, ISSN 0009-1383, "Genovese, the first Marxist to be elected President of the Organization of American Historians, discusses Marxism's changing status on American campuses, and traces his career from his membership in the Communist youth movement to his becoming History Department Chairman at the University of Rochester".
- Reed, Jeffrey (October 1995). "Review of "The Political Economy of Slavery: Studies in the Economy and Society of the Slave South", by Eugene D. Genovese". H‑Net Reviews.
- Roper, John Herbert (1996), "Marxing through Georgia: Eugene Genovese and Radical Historiography for the Region", Georgia Historical Quarterly, 80: 77–92. online
- Shalhope, Robert E (July 1970), "Eugene Genovese, the Missouri Elite and Civil War Historiography", Bulletin of the Missouri Historical Society, 26: 271–82.
- Shapiro, Herbert (1982), "Eugene Genovese, Marxism, and the Study of Slavery", Journal of Ethnic Studies, 9 (4): 87–100, ISSN 0091-3219, "The work of Eugene Genovese is widely perceived within and beyond the historical profession as a product of creative Marxist scholarship, especially now that his Roll, Jordan, Roll has become for many reviewers "a definitive benchmark in the historiography of slavery." A close analysis of works such as The Political Economy of Slavery shows his greatest lacunae: the minimizing of the significance of black struggle and the magnifying of whatever elements of passivity can be found among blacks insofar as they actively participated in the Civil War. Accommodation and the plantation as community are overdone themes". online
- Sinha, Manisha (2004). "Eugene D. Genovese : The Mind of a Marxist Conservative". Radical History Review.
- Stampp, Kenneth M (1970), "Interpreting the Slaveholders' World: a Review", Agricultural History, 44 (4): 407–12, ISSN 0002-1482. online
- Steirer, William F (1974), "Eugene D. Genovese: Marxist-Romantic Historian of the South", Southern Review, 10: 840–50. online
- Tannenbaum, Frank (1947). Slave and Citizen: The Negro in the Americas. New York: Vintage Books.
- Wood, Peter H. (1975). "Review: Phillips Upside down: Dialectic or Equivocation?". Journal of Interdisciplinary History. 6 (2): 289–297. doi:10.2307/202235. JSTOR 202235.
- Wyatt-Brown, Bertram (Spring 1991). "Review of Ulrich Bonnell Phillips: A Southern Historian and His Critics by John David Smith, John C. Inscoe". Journal of the Early Republic. 11 (1). University of North Carolina Press: 140–142. doi:10.2307/3123345. JSTOR 3123345.
