= Roll, Jordan, Roll: The World the Slaves Made =

1974 historical study of American slavery by Eugene D. Genovese

- Title page for Roll, Jordan, Roll: The World the Slaves Made (1974)
- Author: Eugene D. Genovese
- Language: English
- Subject: American slavery, African-American history, Southern United States
- Genre: History, Non-fiction
- Publisher: Pantheon Books (original)
- Publication date: 1974
- Publication place: United States
- Media type: Print
- Pages: 823
- Awards: Bancroft Prize (1975)
- ISBN: 0-394-71652-3
- OCLC: 1021793
- Preceded by: The World the Slaveholders Made
- Followed by: From Rebellion to Revolution

Roll, Jordan, Roll: The World the Slaves Made by Eugene Genovese (1974) examines the society of the slaves. Genovese viewed the antebellum South as a closed and organically united paternalist society that exploited and attempted to dehumanize the slaves. He redefined resistance to slavery as all efforts by which slaves rejected their status as slaves, including their religion, music, and the culture they built, as well as work slowdowns, periodic disappearances, and open rebellions and escapes.

== Influences ==
=== Time on the Cross ===
In his acknowledgements Genovese says that Stanley Engerman, one of the authors of Time on the Cross which had been published two years before, read the entire manuscript and placed his and Robert Fogel's statistical and analytical work on the slave economy at his disposal.

=== Gramsci ===
Genovese applied Antonio Gramsci's theory of cultural hegemony to the slave South, as well as to Caribbean case studies as a way of explaining the planters' influence on slave culture. As Dennis Dworkin expresses it, "Like [E.P.] Thompson... Genovese deployed Gramsci's ideas. For Genovese, the slaveholding society of the Old South was rooted in exploitative class relationships, but most important was the cultural hegemony of slaveholders, their paternalistic ideology establishing both the potential and limits for a semiautonomous slave culture of resistance."

== Materials ==
Roll, Jordan, Roll was one of the earliest works to make extensive use of the Slave Narrative Collection gathered by the Federal Writers' Project in the 1930s. He also used 19th-century autobiographies of former slaves, plantation records, proslavery writings, and Southern religious tracts.

== Themes ==
=== Paternalism ===
Genovese placed paternalism at the center of the master-slave relationship, compared with other slave societies with a greater degree of absentee slaveholders. Both masters and slaves embraced paternalism but for different reasons and with varying notions of what paternalism meant. For the slaveowners, paternalism allowed them to think of themselves as benevolent and to justify their appropriation of their slaves' labor. Paternalist ideology, they believed, also gave the institution of slavery a more benign face and helped deflate the increasingly strong abolitionist critique of the institution.

Slaves, on the other hand, recognized that paternalist ideology could be twisted to suit their own ends by providing them with improved living and working conditions. This has been called the central thesis of the book. Slaves struggled mightily to convert the benevolent "gifts" or "privileges" bestowed upon them by their masters into customary rights that masters would not violate. The reciprocity of paternalism could work to the slaves' advantage by allowing them to demand more humane treatment from their masters.

=== Religion ===
Religion was an important theme in Roll, Jordan, Roll, paying close attention to the role of African religion in shaping Black Christianity.

He argued that enslaved African Americans adapted Christianity to their own needs, transformed it into a source of psychological and communal strength, and used it to assert their humanity within a paternalist system designed to deny it. Drawing on Gramsci’s theory of cultural hegemony, Genovese contended that while slaveholders sought ideological dominance, enslaved people engaged in a "counter-hegemonic" struggle by asserting values, traditions, and familial bonds that both contested and survived the constraints of bondage.

Genovese noted that Evangelicals recognized slavery as the root of Southern ills and sought some reforms, but from the early decades of the nineteenth century, they abandoned arguing for abolition or substantial change of the system. Genovese's contention was that after 1830, southern Christianity became part of social control of the slaves. He also argued that the slaves' religion was not conducive to millenarianism or a revolutionary political tradition. Rather, it helped them survive and resist.

=== Agency of the Slave ===
Roll, Jordan, Roll is widely credited with reshaping the historiography of American slavery by emphasizing the agency of enslaved people. Rather than portraying slaves solely as passive victims or cultural voids, Genovese depicted them as active participants in shaping their own communities, moral systems, and cultural identities. Genovese redefined resistance to slavery as all efforts by which slaves rejected their status as slaves, including their religion, music, and the culture they built, as well as work slowdowns, periodic disappearances, and open rebellions and escapes. This focus on slave resistance through culture, religion, and social relations helped define a new scholarly paradigm that took seriously the internal life and self-determination of the enslaved.

== Criticism ==
Areas of criticism included Genovese's placing of the master-slave relationship at the center of his interpretation of the American South, his views on southern white guilt over slavery, his employment of Gramsci's construct of hegemony, and his interpretations of southern white class interests, slave religion, the strength of the slave family, the existence of slave culture, and the theory of the generation of black nationalism in the antebellum years.

== Slavery Revisionism ==
Roll, Jordan, Roll was one of a number of revisionist studies published in the 1970s that departed from the traditional historiography of American slavery. Focusing on the perspective of the slave, new studies incorporated the slave narratives and WPA interviews: George Rawick's From Sunup to Sundown: The Making of the Black Community (1972), John Blassingame's The Slave Community, Peter H. Wood, Black Majority: Negroes in Colonial South Carolina from 1670 Through the Stono Rebellion (1974), Leslie Howard Owens's This Species of Property: Slave Life and Culture in the Old South (1976), Herbert G. Gutman's The Black Family in Slavery and Freedom, 1750–1925 (1976), Lawrence W. Levine's Black Culture and Black Consciousness: Afro-American Folk Thought from Slavery to Freedom (1977), and Albert J. Raboteau's Slave Religion: The "Invisible Institution" in the Antebellum South (1978).

== Awards ==
Awards include:

- Anisfield-Wolf Book Award
- Bancroft Prize (1975)
- National Book Award for Nonfiction

== Sources ==
- Davis, David Brion (1974). "Slavery and the post-World War II historians". Daedalus. 103 (2): 1–16. JSTOR 20024201.
- Dworkin, Dennis (2007). Class Struggles. Edinburgh: Pearson Education. pp. 57–58. ISBN 9781405801386.
- Genovese, Eugene (1974). Roll, Jordan, Roll: The World the Slaves Made. Vintage Books. ISBN 0-394-71652-3.
- Genovese, Eugene (January 1975). "Class, culture, and historical process". Dialectical Anthropology. 1 (1–4): 71–79. doi:10.1007/BF00244570. ISSN 0304-4092.
- King, Richard H. (1979). "On Eugene D. Genovese's Roll, Jordan, Roll: The World the Slaves Made, and Other Works". In Weinstein, Allen; Gatell, Frank (eds.). American Negro Slavery. Oxford: Oxford University Press. pp. 257–271.
- Kolchin, Peter (1993). American Slavery: 1619–1877.
- Wood, Peter H. (1975). "Review: Phillips Upside down: Dialectic or Equivocation?". Journal of Interdisciplinary History. 6 (2): 289–297. doi:10.2307/202235. JSTOR 202235.
