= Eléonore Raoul =

American suffragist (1888–1983)

Eléonore Raoul (1888–1983) was a suffragist, the first woman enrolled at Emory University, and one of the first female lawyers in the state of Georgia.

== Biography ==
Eléonore (sometimes spelled Eleanor and Eleanore) was born on 13 November 1888 in Staten Island, New York, to William Greene Raoul and Mary Millen Wadley. She made her debut in society in 1907. Elónore married Harry L. Greene on 29 June 1928, though she continued to use her maiden name professionally. The couple adopted three children: Harry Letcher, Victoria, and Eleonore Raoul. She died on 9 April 1983 in Gwinnett County, Georgia.

== Education ==
The Raouls moved to Atlanta in 1899, where Eléonore attended Washington Seminary and next St. Timothy's in Maryland. She took some correspondence courses at the University of Chicago before enrolling at Emory University School of Law in 1917, reportedly doing so while the chancellor was away from the school. The following year, the Emory Board of Trustees officially stated that women were barred from admission to the Law School, as well as the schools of medicine and theology. She, graduated with a law degree in 1920, the first woman to do so at that University. In 1979, Emory granted Eléonore an honorary Legum Doctor.

== Woman Suffrage Activism ==
In 1914, Eléonore organized the Fulton County and DeKalb County chapters of the Equal Suffrage Party. The Equal Suffrage Party was organized by Emily C. McDougald, Mary Millen Raoul (Eléonore's mother), and Mary Raoul (Eléonore's sister). It grew out of the Georgia Woman Suffrage Association in an effort towards more aggressive activism. It was as chair of the Suffrage Parade Committee for the Equal Suffrage Party of Georgia that Eléonore led a woman's suffrage parade in Atlanta on horseback on 17 November 1915. The parade consisted of between 500 and 1,000 marchers. Eléonore resigned from the Equal Suffrage Party in 1916 due to disagreements with the organization's president, Emily McDouglad.

After leaving the Georgia suffrage organizations, Eléonore worked with West Virginia and New Jersey suffrage organizations, as well as the National American Woman Suffrage Association New York office.

By 1919, Eléonore had returned to Atlanta, where she joined and was chair of the Central Committee of Women Citizens. As part of her role, she organized the distribution of letters to local female tax-payers who were eligible to vote in local Atlanta elections, encouraging them to register to vote. As a local election approached in the fall of 1919, Eléonore worked to educate more than 3,000 registered women voters on the voting process. Her instructions, written "for the benefit of the women voters," were published in The Atlanta Constitution and included directions for filling out the ballot and a list of candidates.

In 1920, the Central Committee grew into a new organization, the Atlanta League of Women Voters, with the continued goal of women's voter registration and education. It organized one month before the National organization, and Eléonore was elected its first president.

In 1950, Eléonore and fellow activist Maude Pollard Turman (aka Mrs R L Turman) formed Active Voters in Atlanta. Their goal was to increase the impact of their political activism by endorsing candidates, in addition to issues. Cited issues of focus were "honest elections, realignment of counties, home rule and tax revision" as well as opposition to expansion of the county unit system into general elections.

== Legacy ==
Elizabeth Fox-Genovese served as Eleonore Raoul Professor of the Humanities at Emory University.

The Raoul family papers are held at Emory University's Stuart A. Rose Manuscript, Archives, and Rare Book Library. Documents in the collection include records detailing Eléonore's work with the women's suffrage movement and the League of Women Voters.
