= Elizabeth Fox-Genovese =

American historian (1941–2007)

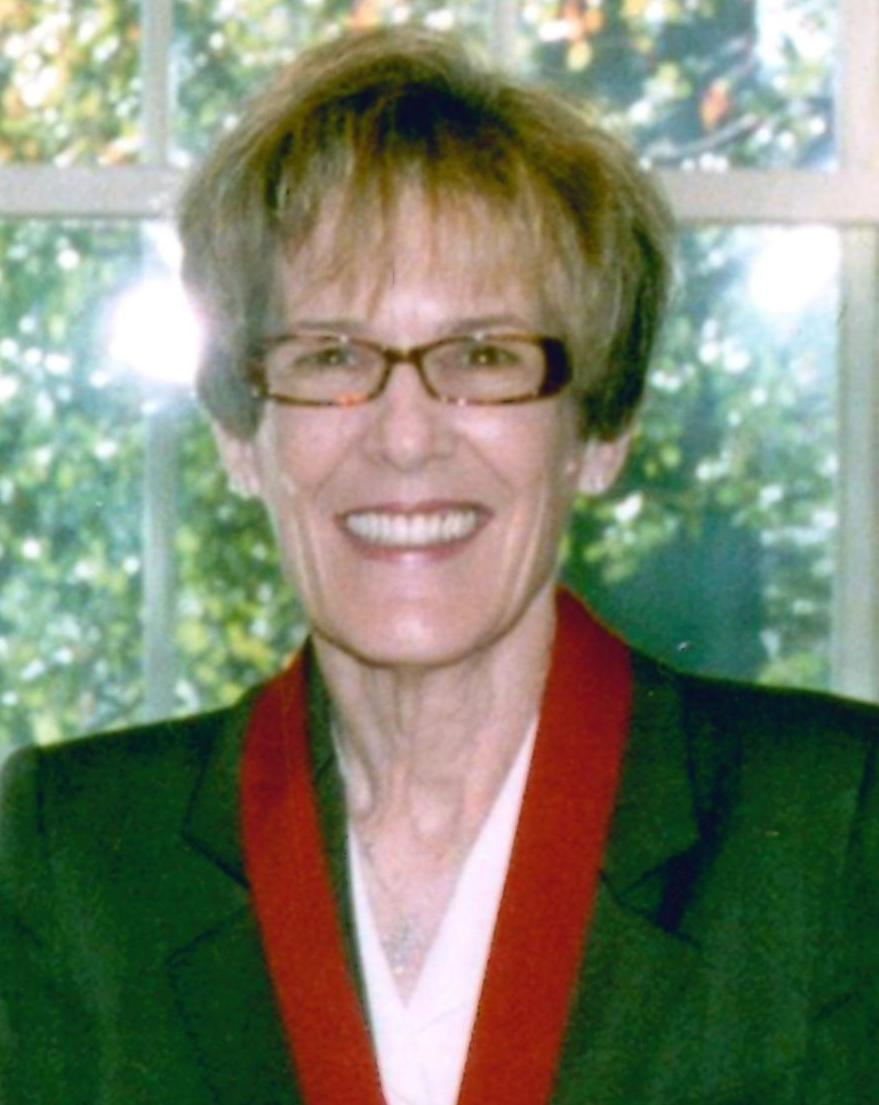
- Fox-Genovese in 2003
- Born: Elizabeth Ann Fox; May 28, 1941; Boston, Massachusetts, US
- Died: January 2, 2007 (aged 65); Atlanta, Georgia, US
- Education: Bryn Mawr College (BA); Harvard University (MA, PhD)
- Occupations: Historian, writer
- Spouse: Eugene Genovese (m. 1969)
- Relatives: Rebecca MacMillan Fox (sister); Robert E. Simon (uncle)

Elizabeth Ann Fox-Genovese (née Fox; May 28, 1941 – January 2, 2007) was an American historian best known for her works on women and society in the Antebellum South. A Marxist early on in her career, she later converted to Roman Catholicism and became a primary voice of the conservative women's movement. She was awarded the National Humanities Medal in 2003.

== Biography ==
Elizabeth Ann Fox was born in Boston, Massachusetts. She was the daughter of Cornell professor Edward Whiting Fox, a specialist in the history of modern Europe, and Elizabeth Mary (née Simon) Fox, whose brother was real estate mogul Robert E. Simon. Her father was Protestant, of English, Scottish, and Irish descent; her mother was Jewish, from a family that immigrated from Germany. Elizabeth Fox studied at the Institut d'Etudes Politiques de Paris in France and attended Bryn Mawr College. From Bryn Mawr College in 1963, she received a BA in French and history. At Harvard University, she earned a Master's degree in history in 1966 and a Ph.D. in 1974.

In 1969, she married fellow historian Eugene D. Genovese. They collaborated on some historical works in the course of their careers and had a professional partnership. In the 1970s, they founded the journal Marxist Perspectives, publishing the first issue in Spring 1978. Described as "brilliant but short-lived", it was published in the early 1980s. In 2012, in a partnership with the Brooklyn Institute for Social Research, Dissent magazine announced plans to digitize issues of the journal and make them available online.

After completing her Ph.D., Fox first taught at Binghamton University and the University of Rochester. In 1986, she was recruited as founding director for the Institute for Women's Studies at Emory University. At the Institute, she served as director and began the first doctoral program in Women's Studies in the US. She also taught history as the Eleonore Raoul Professor of the Humanities.

In 1993, L. Virginia Gould, one of her graduate students, named Fox-Genovese and Emory University as co-defendants in a sexual discrimination and harassment lawsuit. Emory settled the lawsuit out of court. Financial details were not released.

Fox-Genovese grew up in a household of secular intellectuals who, while respectful of Christianity, were nonbelieving. For most of her adult life, she considered herself Christian only "in the amorphous cultural sense of the word." Having "thoroughly imbibed materialist philosophy," she inhabited "a world that took it as a matter of faith that 'God is dead'." In 1995, however, Fox-Genovese publicly converted to Catholicism, due in part to her deep unease about "moral relativism", since she found "a world in which each followed his or her moral compass" neither rational nor viable. She said she was also reacting to the pride and self-centeredness that she had witnessed in secular academia. Some observers regarded her reputation as a feminist as being at odds with her conversion, but she found it to be "wholly consistent." She wrote, "Sad as it may seem, my experience with radical, upscale feminism only reinforced my growing mistrust of individual pride."

Fox-Genovese died in 2007, aged 65, in Atlanta. She had lived with multiple sclerosis for 15 years. The following year, Eugene Genovese published a tribute to his wife, Miss Betsey: A Memoir of Marriage.

== Scholarship ==
Fox-Genovese's academic interests changed from French history to the history of women in the United States before the American Civil War. Virginia Shadron, assistant dean at Emory, later said that Fox-Genovese's Within the Plantation Household (1988) cemented her reputation as a scholar of women in the Old South. Contemporary reviews praised it; one described her work as bridging "the gap between the study of individual identity and the economic and social milieu." Mechal Sobel of The New York Times wrote, "Elizabeth Fox-Genovese undertakes the enormous tasks of telling the life stories of the last generation of black and white women of the Old South, and of analyzing the meanings of these connected stories as a way of illuminating both Southern and women's history—tasks at which she succeeds brilliantly."

This book received the following awards:

- 1988 C. Hugh Holman Award, Society for the Study of Southern Literature
- 1989 Julia Cherry Spruill Prize, Southern Association for Women Historians
- 1989 Outstanding Book Award, Gustavus Myers Center for the Study of Bigotry and Human Rights in North America

Fox-Genovese also wrote scholarly and popular works on feminism. Through her writings, she alienated many feminists but attracted many women who may have considered themselves conservative feminists. Princeton University history professor Sean Wilentz said, "She probably did more for the conservative women's movement than anyone... [Her] voice came from inside the academy and updated the ideas of the conservative women's movement. She was one of their most influential intellectual forces." Fox-Genovese reportedly had no patience with the cultural feminist trend of viewing women and men as possessing completely different values, and she criticized the idea that women's natural instincts and experience of oppression gave them a superior capacity for justice and mercy. For this, she had been labeled by Cathy Young as an "antifeminist".

== Honors ==
- 2003, National Humanities Medal
- Cardinal Wright Award from the Fellowship of Catholic Scholars
- Doctor of Letters from Millsaps College
- C. Hugh Holman Prize from the Society for Southern Literature
- ACLS & Ford Foundation Fellowship

== Selected writings ==
- The Origins of Physiocracy: Economic Revolution and Social Order in Eighteenth-century France, Ithaca: Cornell University Press, 1976, ISBN 978-0-8014-1006-2.
- Fruits of Merchant Capital: Slavery and Bourgeois Property in the Rise and Expansion of Capitalism, New York/ York: Oxford University Press, 1983. ISBN 978-0-19-503157-7 (with Eugene D. Genovese)
- Within the Plantation Household: Black and White Women of the Old South, series on Gender and American Culture, Chapel Hill, NC: University of North Carolina Press, 1988. ISBN 978-0-8078-4232-4
- Feminism Without Illusions: A Critique of Individualism, University of North Carolina Press, 1991. ISBN 978-0-8078-4372-7
- "Feminism Is Not the Story of My Life": How Today's Feminist Elite Has Lost Touch with the Real Concerns of Women, Anchor reprint, 1996 ISBN 978-0-385-46791-9
- The Mind of the Master Class: History and Faith in the Southern Slaveholders' Worldview Cambridge University Press, 2005. ISBN 978-0-521-61562-4 (with Eugene D. Genovese)

Posthumous publications

- Marriage: The Dream that Refuses to Die, Wilmington, DE: ISI Books, 2008. ISBN 978-1-933859-62-0
- Slavery in White and Black: Class and Race in the Southern Slaveholders' New World Order, Cambridge University Press, 2008. ISBN 978-0-521-89700-6 (with Eugene D. Genovese
- History and Women, Culture and Faith: Selected Writings, University of South Carolina Press, 2011 (5 vols.)
