= Stanley Elkins =

American historian (1925–2013)

- Born: Stanley Maurice Elkins; April 27, 1925; Boston, Massachusetts, U.S.
- Died: September 16, 2013 (aged 88); Leeds, Massachusetts, U.S.

Academic background
- Education: Harvard University; Columbia University

Academic work
- Discipline: History
- Institutions: Smith College; University of Chicago

Stanley Maurice Elkins (April 27, 1925 in Boston, Massachusetts – September 16, 2013 in Leeds, Massachusetts) was an American historian, best known for his unique and controversial comparison of slavery in the United States to Nazi concentration camps, and for his collaborations (in a book and numerous articles) with Eric McKitrick regarding the early American Republic. They together wrote The Age of Federalism, on the history of the founding fathers of America.

== Career ==
Elkins was born in Boston to Frank and Frances Elkins (née Reiner). He attended Boston English High School and enlisted in the U.S. Army in 1943, serving in the 362nd Infantry Regiment, fighting in France but primarily Italy during World War II. He served as initially a Scout and later a Prisoner Transport Guard (of German POWs). After the war, he married Dorothy Adele Lamken and attended Harvard University on the GI Bill (A.B. 1949), followed by Columbia University for graduate school in American history (M.A. 1951, Ph.D. 1958), where he studied under Richard Hofstadter. He and fellow graduate student Eric McKitrick received a joint appointment as assistant professors of history at the University of Chicago, where they taught from 1955 to 1960. In 1960 he joined the faculty at Smith College, where he was appointed the Sydenham Clark Parsons Professor Emeritus of History from 1969 until his death in 2013.

== Slavery: A Problem in American Institutional and Intellectual Life ==
Based on Elkins' doctoral dissertation at Columbia University, this work was theoretically innovative and enormously influential when first published, although largely superseded today. In it, Elkins made two major, and controversial, statements, the first being American abolitionists reduced their effectiveness by insisting on ideological consistency and purity, and refusing to compromise with the slave system. He argued British abolitionists were more pragmatic and thus effective, allowing them to abolish slavery without war.

He went on to contrast slavery in North America with that in Spanish America, suggesting it was more important to focus on the structures governing the institution, rather than its conditions. In North America, slaves were deprived of any legal rights, including the ability to marry or have a family, be protected from violence, own property or make a will. With the exception of Maryland and Kentucky, slave states even passed legislation making it illegal for anyone to teach slaves to read and write, or allow them to own books. The removal of personal rights and utter dependence on their owners resulted in what Elkins called "chattel slavery", which he contrasted with the system prevailing in Spanish America. Although conditions could be just as harsh, slaves generally had a variety of legal rights, including the ability to use the court system, purchase their freedom or contract their labour out to others.

In addition, slavery in North America was almost exclusively a black experience, while in Spanish America it began as a "misfortune" that could happen to anyone who fell into debt. As a result, "chattel slavery" had a lasting impact on how black Americans viewed themselves and how they were perceived by wider society. Then-recent research by Bruno Bettelheim and others on inmates of Nazi concentration camps during World War II showed their totalitarian environment systematically destroyed the ability of inmates to resist, plan or form positive relationships with one another. Elkins suggested pre-Civil War slavery was a similar environment, views that were influential in the late 1960s when politicians like Daniel Patrick Moynihan supported affirmative action programs as a way to counteract the longterm impact of slavery on black culture.

His arguments have since been heavily criticised, particularly for his use of the racial slur "Sambo" to describe the allegedly "infantilised" state which black Americans were reduced to by slavery. In addition, critics point out Elkins provided no data or methodology for his comparison between WWII concentration camp victims, largely white Europeans, and black Americans. Initially heralded by the black community as an important and positive contribution, this comparison was considered offensive by descendants of both groups. Finally, it is suggested his criticism of American abolitionists ignores the reality of the society within which they operated, since every attempt made to achieve partial reform was blocked. The controversy is discussed in more detail in a collection of essays by Ann Lane, and also by historian John Wesley Blassingame.

== The Age of Federalism ==
The Age of Federalism: The Early Republic, 1788-1800, co-authored by Elkins and Eric McKitrick, was described as a "dazzling book," featuring an "elegant and penetrating pen portrait of Hamilton."The Age of Federalism won the Bancroft Prize. The book explores the history of the Federalist party, discusses the relationships among key players, among them Thomas Jefferson, John Jay, and Alexander Hamilton, and analyzes the administrations of George Washington and John Adams.

== Awards and fellowships ==
- 1954–55 Rockefeller Foundation Fellow
- 1959–60 Rockefeller Foundation Grant
- 1963–64 American Council of Learned Societies Fellowship
- 1967–68 National Endowment for the Humanities Grant
- 1970–71 Guggenheim Fellow
- 1970–71 Fellow, Institute for Advanced Study, Princeton
- 1980 Visiting Fellow, St. Catherine's College, Oxford
- 1994 Bancroft Prize
- 1995 Order of Cincinnatus Prize

== Published works ==
=== Books ===
- Stanley M. Elkins (1976). Slavery: A Problem in American Institutional and Intellectual Life. University of Chicago Press. ISBN 978-0-226-20477-2. (1959, 1963, 1976 editions) reviews
- Stanley M. Elkins; Eric L. McKitrick (1993). The Age of Federalism: The Early American Republic, 1788–1800. Oxford University Press. ISBN 978-0-19-506890-0.
- Cecelia M. Kenyon (2003). Stanley M. Elkins; Eric L. McKitrick (eds.). Men of Little Faith: Selected Writings of Cecelia Kenyon. University of Massachusetts Press. ISBN 978-1-55849-347-6.

=== Articles ===
- Stanley M. Elkins and Eric L. McKitrick. "A Meaning for Turner's Frontier: Part I: Democracy in the Old Northwest," Political Science Quarterly, Vol. 69, No. 3 (Sep., 1954), pp. 321–353 in JSTOR
- Stanley M. Elkins and Eric L. McKitrick, "A Meaning for Turner's Frontier: Part II: The Southwest Frontier and New England," Political Science Quarterly, Vol. 69, No. 4 (Dec., 1954), pp. 565–602 in JSTOR
- Stanley M. Elkins and Eric L. McKitrick, "Institutions and the Law of Slavery: The Dynamics of Unopposed Capitalism," American Quarterly, Vol. 9, No. 1 (Spring, 1957), pp. 3–21 in JSTOR
- Stanley Elkins and Eric L. McKitrick, "Institutions and the Law of Slavery: Slavery in Capitalist and Non-Capitalist Cultures," American Quarterly, Vol. 9, No. 2, Part 1 (Summer, 1957), pp. 159–179 in JSTOR
- Stanley M. Elkins and Eric L. McKitrick, "The Founding Fathers: Young Men of the Revolution," Political Science Quarterly, Vol. 76, No. 2 (Jun., 1961), pp. 181–216 in JSTOR

== Bibliography ==
- Budick, E. Miller. "Plantations and Pogroms, Slavery and the Holocaust: Disentangling Black and Jewish History (Stanley Elkins, Ralph Waldo Ellison, and Hannah Arendt)." In Blacks and Jews in Literary Conversation (1998).
- Fermaglich, Kirsten. "'One of the Lucky Ones': Stanley Elkins and the Concentration Camp Analogy in Slavery." In American Dreams and Nazi Nightmares: Early Holocaust Consciousness and Liberal America, 1957-1965 (2007).
- George M. Fredrickson (1988). "The Historiography of Slavery: Stanley Elkins to Herbert Gutman". The arrogance of race: historical perspectives on slavery, racism, and social inequality. Wesleyan University Press. p. 112. ISBN 978-0-8195-6217-3. "Stanley Elkins historian."
- King, Richard H. "Domination and Fabrication: Re-thinking Stanley Elkins' Slavery," Slavery & Abolition, Vol. 22, No. 2 (2001), pp. 1–28.
- Kolchin, Peter. "Reevaluating the Antebellum Slave Community: A Comparative Perspective." The Journal of American History, Vol. 70, No. 3 (December, 1983).
- Lane, Ann, ed. The Debate Over "Slavery": Stanley Elkins and His Critics. Urbana: University of Illinois Press, 1971. Essays by 13 scholars.
- Wyatt-Brown, Bertram. "Stanley Elkins and Northern Reform Culture." In Yankee Saints and Southern Sinners (1986, 1990).
- Wyatt-Brown, Bertram. "Stanley Elkins' Slavery: The Antislavery Interpretation Reexamined." American Quarterly, Vol. 25, No. 2 (May, 1973), pp. 154–176 in JSTOR
