= Frank Tannenbaum =

Austrian–American historian, sociologist, and criminologist

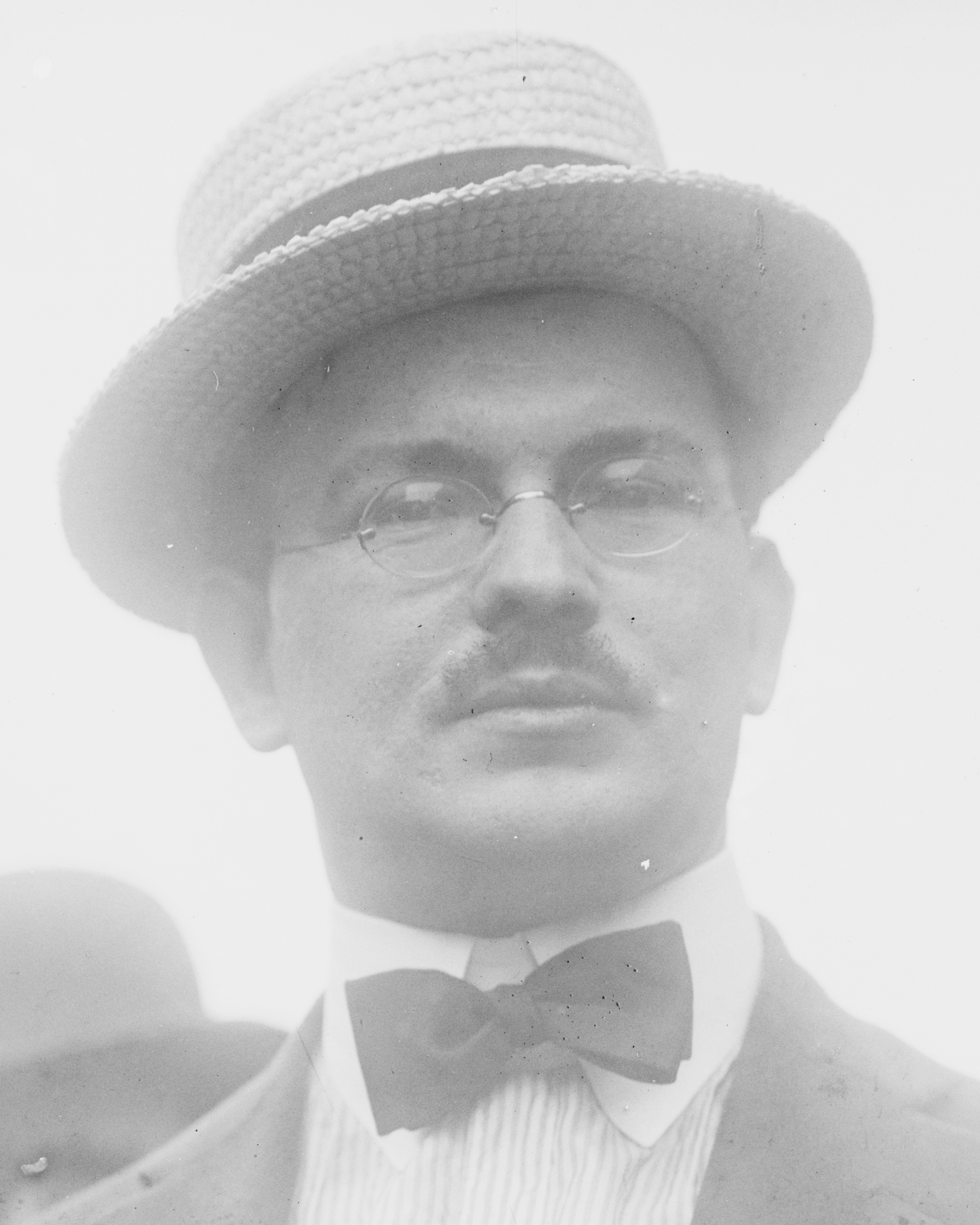
- Tannenbaum, c. 1915
- Born: March 4, 1893
- Died: June 1, 1969 (aged 76)
- Education: Columbia University, Brookings Institution
- Occupations: historian, sociologist, criminologist
- Years active: 1931–1965
- Known for: Farm Security Administration

Frank Tannenbaum (March 4, 1893 – June 1, 1969) was an Austrian-American historian, sociologist and criminologist, who made significant contributions to modern Mexican history during his career at Columbia University.

== Early life ==
Tannenbaum was born in Austria on 4 March 1893. His Eastern European Jewish family immigrated to the United States in 1905. He ran away from home as an adolescent and never finished high school. He worked at a number of menial jobs and became involved in radical labor politics of the era.

As a young man, he worked a busboy. During the economic crisis of 1913–1915, he became a leader of the Industrial Workers of the World. In January 1914, Tannenbaum, then 21 years old and a member of the IWW-affiliated Waiter's Industrial Union, proposed a campaign of demanding relief from New York City churches. Starting in February, he led masses of workers to churches, disrupted services, and demanded that they be given food and shelter. Although most churches complied, the New York press, notably The New York Times, decried Tannenbaum and the Wobblies. On March 4, Tannenbaum led a group of unemployed workers from Rutgers Square to the Catholic St. Alphonsus Church on West Broadway. There, they were met by a phalanx of police and the parish rector, who refused their demands. Tannenbaum and 190 other protesters were arrested; Tannenbaum was charged with inciting to riot and given an extraordinary $5,000 bail. At trial one protester received 60 days in jail, four 30 days, three 15 days, and the rest were let go; Tannenbaum was sent to jail for a year and fined $500. He spent the year on Blackwell's Island. When he got out of jail, Tannenbaum remained active in the IWW, and he was arrested alongside Elizabeth Gurley Flynn and Alexander Berkman during the Bayonne refinery strikes of 1915–1916, in Bayonne, New Jersey.

Emma Goldman described his arrest and imprisonment in her memoirs, Living My Life (1931):

We all had loved Frank for his wide-awakeness and his unassuming ways. He had spent much of his free time in our office, reading and helping in the work connected with Mother Earth. His fine qualities held out the hope that Frank would some day play an important part in the labour struggle. None of us had expected however that our studious, quiet friend would so quickly respond to the call of the hour.

After Bayonne, Tannenbaum soon abandoned his youthful radicalism.

== Academic career ==
With the help of several philanthropists, he attended Columbia University, where classmates included Samuel Roth. In 1921, Tannenbaum received his bachelor's degree from Columbia. At Columbia, Tannenbaum was a member of the Philolexian Society; he addressed the Society on prison reform in March 1916 while an undergraduate. Six years later, he received his Ph.D. in economics from the Brookings Institution, with a dissertation on land reform in Mexico. He then served in the U.S. Army, stationed in the south.

He then moved to Mexico, where he conducted research on rural education and served as an adviser to President Lázaro Cárdenas.

In 1931, he reported to the Wickersham Commission study on Penal Institutions, Probation and Parole (Volume 9).

In 1932, he returned to the United States to teach criminology at Cornell University.

In 1935 he joined the faculty at Columbia, where he became professor of Latin American history. A notable student at Columbia was Robert J. Alexander, who went on to become professor of history at Rutgers University, specializing in the trade union movement in Latin America and dissident communist political parties.

In 1944, Tannenbaum was instrumental in proposing the Columbia University Seminars format; a group of Columbia faculty, other faculty, and students who gathered together in discussion of issues on compelling topics such as peace and war, and other general subjects of concern. He participated in the Seminar on Government in February - May 1945 with J.H. Randall Jr., and Herbert W. Schneider with his essays "The Coordinate State" and "The Balance of Power in Society," published in his book of the same title. Twenty years after, his book on the Columbia Seminars was published in 1965, A Community of Scholars, and 39 seminars were conducted by that time.

He was a member of the Citizens Committee for a Free Cuba, founded in 1963.

He retired from Columbia University in 1965. He died in New York City in 1969 after prolonged illness. His wife died years prior.

== Legacy ==
Tannenbaum helped formulate legislation that established the Farm Security Administration.

His conception of the "Dramatization Of Evil" led to the further development of the symbolic interactionist labeling theory, widely used in both sociology and social psychology.

Summarizing this theory's impact, Kerry Townsend has stated, "Frank Tannenbaum’s theory, dramatization of evil, explains the making of a criminal and the lure of criminal behavior." Townsend places Tannenbaum's theoretical thought within the theory of "Symbolic Interactionism," whose perspective emphasizes "individual levels of interaction, began to emerge spearheaded by the writings of George Herbert Mead and Charles Horton Cooley," which formed the basis of Societal Reaction theories of which Tannenbaum's form part.

Tannenbaum's theory remains important in criminology studies at universities including Florida State University, the University of Maryland

== Works ==
- The Labor Movement: Its Conservative Functions and Social, Consequences. G.P. Putnam's Sons: New York, 1921
- Wall Shadows: A Study in American Prisons. G.P. Putnam's Sons: New York, 1922 (And Thomas M.Osborne)
- Darker Phases of The South. G.P. Putnam's Sons & Archon Books: New York, 1924
- The Mexican Agrarian Revolution. The Macmillan Company: New York, 1930
- Place by Revolution: An Interpretation of México, drawings by Miguel Covarrubias. Columbia University Press: New York, 1933
- Osborne of Sing Sing. University of North Carolina Press: Chapel Hill, 1933
- Whither Latin America? An Introduction to its Economic and Social Problems. Thomas Y. Crowell Co... : New York, 1934
- Crime and the Community. Columbia University Press: New York, 1938
- Slave and Citizen: The Negro in the Americas. Vintage Books: New York, 1947
- The Balance of Power in Society: And Other Essays. The Macmillan Company: New York,1946
- Mexico: The Struggle for Peace and Bread. Alfred A Knopf: New York, 1950
- A Philosophy of Labor. Alfred A Knopf: New York, 1951
- The American Tradition in Foreign Policy. University of Oklahoma Press: Oklahoma City,1955
- Ten Keys to Latin America. Vintage Books: New York, 1962
- A Community of Scholars; the University Seminars at Columbia. New York, 1965

== See also ==
- Samuel Roth
- Robert J. Alexander
