= The Slave Community =

1972 book by John W. Blassingame

- First edition
- Author: John W. Blassingame
- Language: English
- Subject: Slavery in the United States; History of the Southern United States
- Published: 1972 (Oxford University Press); 1979 (rev. ed.)
- Publication place: United States
- Media type: Print (Hardcover & Paperback)
- Pages: 262; 414 (rev. ed.)
- ISBN: 978-0-19-502562-0 (rev. ed. hardback); 978-0-19-502563-7 (rev. ed. paperback)
- Dewey Decimal: 975/.004/96073
- LC Class: E443 .B55 1979

The Slave Community: Plantation Life in the Antebellum South is a book written by American historian John W. Blassingame. Published in 1972, it is one of the first historical studies of slavery in the United States to be presented from the perspective of the enslaved. The Slave Community contradicted those historians who had interpreted history to suggest that African-American slaves were docile and submissive "Sambos" who enjoyed the benefits of a paternalistic master–slave relationship on southern plantations. Using psychology, Blassingame analyzes fugitive slave narratives published in the 19th century to conclude that an independent culture developed among the enslaved and that there were a variety of personality types exhibited by slaves.

Although the importance of The Slave Community was recognized by scholars of American slavery, Blassingame's conclusions, methodology, and sources were heavily criticized. Historians criticized the use of slave narratives that were seen as unreliable and biased. They questioned Blassingame's decision to exclude the more than 2,000 interviews with former slaves conducted by the Works Progress Administration (WPA) in the 1930s. Historians argued that Blassingame's use of psychological theory proved unhelpful in his interpretation. Blassingame defended his conclusions at a 1976 meeting of the Association for the Study of Afro-American Life and History and in 1979 published a revised and enlarged edition of The Slave Community. Despite criticisms, The Slave Community is a foundational text in the study of the life and culture of slaves in the Antebellum South.

== Historiographic background ==
Ulrich Bonnell Phillips wrote the first major historical study of the 20th century dealing with slavery. In American Negro Slavery (1918), Phillips refers to slaves as "negroes, who for the most part were by racial quality submissive rather than defiant, light-hearted instead of gloomy, amiable and ingratiating instead of sullen, and whose very defects invited paternalism rather than repression." American Negro Slavery is infused with racial rhetoric and upholds perceptions about the inferiority of black people common in the southern United States at the time. Although African American academics such as W. E. B. Du Bois criticized Phillips's depiction of slaves, the book was considered the authoritative text on slavery in America until the 1950s.

Phillips's interpretation of slavery was challenged by Kenneth M. Stampp in The Peculiar Institution: Slavery in the Ante-Bellum South (1956) and Stanley M. Elkins in Slavery: A Problem in American Institutional and Intellectual Life (1958). Stampp's study lacks the racist interpretation found in American Negro Slavery and approaches the issue from the position that there is no innate difference between blacks and whites. He questions the reality of plantation paternalism described by Phillips: "the reality of ante-bellum paternalism ... needs to be separated from its fanciful surroundings and critically analyzed." Elkins also dismisses Phillips's claim that African American slaves were innately submissive "Sambos". He argues that slaves had instead been infantilized, or "made" into Sambos, by the brutal treatment received at the hands of slaveowners and overseers. Elkins compares the process to the infantilization of Jews in Nazi concentration camps.

Like Phillips, Stampp and Elkins relied on plantation records and the writings of slaveowners as their main primary sources. Stampp admits that "few ask what the slaves themselves thought of bondage." Historians dismissed the written works of slaves such as the 19th century fugitive slave narratives as unreliable and biased because of their editing by abolitionists. Scholars also ignored the 2,300 interviews conducted with former slaves in the late 1930s by the WPA Federal Writers' Project. As historian George P. Rawick points out, more weight was often given to white sources: the "masters not only ruled the past in fact" but also "rule its written history."

The 1970s, however, witnessed the publication of revisionist studies that departed from the traditional historiography of slavery. Focusing on the perspective of the slave, new studies incorporated the slave narratives and WPA interviews: George Rawick's From Sunup to Sundown: The Making of the Black Community (1972), Eugene D. Genovese's Roll, Jordan, Roll: The World the Slaves Made (1974), Peter H. Wood, Black Majority: Negroes in Colonial South Carolina from 1670 Through the Stono Rebellion (1974), Leslie Howard Owens's This Species of Property: Slave Life and Culture in the Old South (1976), Herbert G. Gutman's The Black Family in Slavery and Freedom, 1750–1925 (1976), Lawrence W. Levine's Black Culture and Black Consciousness: Afro-American Folk Thought from Slavery to Freedom (1977), and Albert J. Raboteau's Slave Religion: The "Invisible Institution" in the Antebellum South (1978). One of the more controversial of these studies was John W. Blassingame's The Slave Community.

== Blassingame's argument ==
In The Slave Community, Blassingame argues that "historians have never systematically explored the life experiences of American slaves." He asserts that by concentrating on the slaveowner, historians have presented a distorted view of plantation life that "strips the slave of any meaningful and distinctive culture, family life, religion, or manhood." Blassingame outlines that the reliance on planter sources led historians like Elkins to mimic planter stereotypes of slaves such as the "submissive half-man, half child" Sambo. Noting the agency slaves possessed over their lives, he contends, "Rather than identifying with and submitting totally to his master, the slave held onto many remnants of his African culture, gained a sense of worth in the quarters, spent most of his time free from surveillance by whites, controlled important aspects of his life, and did some personally meaningful things on his own volition."

=== African cultural retention and slave culture ===
According to Blassingame, African culture was not entirely removed from slave culture through the process of enslavement and "was much more resistant to the bludgeons that was slavery than historians have hitherto suspected." "African survivals" persisted in the form of folk tales, religion and spirituality, music and dance, and language. He asserts that the retention of African culture acted as a form of resistance to enslavement: "All things considered, the few Africans enslaved in seventeenth- and eighteenth-century America appear to have survived their traumatic experiences without becoming abjectly docile, infantile, or submissive" and "since an overwhelming percentage of nineteenth-century Southern slaves were native Americans, they never underwent this kind of shock [the Middle Passage] and were in a position to construct psychological defenses against total dependency on their masters."

Blassingame asserts that historians have discussed "what could be generally described as slave 'culture,' but give little solid information on life in the quarters." He argues that culture developed within the slave community independent of the slaveowners' influence. Blassingame notes, "Antebellum black slaves created several unique cultural forms which lightened their burden of oppression, promoted group solidarity, provided ways for verbalizing aggression, sustaining hope, building self-esteem, and often represented areas of life largely free from the control of whites."

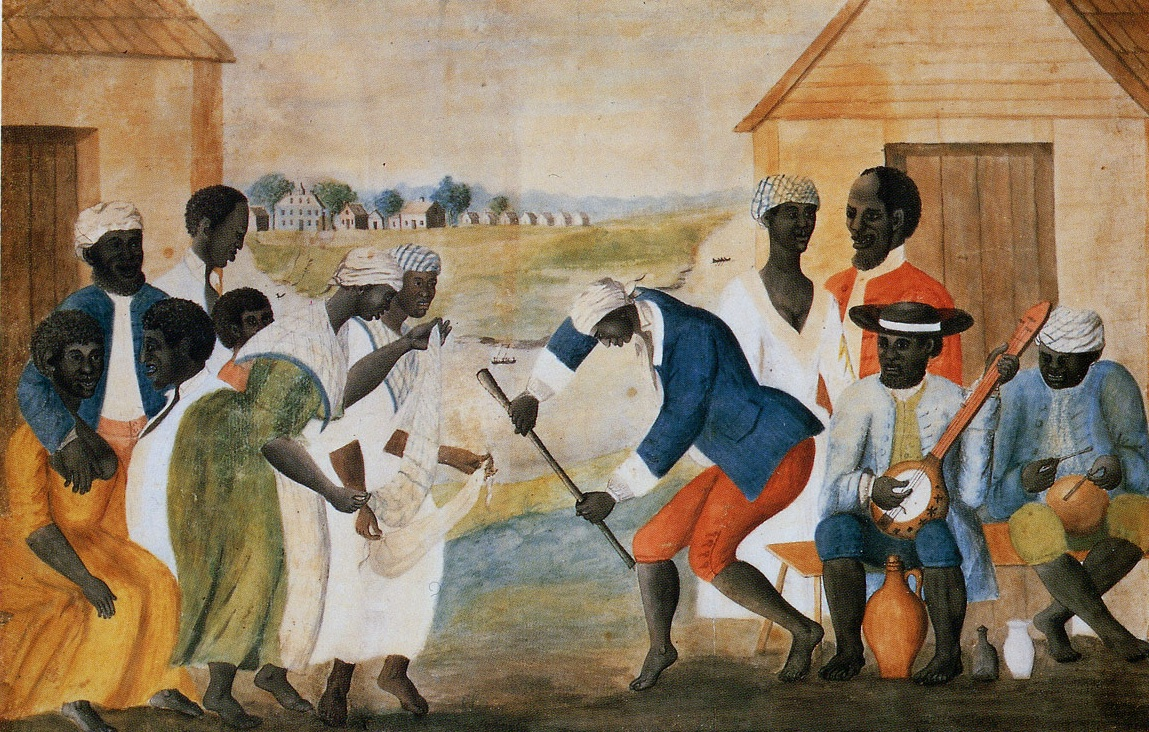
Blassingame argues slave music and dance (depicted here in The Old Plantation) represented forms of resistance and examples of African cultural retention

Blassingame notes that many of the folk tales told by slaves have been traced by African scholars to Ghana, Senegal, and Mauritania to peoples such as the Ewe, Wolof, Hausa, Temne, Ashanti, and Igbo. He remarks, "While many of these tales were brought over to the South, the African element appears most clearly in the animal tales." One prominent example discussed by Blassingame is the Ewe story of "Why the Hare Runs Away", which is a trickster and tar-baby tale told by southern slaves and later recorded by writer Joel Chandler Harris in his Uncle Remus stories. Southern slaves often included African animals like elephants, lions, and monkeys as characters in their folk tales.

As Christian missionaries and slaveowners attempted to erase African religious and spiritual beliefs, Blassingame argues that "in the United States, many African religious rites were fused into one—voodoo." Voodoo priests and conjurers promised slaves that they could make masters kind, harm enemies, ensure love, and heal sickness. Other religious survivals noted by Blassingame include funeral rites, grave decorating, and ritualistic dancing and singing.

Slaveowners and state governments tried to prevent slaves from making or playing musical instruments because of the use of drums to signal the Stono Rebellion in 1739. Blassingame, however, points out that in spite of restrictions, slaves were able to build a strong musical tradition drawing on their African heritage. Music, songs, and dances were similar to those performed or played in Africa. Instruments reproduced by slaves include drums, three-stringed banjos, gourd rattles, and mandolins.

Still, Blassingame concludes that cross-cultural exchanges occurred on southern plantations, arguing that "acculturation in the United States involved the mutual interaction between two cultures, with Europeans and Africans borrowing from each other." Blassingame asserts that the most significant instance revolved around Protestant Christianity (primarily Baptist and Methodist churches): "The number of blacks who received religious instruction in antebellum white churches is significant because the church was the only institution other than the plantation which played a major role in acculturating the slave." Christianity and enslaved black ministers slowly replaced African religious survivals and represented another aspect of slave culture which the slaves used to create their own communities. While ministers preached obedience in the presence of the slaveowners and other whites, slaves often met in secret, "invisible" services unsupervised by whites. In these "invisible churches", slaves could discuss freedom, liberty, and the judgment of God against slaveowners.

=== Slave families ===
Slave marriages were illegal in southern states, and slave couples were frequently separated by slaveowners through sale. Blassingame grants that slaveowners did have control over slave marriages. They encouraged monogamous relationships to "make it easier to discipline their slaves. ... A black man, they reasoned, who loved his wife and his children was less likely to be rebellious or to run away than would a 'single' slave." Blassingame notes that when a slave couple resided on the same plantation, the husband witnessed the whipping and raping of his wife and the sale of his children. He remarks, "Nothing demonstrated his powerlessness as much as the slave's inability to prevent the forcible sale of his wife and children."

Nevertheless, Blassingame argues that "however frequently the family was broken it was primarily responsible for the slave's ability to survive on the plantation without becoming totally dependent on and submissive to his master." He contends:

While the form of family life in the quarters differed radically from that among free Negroes and whites, this does not mean it failed to perform many of the traditional functions of the family—the rearing of children being one of the most important of these functions. Since slave parents were primarily responsible for training their children, they could cushion the shock of bondage for them, help them to understand their situation, teach them values different from those their masters tried to instill in them, and give them a referent for self-esteem other than the master.

Blassingame asserts that slave parents attempted to shield infants and young children from the brutality of the plantation. When children understood that they were enslaved (usually after their first whipping), parents dissuaded angry urges to run away or seek revenge.

Children observed fathers demonstrating two behavioral types. In the quarters, he "acted like a man", castigating whites for the mistreatment of himself and his family; in the field working for the master, he appeared obedient and submissive. According to Blassingame, "Sometimes children internalized both the true personality traits and the contradictory behavioral patterns of their parents." He believes that children recognized submissiveness as a convenient method to avoid punishment and the behavior in the quarters as the true behavioral model. Blassingame concludes, "In [the slave father's] family, the slave not only learned how to avoid the blows of the master, but also drew on the love and sympathy of its members to raise his spirits. The family was, in short, an important survival mechanism."

=== Personality types ===
Blassingame identifies three stereotypes in the literature of the antebellum south:

- Sambo was a combination of the Uncle Remus, Jim Crow, and Uncle Tom figures who represented the faithful, submissive, and superstitious slave.
- Jack worked faithfully until he was mistreated, then he became uncooperative and occasionally rebellious. Rationally analyzing the white man's overwhelming physical power, Jack either avoided contact with him or was deferential in his presence.
- Nat was the perpetual runaway and rebellious slave feared by slaveowners. Named after Nat Turner, the Nat character retaliated against slaveowners and was subdued and punished only when overcome by greater numbers.

Directly challenging Elkins's infantilization thesis, Blassingame argues that historians have focused too much on the Sambo personality type and the role of paternalism. "The Sambo stereotype was so pervasive in antebellum Southern literature that many historians, without further research, argue that it was an accurate description of the dominant slave personality."

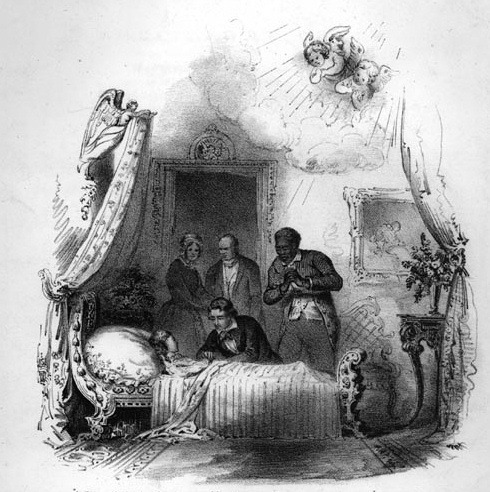
Blassingame argues that the loyal and devoted slave was less common than historians previously believed

According to Blassingame, the Sambo figure evolved from white Americans' attitudes toward Africans and African Americans as innately barbaric, passive, superstitious, and childlike. Southern writers felt a need to defend slavery from allegations of abuse and brutality leveled by northern abolitionists, so Sambo became a common portrayal to justify and explain the need for plantation paternalism. Finally, slaveowners used the Sambo stereotype to alleviate their own fears and anxieties about the potential rebelliousness of their slaves. Blassingame remarks, "In this regard, Nat, the actual and potential rebel, stands at the core of white perceptions of the slave. With Nat perennially in the wings, the creation of Sambo was almost mandatory for the Southerner's emotional security. Like a man whistling in the dark to bolster his courage, the white man had to portray the slave as Sambo."

Despite slaveowner paternalism and charges of submissiveness, Blassingame contends, "There is overwhelming evidence, in the primary sources, of the Negro's resistance to his bondage and of his undying love for freedom." Blassingame outlines efforts of slaves to run away and rebel, particularly the Stono Rebellion of 1739, Charles Deslondes's revolt in 1811, Nat Turner's revolt of 1831, and the participation of fugitive slaves in Florida fighting with Seminoles during the Seminole Wars. Blassingame concludes that the Sambo and Nat stereotypes "were real." He explains, "The more fear whites had of Nat, the more firmly tried to believe in Sambo in order to escape paranoia."

Blassingame concludes that there were a variety of personality types exhibited by slaves positioned on a scale between the two extremes of Sambo and Nat. He argues that variations present in plantations, overseers, and masters gave the slave "much more freedom from restraint and more independence and autonomy than his institutionally defined role allowed. Consequently, the slave did not have to be infantile or abjectly docile in order to remain alive." Blassingame compares slavery on southern plantations to the treatment of prisoners in Nazi concentration camps in an effort to demonstrate that "the most important factor in causing infantilism, total dependency, and docility in the camps was the real threat of death which left few, if any, alternatives for the inmates." He remarks, "Placed on a continuum of total institutions, the concentration camp is far removed from the Southern plantation." According to Blassingame, the goal of the irrationally organized and understaffed plantation was not the systematic torture and extermination of its laborers, who were "worth more than a bullet".

== Methodology and sources ==
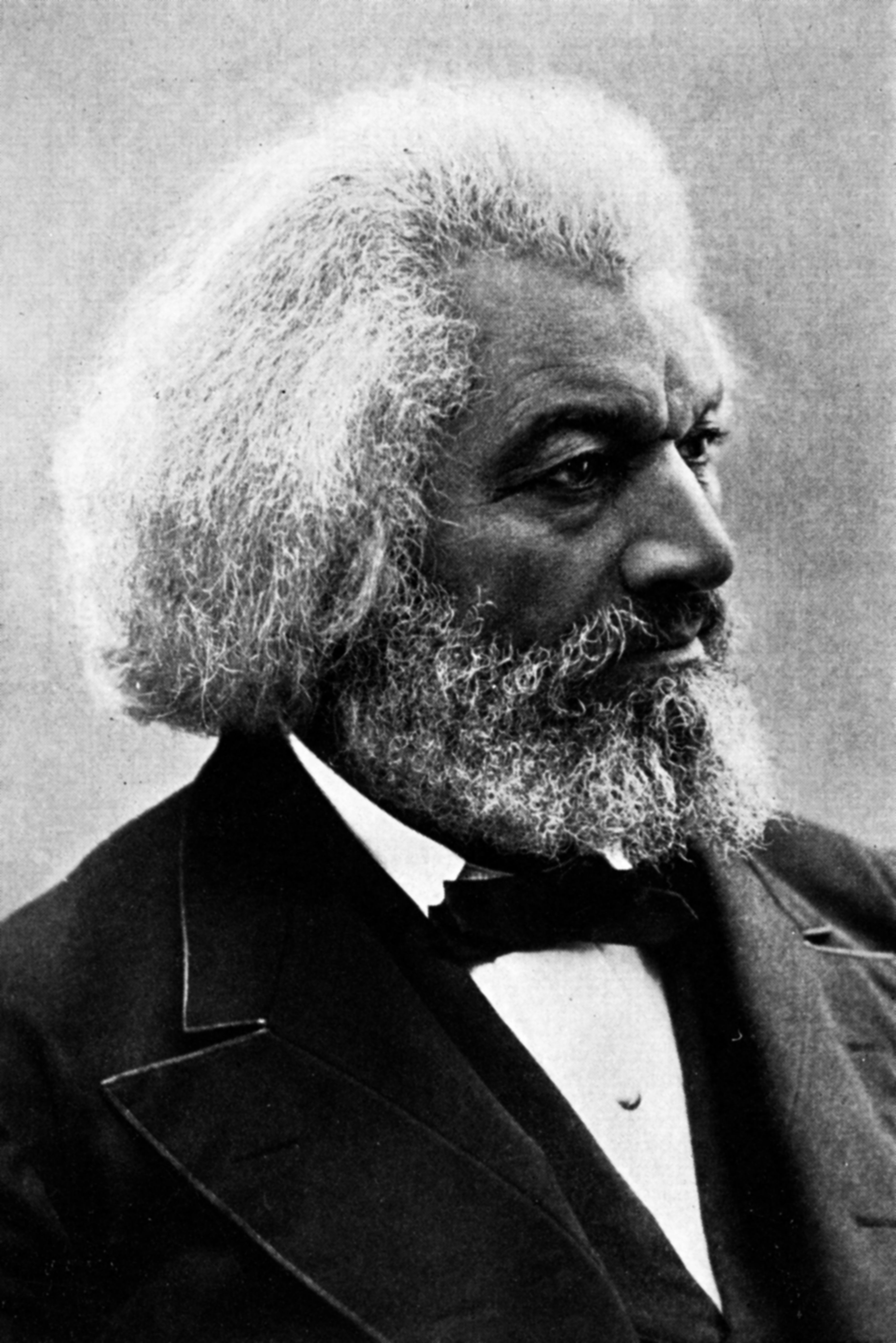
Blassingame based The Slave Community on the autobiographies of former slaves, such as Frederick Douglass's My Bondage and My Freedom (1855)

In The Slave Community, Blassingame uses psychologist Harry Stack Sullivan's interpersonal theory to interpret the behavior of slaves on antebellum plantations. Sullivan claims that "significant others", persons with the most power to reward and punish individual behavior, were primarily responsible for determining behavior. Interpersonal theorists argue that "behavioral patterns are determined by the characteristics of the situation, how the person perceives them, and his behavioral dispositions at the time." The most important component of personality is self-esteem. Blassingame explains, "Our sense of self-esteem is heightened or lowered by our perception of the images others have of us." Interpersonal behavior revolves around the dominant-submissive axes: "One form of behavior tends to elicit its complement: dominance leads to submission and vice versa. The extent of submissiveness often depends on the structure of the group to which the person belongs."

Another psychological theory used by Blassingame is role theory. According to this theory, "a person's behavior is generally determined by the socially defined roles or the behavioral patterns expected of him in certain situations." Blassingame asserts that through applying interpersonal and role theory to the fugitive slave narratives, historians can determine "the extent to which slaves acted the way their masters expected them to behave" and how the Sambo, Jack, and Nat personality types can be misleading.

Blassingame contends that historians have "deliberately ignored" autobiographies of ex-slaves, particularly the fugitive slave narratives. "Consequently", argues Blassingame, "a great deal of emphasis has been placed on non-traditional sources in this study in an effort to delineate more clearly the slave's view of bondage and to discover some new insights into the workings of the system." He relies heavily on narratives by Henry Bibb, Henry Clay Bruce, Elizabeth Keckley, Samuel Hall, Solomon Northup, Charles Ball, Jermain Wesley Loguen, William Wells Brown, John Brown, Robert Anderson, William Grimes, Austin Steward, and Frederick Douglass. Blassingame's discussion of the African slave trade, Middle Passage, and African culture is based on Olaudah Equiano's The Interesting Narrative of the Life of Olaudah Equiano, or Gustavus Vassa, the African (1794).

Rather than accepting the fugitive slave narratives without question, Blassingame admits to scrutinizing his reading of the texts. He notes that arguments against the use of these autobiographies used by historians revolve around reliability: "Many historians refuse to use these accounts because they have felt the fugitive, as the primary sufferer in the institution, was unable to give an objective account of bondage." Still, Blassingame defends his reliance on autobiographies, noting, "The portrait of the institution of slavery which emerges from the narratives is not the simple picture of hell on earth that most historians have led us to believe they contain. Instead, the fugitives' plantations are peopled with the same range of heroes and villains, black and white, which one generally finds in the human race." Therefore, Blassingame concludes:

Like most personal documents, the autobiography provides a window to the larger world. In this sense, the slave writers present a participant observers' comments on the larger slave society. As an eyewitness, the autobiographer brings the historian into contact with almost all kinds of slaves. When the autobiographies are accepted both as records of the unique experiences of each individual author and as eyewitness accounts of several slave communities, they are clearly "representative".

Besides fugitive slave narratives, Blassingame uses abolitionist periodicals such as The Liberator, National Anti-Slavery Standard, Pennsylvania Freeman, Anti-Slavery Bugle, and Genius of Universal Emancipation. According to Blassingame, these periodicals printed slave interviews, letters, and autobiographies, but "gave even more coverage to white Southerners than to slaves and frequently reprinted articles, letters, and proceedings from a large number of Southern newspapers".

A primary source that Blassingame did not consult in his study was the WPA slave interviews. While he admits that "slave interviews rival autobiographies in their revelations about the internal dynamics of bondage, ... the heavy editing of the WPA interviews makes them far more difficult to utilize than black autobiographies." He elaborates on his criticism of the interviews in a 1975 article in the Journal of Southern History. He describes how white interviewers often deleted material contrary to the paternalistic image of the antebellum South which they wanted to present. Blassingame concludes, "Uncritical use of the interviews will lead almost inevitably to a simplistic and distorted view of the plantation as a paternalistic institution where the chief feature of life was mutual love and respect between masters and slaves."

Blassingame builds on the historiography of Phillips, Stampp, and Elkins, but he acknowledges the influence of Charles S. Sydnor's Slavery in Mississippi (1933), Orville W. Taylor's Negro Slavery in Arkansas (1958), Eugene D. Genovese's The Political Economy of Slavery (1965), and Ann J. Lane's anthology of essays The Debate Over Slavery: Stanley Elkins and His Critics (1971).

== Reception and influence ==
The importance of The Slave Community as one of the first studies of slavery from the perspective of the slave was recognized by historians. The book nonetheless received heavy criticism by academics who disagreed with Blassingame's conclusions, methodology, and sources. Historian George P. Rawick noted in 1976, however, that the criticism "should not obscure the fact that [Blassingame's] book was of such merit as to warrant spending our time criticizing it four years after its publication. Yet, like many good books, it should have been better."

In The History Teacher, Keith Polakoff comments that "only with the publication of Blassingame's work do we obtain for the first time a detailed examination of the daily lives of the slaves on large plantations, with some intelligent speculation about the forces to which they were subjected. David Goldfield writes in Agricultural History that the book was the most impressive and balanced attempt to understand the slave's responses to plantation life to date. Carl N. Degler writes in the Washington Post that Blassingame's study comes "closer than any previous study to answering the question 'what was it like to be a slave?'"

Still, Blassingame's conclusions, methodology, and sources received substantial criticism from historians. Marian DeB. Kilson's review in the American Historical Review described Blassingame's aims as "imperfectly realized" because he "lacks a clear analytical perspective". She found his discussion of slave personality types "fascinating" and "his methodological aims ... important" but "not systematically pursued". Kilson believes that Blassingame ultimately failed in his analysis because "his intellectual integration of social and psychological orientations has yet to be fully achieved." Orville W. Taylor contends in the Journal of Negro History that Blassingame had a tendency to overgeneralize and make "unsubstantiatable claims to originality and uniqueness".

In the Journal of Political Economy, economic historian Stanley L. Engerman complains that the book is not "written by or for economists" and makes "limited use of economic analysis". He continues, "Given the concern with the 'personal autonomy' and culture of the slave, much of the book is devoted to the African heritage; to slave music, religion, and folklore; and to the discussion of the slave family and other personal relationships." Engerman concedes that The Slave Community "is a book written at a time of transition in the interpretation of slavery and black culture", but "the author at times seems unsure of the direction in which he is pointing." He concludes that Blassingame's "analysis is incomplete in its presentation of a different and more complex scene" even though he "effectively shows the difficulties of the concentration-camp image and the Sambo myth".

Historians criticized Blassingame for dismissing the WPA slave interviews and relying solely on fugitive slave narratives. In the Journal of American History, Willie Lee Rose writes that Blassingame's use of the fugitive slave narratives is marred by his neglect of the WPA interviews. Kenneth Wiggins Porter regards Blassingame's dependence on printed sources as a "major weakness" and believes he does not use enough white sources like plantation records and travel narratives, particularly Frederick Law Olmsted's account of life in the antebellum South. According to George Rawick, "We desperately need work that depicts and analyzes the lives of black women under slavery. We have had very largely a male-dominated literature about slavery." He notes, "Blassingame, unfortunately, does not help us at all in this task." Rawick surmises that if Blassingame had consulted the WPA slave interviews, he would have developed a picture of the "heroic struggles of black women on behalf of themselves and of the whole black community".

Historians exhibited varying responses to Blassingame's use of psychological theory. In a review in the William and Mary Quarterly, George Mullin is especially critical of Blassingame's use of psychology, stating that Blassingame "reduc[es] slave behavior and culture to a question of roles and psychological characteristics". He concludes that an "E. P. Thompson for the American Black community during slavery is still off-stage", and that the topic needs exploration by a social or economic historian. Rawick states that Blassingame's "first major error lies in adopting the very questionable deterministic social psychological role theories associated with ... Erving Goffman and Harry Stack Sullivan." He complains that it "parodies the basic complexity of the 'psychology' of the oppressed who simultaneously view themselves in socially negative terms while struggling against the view of themselves and their behavior". Rawick is convinced that Blassingame would have reached the same conclusions from the sources without the use of psychology "because the historical evidence as seen through an unadulterated commitment to the struggles of the slaves and an equally uncompromising hostility to the masters would have led him there." On the other hand, Eugene D. Genovese and Earl E. Thorpe praised Blassingame for his use of psychological theory, but admit they prefer Freudian and Marxist interpretations over Sullivanian theory.

=== Influence ===
In 1976, the Association for the Study of Afro-American Life and History met in Chicago and held a session on The Slave Community. Panelists included Mary Frances Berry, Herbert Gutman, Leslie Howard Owens, George Rawick, Earl Thorpe, and Eugene Genovese. Blassingame responded to questions and critiques from the panel. The discussion led to the publication of an anthology edited by Al-Tony Gilmore called Revisiting Blassingame's The Slave Community: The Scholars Respond (1978). The book includes essays by the panelists as well as James D. Anderson, Ralph D. Carter, John Henrik Clarke, and Stanley Engerman. Blassingame's essay, "Redefining The Slave Community: A Response to Critics" appears in the volume.

Since its publication in 1972 and revision in 1979, The Slave Community has influenced subsequent historiographical works on slavery in the United States. In a 1976 edition of Roll, Jordan, Roll, Eugene Genovese explains that Blassingame's book "demonstrates that the published accounts of runaway slaves can be illuminating". The authors of Reckoning with Slavery (1976) use Blassingame's findings to challenge the assertions of Robert William Fogel and Stanley Engerman in Time on the Cross: The Economics of American Negro Slavery (1974). In Slave Religion: The "Invisible Institution" in the Antebellum South (1978), Albert J. Raboteau comments, "We should speak of the 'invisibility' of slave religion with irony: it is the neglect of slave sources by historians which has been the main cause of this invisibility." Raboteau credits Blassingame and others for demonstrating the value of slave sources. Historian Charles Joyner's influential study Down by the Riverside: A South Carolina Slave Community (1984) is reinforced by the findings of The Slave Community and relies on similar evidence.

Historian Deborah Gray White builds on Blassingame's research of the family life of the slaves in Ar'n't I a Woman?: Female Slaves in the Plantation South (1985). Her argument is similar to Blassingame's: "This present study takes a look at slave women in America and argues that they were not submissive, subordinate, or prudish and that they were not expected to be so." White discusses the Mammy and Jezebel stereotypes often applied to African American women by white Americans. She calls The Slave Community "a classic" but remarks that "Blassingame stressed the fact that many masters recognized the male as the head of the family. He observed that during courtship men flattered women and exaggerated their prowess. There was, however, little discussion of the reciprocal activities of slave women." She concludes that Blassingame "described how slave men gained status in the family, but he did not do the same for women."

Elizabeth Fox-Genovese makes similar observations in Within the Plantation Household: Black and White Women of the Old South (1988). She notes that The Slave Community, like other historiography produced in the 1960s and 70s, "did not directly address women's history, even though many of the historians were sensitive to women's experience. Most of the male authors had done a large part of their work before the development of women's history as a discipline, and even the most sensitive were hampered by a paucity of sources and by unfamiliarity with the questions feminists would soon raise."

== Revised edition ==
After the 1976 Association for the Study of Afro-American Life and History meeting and the publication of Revisiting Blassingame's The Slave Community in 1978, Blassingame produced a revised and enlarged edition of The Slave Community in 1979. In the new preface, Blassingame asserted that the book had to be revised because of George Bentley, an enslaved, pro-slavery Primitive Baptist minister from Tennessee who pastored a white church in the 1850s. Blassingame wanted to "solve the myriad dilemmas posed by George Bentley", but he also wanted to answer the questions, challenges, and critiques raised by scholars since the publication of The Slave Community.

Blassingame explains that he incorporated the suggestions published in Revisiting Blassingame's The Slave Community "without long protestation or argument". The most significant changes made to the text involve further discussion of African cultural survivals, slave family life, slave culture, and acculturation. Blassingame added a chapter titled "The Americanization of the Slave and the Africanization of the South" where he draws parallels between the acculturation of African American slaves in the American South, African slaves in Latin America, and European slaves in North Africa and the Ottoman Empire. He compares the conversion of slaves in the southern states to Protestant Christianity, European slaves in North Africa to Islam, and African slaves in Latin America to Catholicism.

Blassingame addresses the historiography of slavery published between 1972 and 1978 in the revised edition. For instance, he challenges Robert Fogel and Stanley Engerman's economic and statistical study of slavery in Time on the Cross. Blassingame writes:

Contemporaries often have a greater appreciation of the strengths and weaknesses of statistics than do the scholars who utilize them decades after they are compiled. 'Numbers' and 'accuracy' are not two interchangeable words: Statistical truths are no more self-evident than literary ones. In fact, statistical analyses rely so heavily on inferences that one must carefully examine the data bases to evaluate the conclusions based on them. Whether compiled by planters, doctors, clergymen, army officers, or census takers, statistics on slavery mean little until combined with literary material. The dry bones of historical analysis, statistics acquire life when filtered through the accounts left by eyewitnesses.

Reviewing the revised edition in the Journal of Southern History, Gary B. Mills suggests, "All controversy and revision aside, The Slave Community remains a significant book, and the author's position that the bulk of both slaves and slaveowners lay between the stereotyped extremes proves durable. Their exact location on a scale of one to ten will always remain a matter of opinion."

== See also ==
- Uncle Tom's Cabin

== Notes ==
Unless noted, all citations from The Slave Community are from the 1979 revised edition
