= Indian-Pioneer Project =

1930s U.S. oral histories

Indian-Pioneer History Collection
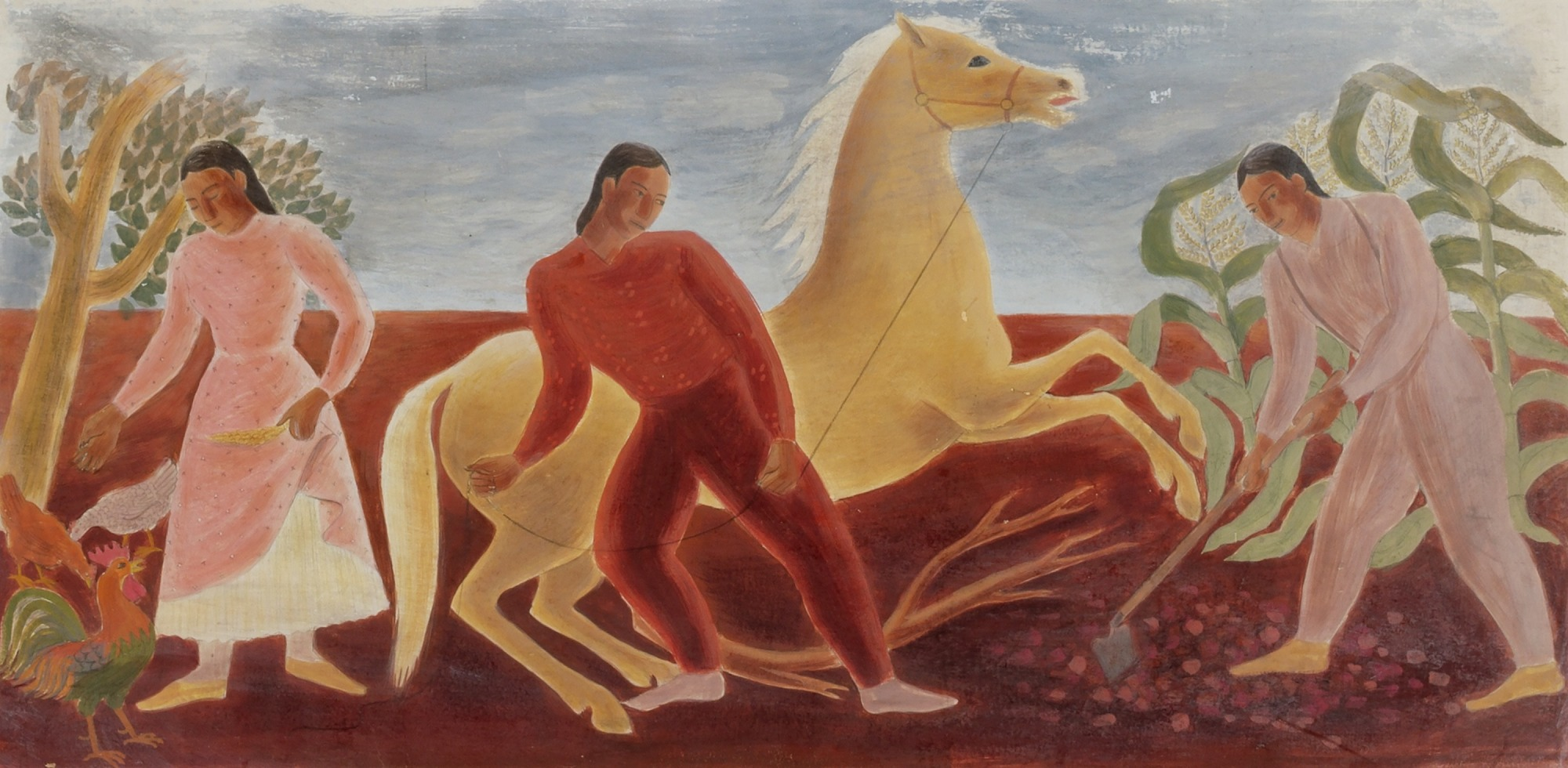
- Cherokee Indian Farming and Animal Husbandry (mural by Olga Mohr for the Stilwell, Oklahoma post office), produced for another New Deal project
- Years active: 1936 – 1938
- Project code: WPA Project S-149
- Sponsoring bodies: Oklahoma Historical Society; University of Oklahoma; Works Progress Administration (WPA)
- Project director: Grant Foreman (Historical Records Survey)
- Scope & volume: More than 11,000 interviews; 25,000 questionnaires; ~80,000 total entries; 112 to 116 bound volumes
- Subjects covered: Native American tribal elders, early white pioneers, and Black freedmen
- Main repositories: University of Oklahoma (Western History Collections); Oklahoma Historical Society

The Indian-Pioneer Project, or Indian and Pioneer Histories, was a New Deal-era Works Progress Administration (WPA) work-relief program in Oklahoma, United States. The Indian-Pioneer Project, a subprogram of the Federal Writers' Project (or possibly the Historical Records Survey), produced 8,000 oral histories of people who were present in Oklahoma and Indian Territory before 1900.

== Description ==
According to historian Amanda Cobb-Greethem, there 80,000 "entries" in the collection, the product of 25,000 questionnaires and more than 11,000 interviews. The project employed about 80 to 100 workers in 1937 and 1938. The Oklahoma branch of the Federal Writers' Project "elected to develop projects that would emphasize and further develop the state's identity as the home of pioneers." These people were assigned "to interview Oklahoma pioneers, including Native Americans and black citizens who had been enslaved before emancipation," such as the Cherokee Freedmen and Choctaw Freedmen. A 1937 report in an Anadarko newspaper stated that most of the field workers in the "western district" were otherwise-unemployed teachers or office workers; one had a BS degree. The field workers met weekly with a supervisor.

Historian Angie Debo worked on the project and discovered that Muscogee oral history traditions "were remarkably close—at least for one hundred years—to the documentary evidence her friend Grant Foreman had uncovered in his 1934 book Indian Removal: The Emigration of the Five Civilized Tribes of Indians."

The output of the project was over 100 volumes of over 500 pages each. Historian Grant Foreman led the compilation of the resulting accounts. There are two copies, one at the Oklahoma Historical Society, under the titles Indian-Pioneer History or Grant Foreman Papers, and one at the University of Oklahoma in Norman, under the title Indian-Pioneer Papers Collection. There is also access to the papers in the Muscogee (Creek) Nation National Library and Archives in Okmulgee, Oklahoma. The Oklahoma Historical Society microfilmed their copy, in 40 reels. The historical society set has 116 volumes, and the university set has 113 volumes, so "the pagination of each set is obviously different." There is a 50,000-card index to the Indian-Pioneer Project in three file cabinets in historical society's archives department. This index was produced by historical society archivist Rella Watts Looney, who "spent untold hours of her spare time over several years, before her retirement in 1974, compiling a comprehensive card index of the collection in Oklahoma City."

Many or most of the Oklahoma interviews with former slaves were "never forwarded" to Washington, D.C. A collection of 130 of these oral histories was compiled and published by the University of Oklahoma Press in 1996.

== See also ==
- WPA Slave Narrative Collection
- William Cunningham, Oklahoma FWP director
- Five Civilized Tribes

== Sources ==
- Cobb-Greetham, Amanda (2015). "7. Hearth and Home: Cherokee and Creek Women's Memories of the Civil War in Indian Territory". In Clampitt, Bradley R. (ed.). The Civil War and Reconstruction in Indian Territory. Women in the West. University of Nebraska Press. pp. 153–171. doi:10.2307/j.ctt1d98c51.11. ISBN 978-0-8032-7727-4. JSTOR j.ctt1d98c51.11. LCCN 2015002790. OCLC 926101868.
- Leckie, Shirley A. (2008). "Angie Debo: From the Old to the New Western History". In Leckie, Shirley Anne; Parezo, Nancy J. (eds.). Their Own Frontier: Women Intellectuals Re-Visioning the American West. Lincoln: University of Nebraska Press. pp. 65–96. ISBN 9780803222595. LCCN 2008001839. OCLC 232607277. OL 18356472W. Project MUSE book 11836.
