= George Rawick =

American historian

George Philip Rawick (December 8, 1929 – June 27, 1990) was a pioneering historian of slavery whose work transformed the field by centering the voices and experiences of slaves. He is best known for editing the monumental 41-volume The American Slave: A Composite Autobiography, which brought the testimonies of former slaves - recorded by the Federal Writers' Project in the 1930s - into the academic mainstream. In an era when historical narratives of slavery were still dominated by planter perspectives, Rawick's work broke new ground by arguing that oral histories from former slaves should be treated with the same seriousness as written records from slaveholders. His interpretive framework, deeply influenced by Marxism and the Black radical tradition, emphasized the agency, culture, and resistance of enslaved communities and helped lay the groundwork for later scholarship by historians such as Eugene Genovese, Herbert Gutman, and John Blassingame.

== Biography ==
Rawick was born in 1929 in Brooklyn, New York, and died in 1990 in St. Louis, Missouri. He grew up in a community of first and second generation Jewish Americans. He was educated in the New York City public schools and graduated with a bachelor's degree at Oberlin College. He subsequently earned a Ph.D. in history at the University of Wisconsin–Madison. He studied under Professor Merle Curti, who was one of the leading American historians of the era. Rawick completed his dissertation, The New Deal and Youth: The Civilian Conservation Corps, the National Youth Administration, and the American Youth Congress, in 1957: which contrasted the conservative, authoritarian, Army-run Civilian Conservation Corps with the leftist, democratically run National Youth Administration, which allowed him to discuss the often contradictory impulses underlying the New Deal generally.

Over his long career in academia, Rawick taught at Washington University in St. Louis, Wayne State University, State University of New York, the University of Chicago, and the University of Missouri-St. Louis, among others. Rawick held brief postings at Harvard University and Cornell University. Rawick claims his lack of academic writing in these positions was due to opposition at the upper levels of academia due to his Marxism.

In 1967, Rawick went on a speaking tour in Germany and Italy. His main talking points were on Black revolt and the capitalist restructuring of the 1930s. He spoke in many cities, including Berlin, Milan, Frankfurt, and Florence. Rawick spoke to thousands of students in universities at every city he visited.

His papers are held at the Western Historical Manuscripts Collection at the University of Missouri-St. Louis.

== Political affiliations ==
Rawick became politically active in his teens, joining the Communist American Youth for Democracy around 1944–45, at a time when his Jewish family had stopped receiving letters from relatives in Nazi-occupied Europe. While at Oberlin College, he joined the Lorain, Ohio branch of the Communist Party USA, where the large Black working class strongly influenced his political views and drew him toward civil rights activism. Disillusioned with Oberlin's treatment of the local Black community, he grew increasingly radical, working on Henry A. Wallace’s 1948 Communist backed Progressive Party campaign and briefly for Communist backed Congressman Vito Marcantonio. He was expelled from the Communist Party under controversial circumstances, with future slavery historian Robert Fogel involved in the decision.

In the early 1950s, Rawick joined the Trotskyite Independent Socialist League, where he eventually becoming editor of the magazine Anvil. He later became involved with the Detroit-based Facing Reality group, led by C. L. R. James, whose emphasis on Black radicalism and labor struggle deeply shaped Rawick’s thinking. During trips to London, he met African, African American, and Caribbean intellectuals such as George Lamming, Aimé Césaire, and Kwame Ture, prompting him to take slavery more seriously as a scholarly subject. He also wrote for the journal Radical America, which published his influential essay, "Working Class Self-Activity," in 1969.

== Published works ==
=== The American Slave: A Composite Autobiography ===
The most enduring achievement of his career was his editorship of the 41-volume set of oral histories of former slaves, titled The American Slave: A Composite Autobiography. This collection began publication in 1972. The interviews which this set contains, the Slave Narrative Collection, were taken under the auspices of the Works Projects Administration (WPA), a New Deal program. Rawick's methodology of taking testimony from former slaves seriously and using it in his writing revolutionized the study of slavery in the 1970s. He thought that their testimony was as serious as documentary that was left by slaveholders, which was unheard of at the time. They remained in typescript until Rawick took on the task of supervising their preparation for publication.

From 1963 to 1968, Rawick traveled frequently to London to work with C. L. R. James. On a visit in 1964, James asked Rawick to give a lecture on American history to guests at his home. After Rawick finished, James asked him if he knew anything about the slaves' own reactions to being enslaved. Rawick quickly realized he did not know much about how the slaves' felt, but recalled that there was a collection of interviews done by ex-slaves in the late 1930s. This interaction led to Rawick's monumental work, The American Slave: A Composite Autobiography. Rawick made all of the interviews done by ex-slaves available to students and scholars.

=== From Sundown to Sunup: The Making of the Black Community ===
Volume One of the series consists of Rawick's contribution to the historical literature of American slavery, an important book titled From Sundown to Sunup: The Making of the Black Community. This book has been translated into 12 languages, and was one of the first books to take American slaves seriously as actors in their own history.

=== Listening to Revolt: the selected writings of George Rawick ===
Listening to Revolt is a collection of twelve of the most influential writings by George Rawick, along with an introduction by David Roediger, and afterwords by Enoch H. Page, Ferruccio Gambino, and George Lipsitz. The work shows Rawick's major contributions to African American history and Marxist social theory. Rawick was able to tie the civil rights movement together with the tradition of class struggle.

David Roediger analyzed primary sources from the George P. Rawick Papers found at the University of Missouri to craft his introduction. Roediger describes the development of Rawick's ideology in radical labor and the Black freedom movement in Detroit and London. Enoch H. Page uses his experience in studying and working with Rawick to contextualize Rawick's capabilities as an oral historian and dialectician. Rawick used his skills to be able to forge relationships with radical African American students and scholars in St. Louis. Ferruccio Gambino writes about Rawick's speaking tour in Italy in 1967. Rawick lectured at universities in front of crowds of radical students and workers. Rawick spoke to them about the civil rights campaign in the United States, and the struggles of workers in Detroit's automobile factories. George Lipsitz was a teaching assistant for Rawick during the 1970s. Lipsitz writes about Rawick's impact as a scholar and activist in the working class struggle, African American resistance, and stopping the spread of white supremacy.

Listening to Revolt was released in 2010, 20 years after the death of George Rawick.

== Sources ==
- Lichtenstein, Alex (1996). James, C. L. R. (ed.). "George Rawick's "From Sundown to Sunup" and the Dialectic of Marxian Slave Studies". Reviews in American History. 24 (4): 712–725. doi:10.1353/rah.1996.0097. ISSN 0048-7511. JSTOR 30030732. S2CID 143743569.
- Roediger, David R. (2010-04-01). "A White Intellectual among Thinking Black Intellectuals: George Rawick and the Settings of Genius". South Atlantic Quarterly. 109 (2): 225–247. doi:10.1215/00382876-2009-033. ISSN 0038-2876.
- Rawick, George P., ed. (1972). The American Slave: A Composite Autobiography. Oral histories with ex-slaves conducted in the 1930s by Works Progress Administration.
