= America Eats =

Branch of the Federal Writers' Project

America Eats was a project under the Federal Writers' Project (FWP) during the 1930s in the United States. The FWP was one of the many projects contained within the Works Progress Administration, which was a New Deal program created during the Great Depression.

America Eats was created in the late 1930s with the intention of producing a book regarding regional foodways. The project was divided into five regions: the Northeast, the South, the Middle West, the Far West and the Southwest. Each region had a team of writers producing short essays discussing the foods and collecting interviews particular to a state. The America Eats project was the brainchild of the FWP's main editor, Katherine Kellock. Her goal was to highlight the "ethnic traditions, as well as the regional and local customs" of foodways in the United States. As a result of Pearl Harbor and the United States' entry into World War II, funding for the project was pulled and funneled into the war effort. Subsequently, the materials for the America Eats project have remained in relative obscurity, scattered around the country in archives and libraries. The majority of the remaining America Eats materials can be found in the Library of Congress and the Montana State University Archives and Special Collections.

== Background and history ==
The Federal Writers' Project was created in 1935 as part of the Works Progress Administration as a source of employment for teachers, writers, historians, and other white-collar workers. By the 1940s, administrators of the FWP were actively looking for new projects after the completion of the popular American Guide Series. Katherine Kellock presented the idea of a similar type of publication as the Guide Series but focusing on regional foodways. By creating a series of essays—each focusing on a different region of the United States—the editors of the project wanted to demonstrate how regional tastes and foods contributed to a distinct and unique American cuisine. The America Eats project was set up with federal editors and a central federal office in Washington, D.C., with a series of state-based writers operating the individual State Writers' Projects. For each region, one State Project would be designated as the head office for that region. The head offices were assigned as follows.

- The Northeast: the New Jersey Writers' Project
- The South: the Louisiana Writers' Project
- The Middle West: the Illinois Writers' Project
- The Far West: the Montana Writers' Project
- The Southwest: the Arizona Writers' Project

Each of these head offices was in charge of receiving field notes, correspondence, and essay drafts for the states in their region. The America Eats project was never intended to be a cookbook, but rather a series of essays demonstrating the unique foods and cultures in the five regions of the United States. By winter 1941 and spring 1942, most states had submitted materials to the project's headquarters in Washington, D.C., where the intention was to compile the regional essays, interviews, notes, and photographs into a cohesive book format. However, with the entry of the United States into World War II the America Eats! book was never completed and published, and the materials gathered from across the country were sent to various locations for storage. The majority of America Eats materials are housed at the Library of Congress, but several archives around the country also have retained collections of materials related to the project. This includes physical collections at the Kentucky Department for Libraries and Archives, Michigan State University Libraries Special Collections, Montana State University Library, New York State Archives, State Historical Society of North Dakota, and University of Michigan Archive.

== Contemporary ==
The largest digital compilation of materials from all five regions of the America Eats project are held by What America Ate, a site created and run by the Department of History at Michigan State University. The site has a variety of additional digitized culinary ephemera, including advertisements and community cookbooks. The majority of America Eats materials have been digitized and placed on What America Ate, searchable through an interactive map, by region, or by format. To date, this remains the largest digital collection of America Eats materials.

== See also ==
- American cuisine
- Franklin D. Roosevelt
