= Albert J. Raboteau =

American academic (1943–2021)

- Born: Albert Jordy Raboteau II; September 4, 1943; Bay St. Louis, Mississippi, U.S.
- Died: September 18, 2021 (aged 78); Princeton, New Jersey, U.S.
- Spouses: Katherine (div.); Julia Raboteau (div.); Joanne Shima
- Children: 4

Academic background
- Education: Loyola University of Los Angeles (BA); University of California, Berkeley (MA); Yale University (PhD)
- Thesis: The Invisible Institution (1974)
- Influences: Sydney Ahlstrom; John W. Blassingame

Academic work
- Discipline: History; religious studies
- Institutions: Princeton University
- Notable works: Slave Religion (1978)

Dean of Princeton University Graduate School
- In office 1992–1993
- Preceded by: Theodore Ziolkowski
- Succeeded by: David N. Redman (acting)

Albert Jordy Raboteau II (September 4, 1943 – September 18, 2021) was an American scholar of African and African-American religions. Since 1982, he had been affiliated with Princeton University, where he was Henry W. Putnam Professor of Religion.

== Biography ==
=== Early life and education ===
Raboteau was born into a Catholic family in Bay St. Louis, Mississippi, three months after his father, Albert Jordy Raboteau Sr. (1899–1943), was killed there by a white man. The killer claimed self-defense and was never prosecuted. Raboteau was named for his late father, who was of African and French Creole descent.

His widowed mother moved the family from Mississippi, where she was a teacher, to find a better place in the North for her children to grow up. She married again, to Royal Woods, an African-American minister. They lived in Ann Arbor, Michigan, for a period and in California. Raboteau's stepfather taught the boy Latin and Greek starting at the age of five years, and helped him to focus on church and education as he grew up. Raboteau attended Catholic parochial schools.

When he was 11 years old he traveled with other choir boys from St. Thomas Catholic Church of Ann Arbor to sing in an international choir festival at the Vatican.

Raboteau was accepted into college at the age of 16. He earned his Bachelor of Arts degree at Loyola University in Los Angeles, California in 1964 and a Master of Arts degree in English from the University of California, Berkeley. Around this time, Raboteau married and started a family.

Raboteau entered the Yale Graduate Program in Religious Studies, where he studied with American religious historian Sydney Ahlstrom and African-American historian John Blassingame, receiving his Doctor of Philosophy degree in 1974.

==== The Invisible Institution ====
Raboteau's dissertation, later revised and published as the book Slave Religion: The "Invisible Institution" in the Antebellum South, was published just as the black studies movement was gaining steam in the 1970s. It was seen in the line of revolutionary scholarship around American slavery incorporating slave narratives into mainstream history which also included Blassingame's Slave Community (1972) and Slave Testimony (1977); Eugene Genovese's Roll, Jordan, Roll (1974), Olli Alho's The Religion of Slaves (1976), and Lawrence Levine's Black Culture and Black Consciousness (1977).

=== Career ===
Princeton University hired Raboteau in 1982, eventually appointing him Henry W. Putnam Professor of Religion in 1992. His research and teaching focus on American Catholic history, African-American religions, and religion and immigration issues. He chaired the Department of Religion (1987–92) and also served as dean of the Graduate School (1992–93). During his professorship, he trained as graduate students Michael Eric Dyson, Eddie Glaude, and Judith Weisenfeld. The Christian Century called Raboteau the "godfather of Afro-religious studies".

Raboteau received Princeton's MLK Day Lifetime Service Award (Journey Award) in both 2005 and 2006. Raboteau retired in 2013, but he continued to teach as a professor emeritus. He then studied "the place of beauty in the history of Eastern and Western Christian Spirituality."

=== Later life ===
In January 2021, Raboteau entered hospice care. He died on September 18, 2021, in Princeton, New Jersey, aged 78, due to Lewy body dementia.

== Personal life ==
In the late 20th century, Raboteau converted to Eastern Orthodoxy at a time of personal crisis and divorce from his first wife. At the time of his conversion, he took the name Panteleimon, a term for God meaning the "all merciful". As of 2002, he served as lay coordinator of Mother of God Joy of All Who Sorrow Orthodox Mission in Rocky Hill, New Jersey.

He was married three times and had four children: Albert III, Charles, Martin, and Emily.

== Honors ==
- He was the first recipient of the J.W.C. Pennington Award from the University of Heidelberg.
- In 2013 The Journal of Africana Religions established the annual Albert J. Raboteau Book Prize, awarded by a five-member committee to a book that" exemplifies the ethos and mission" of the journal. It is an international prize awarded to books by academic publishers.
- In 2015 he gave the Stone Lectures at Princeton Theological Seminary.

== Books ==
- Raboteau, Albert J. (2004) [1978]. Slave religion: the "invisible institution" in the antebellum South (Updated ed.). Oxford; New York: Oxford University Press. ISBN 978-0-19-517413-7.
- A Fire in the Bones: Reflections on African-American Religious History, Boston: Beacon Press, 1995. ISBN 0-8070-0932-6.
- African American Religion: Interpretive Essays in History and Culture, New York: Routledge, 1997. ISBN 0-415-91458-2. Co-edited with Timothy E. Fulop.
- Canaan Land: A Religious History of African Americans. New York: Oxford University Press, 1999. ISBN 0-19-514585-2.
- A Sorrowful Joy: A Spiritual Journey of an African-American Man in Late Twentieth-Century America, New York: Paulist Press, 2002. ISBN 0-8091-4093-4.
- Immigration and Religion in America: Comparative and Historical Perspectives, co-edited with Richard Alba and Josh DeWind; New York: New York University Press, 2008 ISBN 9780814705049
- American Prophets: Seven Religious Radicals and Their Struggle for Social and Political Justice, Princeton University Press: 2016 ISBN 978-0691164304

== See also ==
- George Alexander McGuire
- Raphael Morgan
