= William Meredith Cunningham =

American writer

William Meredith Cunningham (13 May 1901- 20 February 1967) was an acclaimed Oklahoman writer of the 1930s. He is known for his involvement in the Works Progress Administration's Federal Writer's Project, and was a supporter of the American Socialist Party.

== Biography ==
Bill Cunningham was born on May 13, 1901, in Okeene, Oklahoma and was the brother of Agnes "Sis" Cunningham. He graduated from the University of Oklahoma in 1925 with a degree in Journalism. Shortly after his graduation, he married Clarice Ellsworth. His first jobs included working as the editor of the Watonga Herald, a local weekly newspaper, and also as a high school teacher. Cunningham taught at Commonwealth College (a leftist and pro-labor school) in Mena, Arkansas in the 1930s. He filed for divorce from Clarice Ellsworth in 1934, and later married Sara Brown.

In 1935, Cunningham published his two books: The Green Corn Rebellion, a fictionalized account of Oklahoma farmers protesting the United States' involvement in World War I; and Pretty Boy, a novel recounting the legend of bank robber Charles "Pretty Boy" Floyd. The former is recognized as his signature work. Notably, Cunningham was involved in the Works Progress Administration (WPA), serving as the state director of Oklahoma's Federal Writer's Project from 1935 to 1938. In 1938, he moved to Washington D.C. to serve as the assistant to the national director of the Federal Writer's Project. While working for the WPA, Cunningham contributed to the W.P.A Guide to Oklahoma, Born in Slavery: Slave Narratives from the Federal Writers' Project 1936-1938, and a Comanche dictionary. Cunningham then moved to New York in 1940, where he worked for The Russian News Agency (TASS) until 1948, and published two more books: The Real Book About Daniel Boone (1952), and Danny (1953), which he co-authored with his second wife, Sara Brown Cunningham.

Cunningham died on February 20th, 1967, at the age of 66.

== Published works ==
- The Green Corn Rebellion. New York: Vanguard Press, 1935
- Pretty Boy. New York: Vanguard, 1936
- The Real Book about Daniel Boone. Garden City, N.Y.: Garden City Books, by arrangement with F. Watts, 1952
- Danny. With Sara Brown Cunningham. New York: Crown, 1953
