= WPA Slave Narrative Collection =

New Deal oral history recording project

Slave Narratives: A Folk History of Slavery in the United States
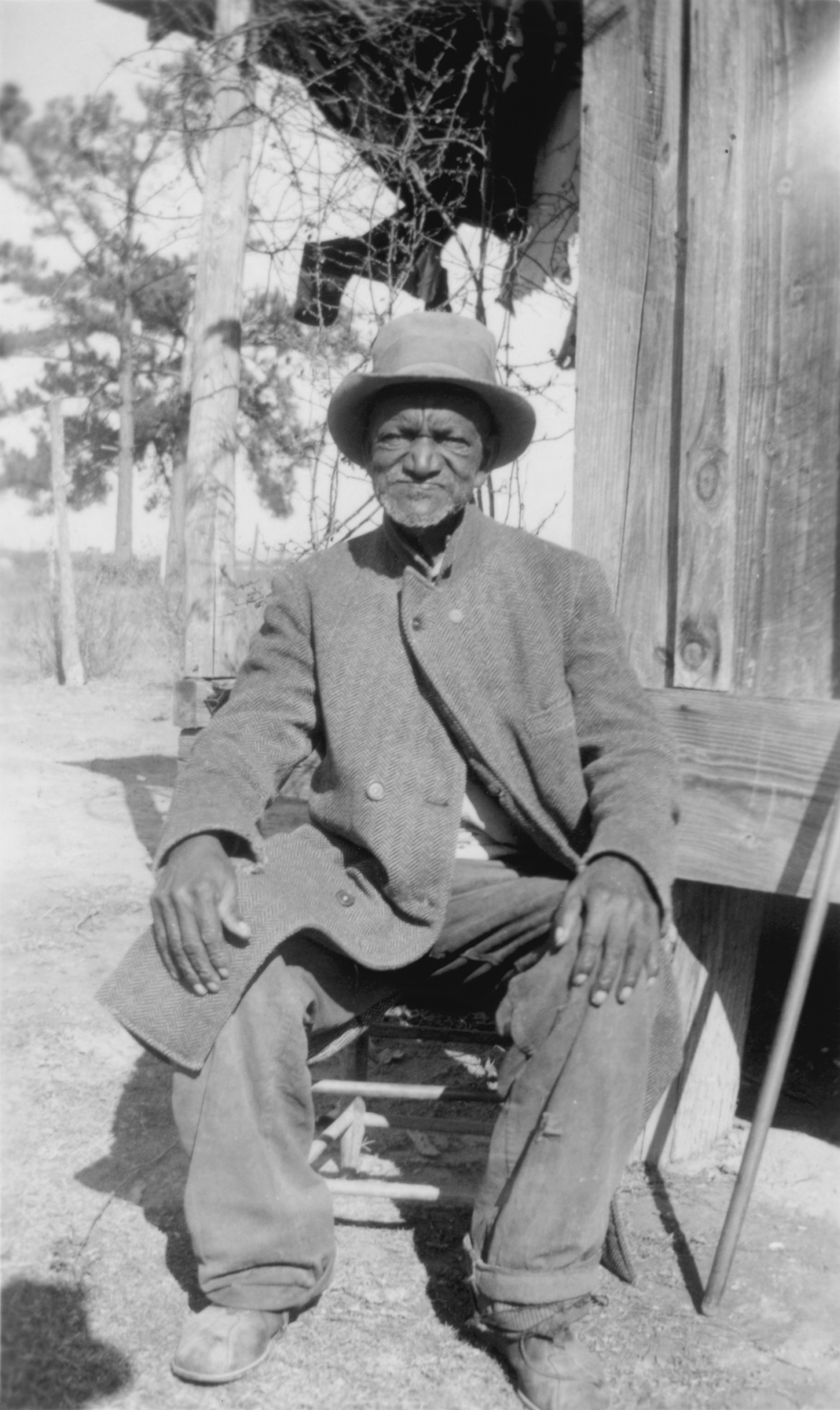
- Former slave Wes Brady in Marshall, Texas, in 1937 in a photo from the Slave Narrative Collection
- Years compiled: 1936 – 1938 (Assembled in 1941)
- Created by: Federal Writers' Project (FWP) of the Works Progress Administration (WPA)
- Key directors: John Lomax (Folklore Advisor); Benjamin A. Botkin
- Scope / Size: Approx. 2,300 first-person accounts; Over 500 photographs; 17-volume final set; 17 states represented
- Scope leader: Arkansas (contributed nearly 700 interviews)
- Repository: Library of Congress (Manuscript Division)
- Legal status: Public domain (U.S. government work)

Slave Narratives: A Folk History of Slavery in the United States (often referred to as the WPA Slave Narrative Collection) is a collection of histories by formerly enslaved people undertaken by the Federal Writers' Project of the Works Progress Administration from 1936 to 1939. It was the simultaneous effort of state-level branches of FWP in seventeen states, working largely separately from each other. FWP administrators sought to develop a new appreciation for the elements of American life from different backgrounds, including that from the last generation of formerly enslaved individuals. The collections of life histories and materials on African American life that resulted gave impetus to the collection.

The collection of narratives and photographs are works of the U.S. federal government and, as such, are in the public domain. They have been digitized and are available online. Excerpts also have been published by various publishers as printed books or on the Internet. The total collection contains more than 10,000 typed pages, representing more than 2,000 interviews. The Library of Congress in Washington, D.C. also has a digitized collection of audio recordings that were sometimes made during these interviews.

== Origins and inspiration ==
After 1916, The Journal of Negro History published articles that in part had to do with the African American experience of slavery (as opposed to the white view of it). This resulted in several efforts to record the remembrances of living former enslaved individuals, especially as the survivors of the generation born into slavery before Emancipation in 1865 were declining in number.

The earliest of these were two projects began in 1929, one led by Charles S. Johnson at Fisk University and a second by John B. Cade at Southern University, called "Opinions Regarding Slavery - Slave Narratives." In 1934 Lawrence D. Reddick, one of Johnson's students, proposed a federally-funded project to collect narratives from formerly enslaved individuals through the Federal Emergency Relief Administration, which was providing work opportunities for unemployed people as part of the first wave of New Deal funding. This program, however, did not achieve its ambitious goals. Several years passed before narratives began to be collected again.

Although some members of the Federal Writers' Project were aware of Reddick's project, the FWP slave narrative collection was more directly inspired by the collections of folklore undertaken by John Lomax. The FWP at the time was creating a series of folk anthologies to capture American life and appointed Lomax to direct activities of such a project, Lomax pioneered the interview method and placed emphasis on collecting Life-history as corollary material. Carita Doggett Corse was appointed head of the FWP branch in Florida in 1935 and, having recalled interviewing an ex-slave years earlier while working on a history of Fort George Island, suggested using the two interview former slaves and would send members of the Florida FWP's black writers' unit, including Zora Neale Hurston, to interview former slaves. A parallel but unrelated project was carried out by Carolyn Dillard, director of the Georgia branch of the Writers' Project, pursuing the goal of collecting stories from persons in the state who had been born into slavery with specifically black members of the FWP being sent to conduct interview.

In March 1937 several of the Florida slave interviews were forwarded to Washington, the interviews intrigued Lomax who saw the preservation value in them, and he would propose that a similar effort be conducted in the rest of the southern states. The collection of slave narratives formally began on April 1, 1937, when instructions directing southern FWP branches to begin interviewing former slaves. In 1938 Benjamin A. Botkin would take over from Lomax.

== Project ==
The Slave Narrative was conducted over all of the Southern States and several Northern States. Arkansas ultimately collected the largest volume of slave narratives of any state with nearly 700 interviews compiled over 7 volumes. The exact number of narratives collected is unclear, with most sources saying over 2,000. Varying estimates range from "nearly 2,000" to "over 2,400", the Library of Congress which houses the collection says there are "approximately 2,300". Lomax stated "It should be remembered that the Federal Writers' Project is not interested in taking sides on any question. The worker should not censor any materials collected regardless of its nature." Narratives were never questioned or rejected over accuracy concerns.

As the FWP was decentralized and Lomax ultimately did not have administrative control over all branches, the formatting and interview process of the slave narrative project varied from state to state. Whether or not the Interviewer's name is included with the interview, the questions that are asked, inclusion of physical and home descriptions of the former slaves being interviewed, and if the text is a direct transcription or an abridged version vary by state and interviewer.

Most interviews done were rendered in a phonetically written out dialect. While the project was focused on former black slaves, a small number of people interviewed were not, those including the children of slaves born after emancipation, children of slave-owners, and at least two individuals who claim to have been non-black slaves.

Despite Dillard and Corse recommending using black interviewers to obtain more accurate information, no action was taken to ensure this continued in other states and thus the majority of interviewers were white which may have affected the information given.

The majority of interviews were recorded from 1937 to early 1938, after early 1938 most FWP branches moved back to prioritizing state guides. By 1939 most state FWP branches ended the project, except for Louisiana where it was continued until 1941. The Interviews remained in state archives until the termination of the FWP in 1943 when most of the interviews would be sent to the Library of Congress. Many interviews were never given over to the Library of Congress and remain in state archives unpublished to this day, one source estimates this number is around 1000.

== Controversy surrounding the interviews ==
Though the collection preserved hundreds of life stories that would otherwise have been lost, later historians have agreed that, compiled as it was by primarily white interviewers, the collection does not represent an entirely unbiased view. Because the federal government employed mostly white interviewers to document these former enslaved individuals' stories, there is a debate regarding whether these interviews are tainted by racism. John Blassingame, an influential historian of slavery, has said that the collection can present "a simplistic and distorted view of the plantation" that is too positive. Blassingame's argument proved controversial; one historian in the 1990s described support for Blassingame's position as "rare," but defended him on the grounds that "all historical evidence has to be measured against a minimum standard of truth that would allow historians to use it properly. Historians have not, to date, applied this stipulation to the slave narratives". Other historians worried that individuals interviewed may have modified their accounts in other ways because of being interviewed by whites.

Historian Catherine Stewart argues in her book Long Past Slavery: Representing Race in the Federal Writer's Project, that "a way for Anderson, a former slave being who was interviewed by a white man, to comment on race relations in Jim Crow Florida- a means for a black interviewee to make an argument about the unwelcome presence of a white interviewer in her home, and to point out the danger she perceived in his presence, all while preserving a mask of civility and giving the interviewer what he had asked for? While Federal Writer's Project interviewers like Frost were engaged in writing down African American ghost stories", Stewart writes, "former slaves such as Josephine Anderson were conjuring up tales about power and racial identities". Historian Lauren Tilton asserts that "the Ex-Slave Narratives became a site to negotiate black people's right to full citizenship and to be a part of the nation's identity. The subjectivity of the interviewer, the questions posed, responses from the interviewees, and the ways the stories were written shaped the narratives, which became a contested space to assert or de-legitimize black selfhood and therefore rights to full incorporation into the nation."

== Project impact ==
More recently, even as the narratives have become more widely available through digital means, historians have used them for more narrow, specific kinds of studies. For instance, one historian has examined responses to conflict among the members of the Gullah community of the Low Country, with a view to relating it to traditional African ideas about restorative justice. Another has drawn from them for a history of representations of the black body extending to the present. Another historian has studied them as a window into the time period of their transmission, the 1930s and the Great Depression, rather than the antebellum period they document. Though most of the narratives are preserved only in the notes of the interviewers, large numbers of photographs and 78 rpm audio recordings were made as well. These have proved valuable for such purposes as examining changes in African-American Vernacular English over time.

Clint Smith writes that these narratives have also impacted the Black Lives Matter movement, which "has further pushed historians to revisit these stories. The past several years—and particularly the months since last summer’s racial-justice protests—have prompted many people to question what we’ve been taught, to see our shared past with new eyes. The FWP narratives afford us the opportunity to understand how slavery shaped this country through the stories of those who survived it".

== Publication ==
A small group of the narratives first appeared in print in a Writers' Project book, These Are Our Lives. Excerpts from them were included in a Virginia Writers' Project book in 1940, and Benjamin Botkin's Lay My Burden Down in 1945.

In 1972, following the civil rights movement when changing culture created more widespread interest in early African American history, George Rawick started publishing these interviews as The American Slave: A Composite Autobiography, eventually as 41 volumes. Rawick's methodology of taking testimony from former slaves seriously and using it in his writing revolutionized the study of slavery in the 1970s. The influence of New Social History, as well as increased attention to the historical agency of enslaved individuals, led to new interpretations and analysis of slave life.

An anthology was published in 1998 that included audio cassettes with excerpts from the collections' recordings. The narratives also served as the basis for the 2003 HBO documentary Unchained Memories: Readings from the Slave Narratives.

== Legacy ==
As presented on the Henry Louis Gates Jr. series African-American Lives, the actor Morgan Freeman's great-grandmother Cindy Anderson was one of the people interviewed for the Slaves Narrative Project.

Finding Your Roots, another series presented by Gates, would present an interview Jane Arrington conducted by the project to her great-great-great nephew Pharrell Williams.

Author Colson Whitehead would use interviews from the project as research for his novel The Underground Railroad.

== Photograph gallery ==
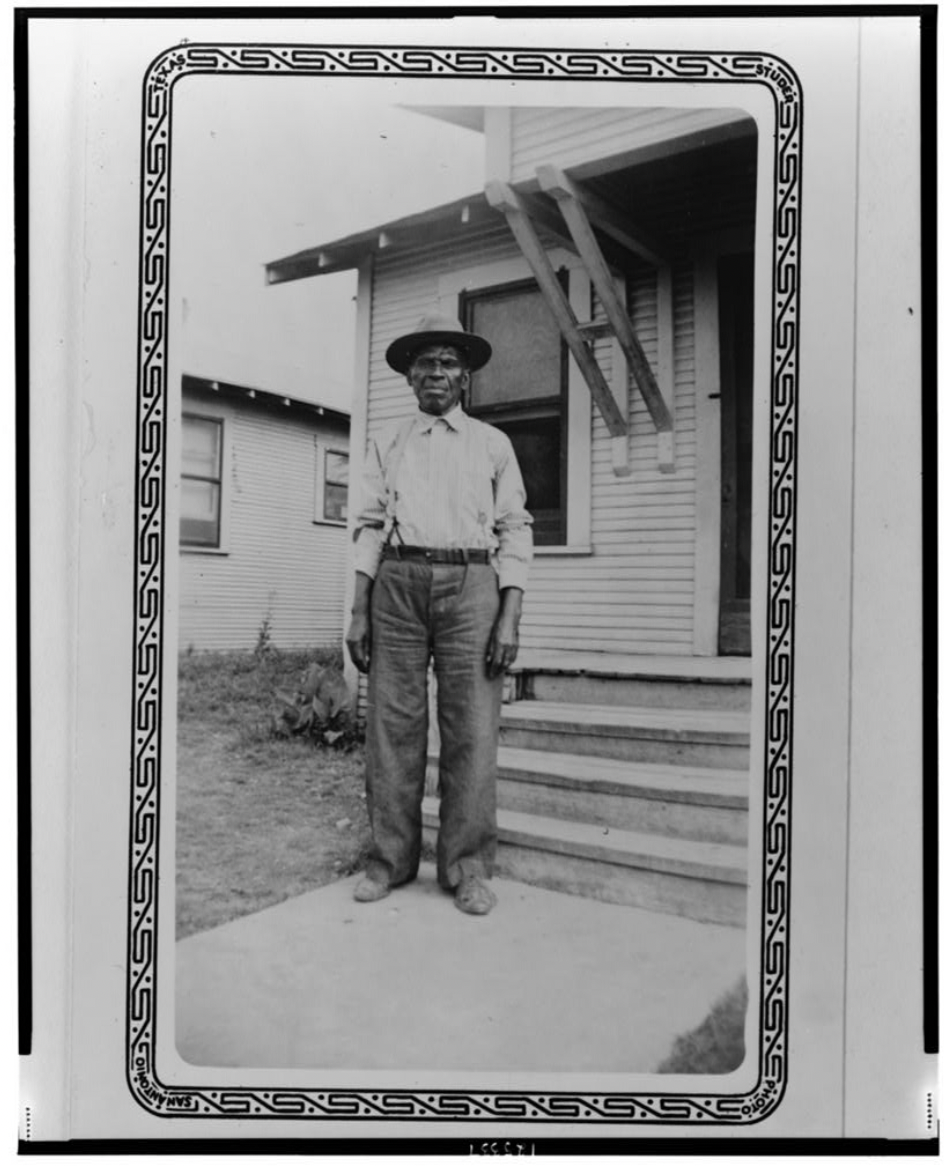
Photograph of William Watkins, ex-slave, from the Slave Narratives from the Federal Writers' Project, 1936–1938, Library of Congress, Washington, D.C.

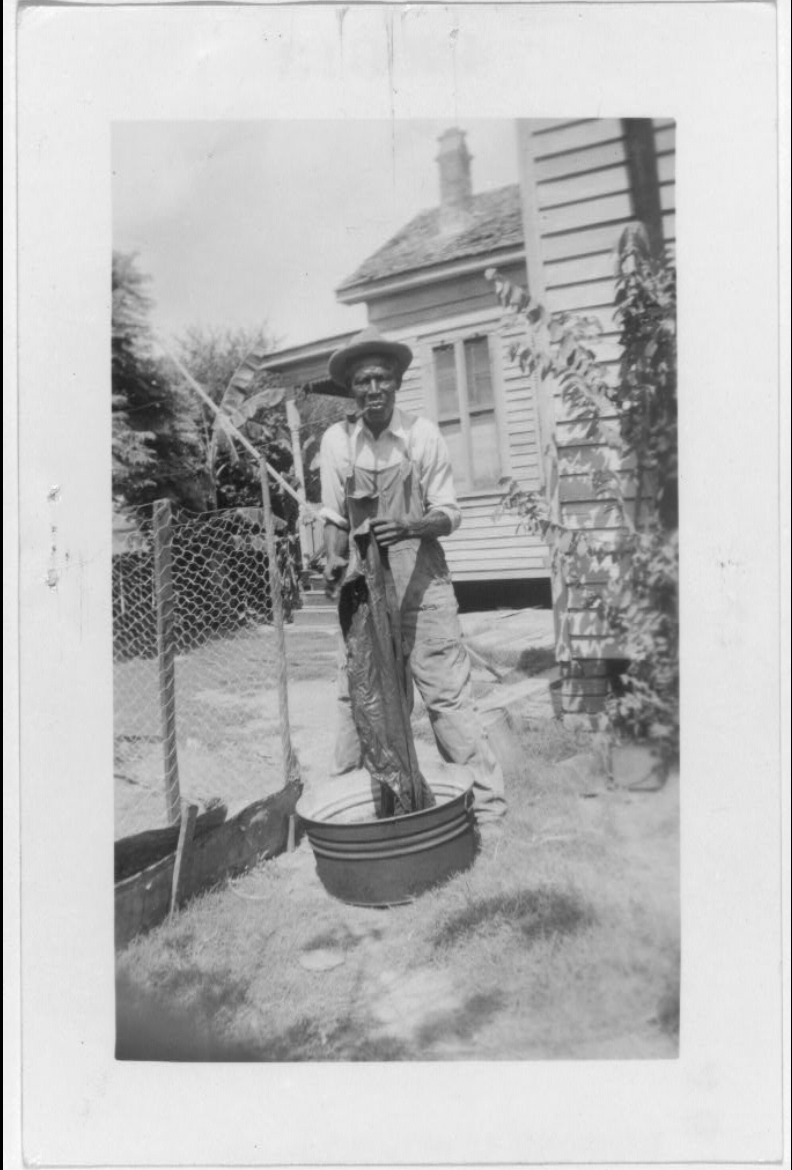
Photograph of Uncle Van Moore, ex-slave from the Slave Narratives from the Federal Writer's Project, 1936–1938, Library of Congress, Washington, D.C.

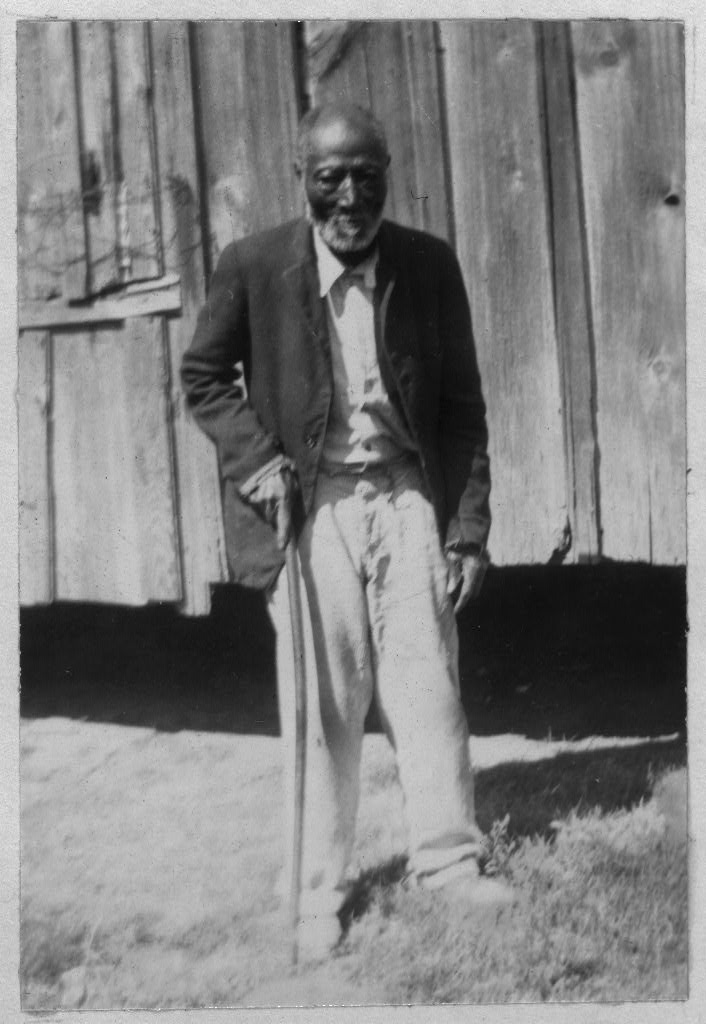
Photograph of George Dillard, age 85, former slave, from the Slave Narratives from the Federal Writers' Project, 1936–1938, Library of Congress, Washington, D.C.

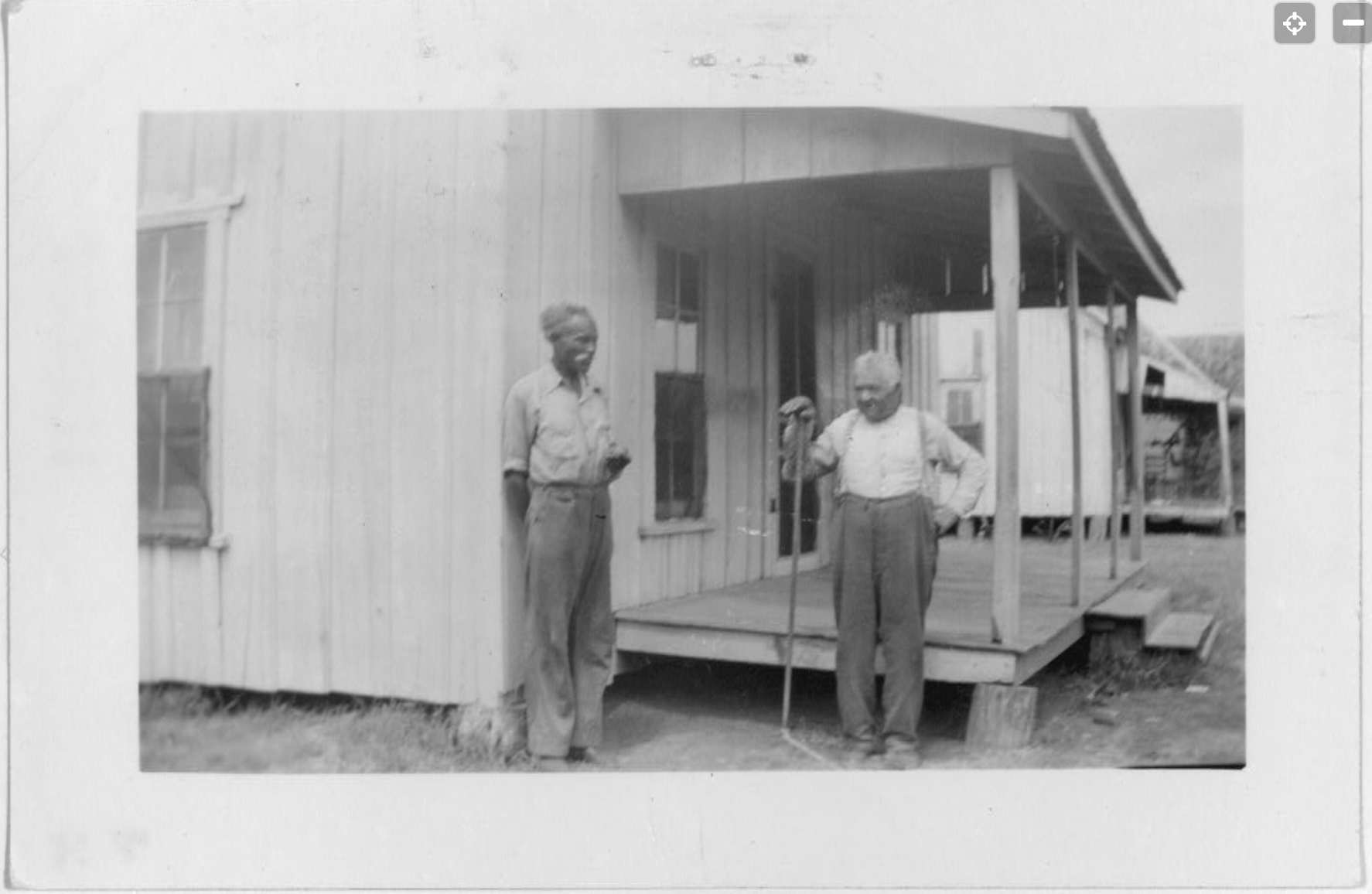
Photograph of Wayman William, ex-slave, from the Slave Narratives from the Federal Writer's Project, 1936–1938, Library of Congress, Washington, D.C.

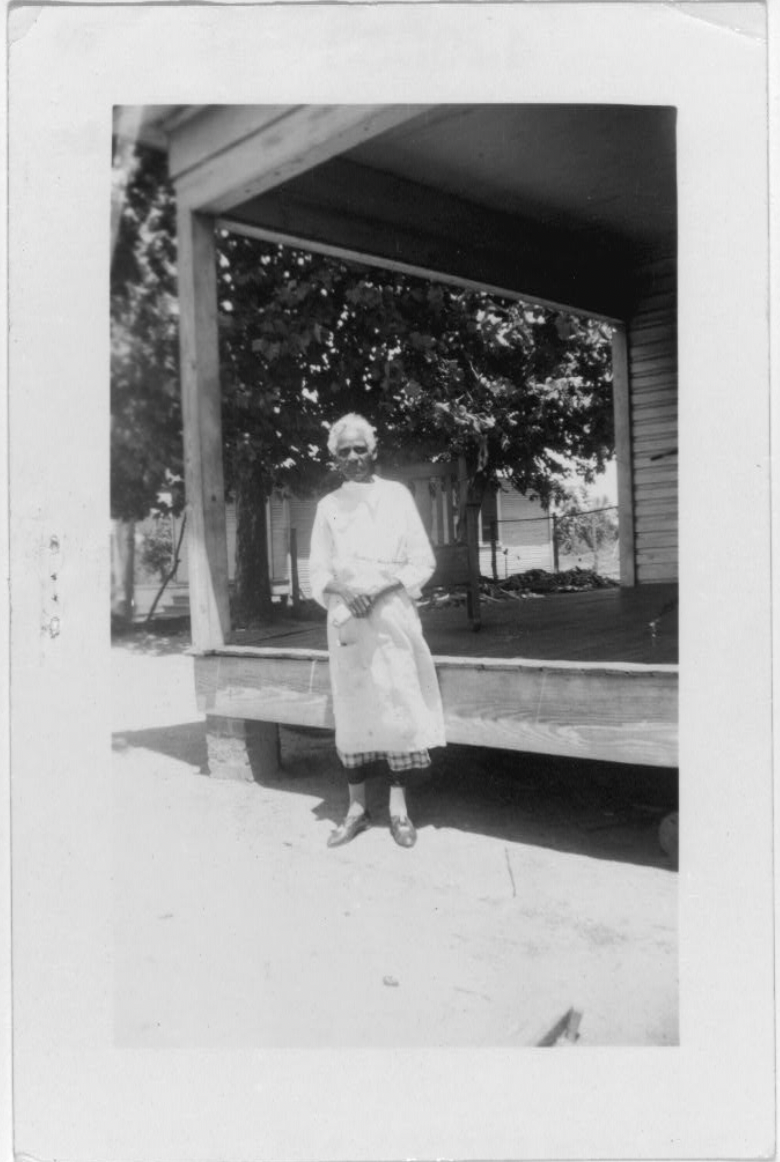
Photograph of Susan Merritt, ex-slave, from the Slave Narratives from the Federal Writers' Project, 1936–1938, Library of Congress, Washington, D.C.

== See also ==
- Slave narrative
- Indian-Pioneer Project
- William Andrew Johnson, Former-Slave of President Andrew Johnson who gave numerous interviews.
- Barracoon: The Story of the Last "Black Cargo", Earlier slave interview taken by Hurston.
