= Olga Mohr =

American artist (1905–1955)

- Born: Elizabeth Olga Mohr; July 20, 1905; Little Rock, Arkansas
- Died: April 10, 1955 (aged 49); Tuscaloosa, Alabama
- Other names: Olga E. Zoellner, Olga Elizabeth Mohr, Olga Mohr Zoellner
- Occupation: artist
- Years active: 1931–1953

Olga Mohr (July 20, 1905–April 10, 1955) was an American artist who worked in various mediums including painting, ceramics and weaving. She was one of the WPA's Section of Fine Arts artists and created the post office mural for Stilwell, Oklahoma. She was also in charge of the Federal Art Project for the Cincinnati public schools and was the only female member of the New Group of Cincinnati Artists, who studied and exhibited modern art in Ohio during the decade preceding World War II.

== Early life ==
Elizabeth Olga Mohr was born on July 20, 1905, in Little Rock, Arkansas to Ellen (or possibly Elizabeth née Spencer) and Ernest Louis Mohr. She grew up in the Oklahoma City area, where her father was a draper at a furniture store. She attended the Art Academy of Cincinnati, where she began competing in federal art projects in the early 1930s. In 1931, she won second prize in the National Association of Amusement Parks competition. She and fellow student Richard C. Zoellner completed their studies and in 1932, held an exhibition at the Cincinnati Art Museum of industrial designs with their former teacher, William Hentschel, of Rookwood Pottery fame. The exhibit earned praise and was so successful that its initial run was extended for several months. Mohr and Zoellner's works were praised as being individually distinct and rich in contrast, pattern and technique.

== Career ==
By 1933, Mohr, who retained her maiden name, and Zoellner had married and soon joined the United States Treasury's Section of Fine Arts, as well as continuing their exhibits around Cincinnati. In February 1935, Mohr participated in an exhibit of paintings at the Wurlitzer Gallery and then in November of the same year was praised for her work in a showing at the Cincinnati Art Museum. Her impressionistic works "Ballet Petruscha" and "Les Sylphides" earned accolades in the press. In 1936, she won honorable mention in a showing at the Denver Art Museum and exhibited works along with several artists at a memorial show for the creator of the Middletown Art Study Club, Mrs. R. W. Solomon. By 1937, Mohr was in charge of the Federal Art Project for the Cincinnati public schools and painted the mural for the Linwood School.

Mohr was the only woman in the group known as the New Group of Cincinnati Artists, which included Myer Abel, Paul G. Craft, Edward Firn, William Gebhardt, Harry Gothard, Mohr, Leo Murphy, Mathias Noheimer, and Zoellner. In 1937, the group was invited to do shows at the Art Association of Richmond, Indiana, and at the University of Chattanooga. Later that year, the couple were in Charlotte Amalie, U.S. Virgin Islands, where Richard had been commissioned by the government to paint and Mohr was sent to make studies of typical island scenes by the WPA. Three of Mohr's entries at the Getz-Brown Gallery's 1938 exhibition, "Evening", "Memories of the Past", and "Self Portrait" were highlighted for their deep-toned and thought-provoking spirit. Her landscape painting "Memories of the Past" was singled out for an award and was praised as one which created almost a daily stir at the gallery.

In 1939, one of Mohr's paintings was selected to appear that the New York World's Fair and in 1942 she installed a commissioned piece for the WPA in the post office in Stilwell, Oklahoma. The work, entitled "Cherokee Indian Farming and Animal Husbandry" depicted farming activities and was an oil on canvas installation. Later that year, the couple closed their Cincinnati studio and two years later they moved to Tuscaloosa, Alabama, where Richard began working at the University of Alabama and Mohr took time off to raise their son David. After a seven-year hiatus, she returned to school to study ceramics and textile arts. She submitted works to the National Ceramics Show in Syracuse, New York and won several local prizes for her works. In 1953, Mohr spent the summer studying Mexican weaving techniques at the Instituto Allende in San Miguel de Allende, Mexico and returned to Alabama to complete her degree in Art from the University of Alabama later that year. Soon thereafter, she was diagnosed with cancer and after a lengthy illness, Mohr died April 10, 1955, at Druid City Hospital in Tuscaloosa. She was buried in Portsmouth, Ohio, her husband's childhood home. Rather than flowers, mourners were asked to contribute to a fund which purchased one of Zoellner's paintings to memorialize Mohr at the University of Alabama.
