= Judith Weisenfeld =

American scholar of religion

- Education: Barnard College (AB); Princeton University (MA, PhD)
- Occupations: Scholar, professor
- Employer: Princeton University
- Notable work: African American Women and Christian Activism: New York's Black YWCA, 1905–1945. Hollywood Be Thy Name: African American Religion in American Film, 1929–1949; New World A-Coming: Black Religion and Racial Identity during the Great Migration
- Title: Agate Brown and George L. Collord Professor of Religion
- Website: judithweisenfeld.com

Judith Weisenfeld is an American scholar of religion. She is Agate Brown and George L. Collord Professor of Religion at Princeton University, where she is also the Chair of the Department of Religion. Her research primarily focuses on African-American religion in the first half of the 20th century. In 2019, Weisenfeld was elected to the American Academy of Arts and Sciences.

== Early life and education ==
Weisenfeld was raised Catholic in Queens, NYC, and attended Barnard College, where she graduated cum laude in 1986 with an A. B. degree in religion. She then attended Princeton for her M.A. and Ph.D. (1992), with her dissertation focusing on the Black women's branch of the YWCA in New York in the first half of the 20th century.

== Career ==
Her dissertation became the basis for her first book, African American Women and Christian Activism: New York's Black YWCA, 1905–1945. While in graduate school in Princeton, Weisenfeld also became interested in film, which became a focus of her second book project: Hollywood Be Thy Name: African American Religion in American Film, 1929–1949.

In 2017, Weisenfeld published her third book, New World A-Coming: Black Religion and Racial Identity during the Great Migration. The book develops a "comprehensive study of the formation of early 20th-century black religious movements", incorporating into her analysis religious practices outside the Christian tradition that has traditionally been the focus of such scholarship.

Her fourth book, Black Religion in the Madhouse: Race and Psychiatry in Slavery's Wake was published in 2025. Using "hospital records, court proceedings, newspaper accounts and other documents from a post-Civil War white society that strove to portray Black people as unstable and irrational," Weisenfeld shows how white psychiatrists claimed that "religious excitement" was more prevalent among formerly enslaved African Americans and their descendants.

Weisenfeld taught at Barnard from 1991 until 2000, where she helped to found and lead the Pan-African Studies Program, then Vassar College, where she earned tenure and chaired the Religion Department and served a year as director of the Africana Studies Program.

She joined Princeton's faculty in 2007. In addition to her appointment as in the Department of Religion as Agate Brown and George L. Collord Professor, Weisenfeld is also affiliated with the Department of African American Studies, the Department of History, the Program in Gender and Sexuality Studies, the Program in American Studies and the Center for the Study of Religion.

== Awards and honors ==
- PROSE Award, Psychology and Applied Social Work, Association of American Publishers (2026)
- Barnard Medal of Distinction (2025)
- Elected Member of the American Academy of Arts and Sciences (2019)
- Elected Fellow of the Society of American Historians (2019)
- Albert J. Raboteau Book Prize for the Best Book in Africana Religions (2017)

== Bibliography ==
- ed. with Richard Newman. This Far by Faith: Readings in African-American Women's Autobiography (Routledge, 1996)
- African American Women and Christian Activism: New York's Black YWCA, 1905–1945 (Harvard University Press, 1997)
- Hollywood Be Thy Name: African American Religion in American Film, 1929–1949 (University of California Press, 2007)
- New World A-Coming: Black Religion and Racial Identity during the Great Migration (NYU Press, 2017)
- Black Religion in the Madhouse: Race and Psychiatry in Slavery's Wake (NYU Press, 2026)
