= Kentucky Department for Libraries and Archives =

Collection of resources in Kentucky, U.S.

Kentucky Department for Libraries and Archives is a collection of library and information resources. KDLA's mission is to serve "Kentucky's need to know" through its services "assuring equitable access" to information and services. Many of the materials available from KDLA are public domain.

KDLA's fair use statement: "Fair use" includes activities such as criticism, comment, news reporting, teaching, research, and other related activities.

== History ==
In 1809 the state library was established. The Secretary of State of Kentucky acted as librarian, and it was their duty to collect materials related to legislation. The library was used by the legislature and other members of the government. The entire collection, which was located in the State Capitol burned in a fire in November 1824. The library was reopened in the new Capitol building in the early 1830s. During that time, the state decided to use state librarians to maintain the collection.

Into the twentieth century, the library was called the Law and Legislative Library. The government went through considerable changes in regards to operating the libraries and archives in the twentieth century. In 1936, it officially became known as the Kentucky Department for Libraries and Archives.

== Structure ==
KDLA operates through a commissioner's Office and two major divisions:

- Archives and Records Management
- Library Services

== Services ==
KDLA runs the Kentucky State Digital Archives, digital public records of state and local government agencies with free online searchable access for the public.

The Archives Research Room houses Kentucky's historic public records including:

- City, county and state government records
- Birth and Death Records (1852 through 1910)
- Death certificates 1911–1965
- Marriage Records
- Census records
- Military records
- Judicial records (Civil, Criminal and Court of appeals)
- Wills and Deeds
- State agency records

Since 1969, the Kentucky Talking Book Library has provided audio and Braille materials free to persons with visual, physical, and reading disabilities. Materials are sent by postage-free mail or downloaded from the internet. This service is part of National Library Service for the Blind and Physically Handicapped.

The Bookmobiles and Outreach Service operates a fleet of bookmobiles. This division services those who are isolated, disabled, elderly, institutionalized or otherwise unable to reach a library. This is the modern version of the Pack Horse Library Project, when in 1939 KDLA operated 30 pack horse libraries.

== See also ==
- List of libraries in the United States
