= John W. Blassingame =

American historian (1940–2000)

- Born: John Wesley Blassingame; March 23, 1940; Covington, Georgia, U.S.
- Died: February 13, 2000 (aged 59); New Haven, Connecticut, U.S.
- Known for: Editing the papers of Frederick Douglass
- Spouse: Teasie Jackson Blassingame
- Children: 2

Academic background
- Education: Fort Valley State College; Howard University; Yale University
- Thesis: A Social and Economic Study of the Negro in New Orleans, 1860–1880 (1971)
- Doctoral advisor: C. Vann Woodward
- Other advisor: Rayford Logan

Academic work
- Discipline: History
- Sub-discipline: African-American history
- Institutions: Yale University
- Notable students: Jeffrey C. Stewart; Brenda E. Stevenson
- Notable works: The Slave Community (1972)
- Influenced: Albert J. Raboteau; Brenda E. Stevenson

John Wesley Blassingame (March 23, 1940 – February 13, 2000) was an American historian and pioneer in the study of slavery in the United States. He was the former chairman of the African-American studies program at Yale University. He edited the papers of Frederick Douglass, abolitionist and author.

== Biography ==
Blassingame was born on March 23, 1940, in Covington, Georgia, to Grady and Odessa Blassingame. He received a bachelor's degree at Fort Valley State College (1960), a master's degree at Howard University (1961), and a master's degree (1968) and a doctorate (1971) at Yale University. His doctoral dissertation, written under the supervision of C. Vann Woodward, was titled A Social and Economic Study of the Negro in New Orleans, 1860–1880.

Blassingame taught at Howard University, Carnegie Mellon University, and the University of Maryland, College Park. He joined the faculty at Yale University in 1970 and became a history professor in 1974. He remained at Yale University as a professor of history, African-American studies, and American studies for 29 years.

Blassingame wrote and edited several books, including New Perspectives on Black Studies (1971), The Slave Community: Plantation Life in the Antebellum South (1972), Black New Orleans, 1860–1880 (1973), and Frederick Douglass, the Clarion Voice (1976). In addition, Blassingame collected slave letters, interviews, and other materials in his Slave Testimony: Two Centuries of Letters, Speeches, Interviews, and Autobiographies (1977), which include a large selection of annotated and authenticated accounts of slaves speaking for themselves during the slavery period of Thomas Jefferson, Robert E. Lee, Henry Clay, and others.

From 1979 to 1999, Blassingame worked on editing the papers of Frederick Douglass and published six volumes of Douglass's papers and manuscripts. He also joined several writers in his work of editing and writing. He was a co-author with Mary F. Berry of Long Memory: The Black Experience in America (1982), and a co-editor with Louis Harlan of The Autobiographical Writings of Booker T. Washington (1972).

Blassingame was a lifelong member of many history preservation, heritage, and educational organizations such as the American Historical Association, Southern History Association, the Phi Beta Sigma fraternity, and the Phi Alpha Theta honor society. The John W. Blassingame award is named for him.

Blassingame died on February 13, 2000. According to his son, the cause of death was not known.

== Works ==
- New Perspectives on Black Studies, (1971)
- The Slave Community: Plantation Life in the Antebellum South (1972)
- Black New Orleans, 1860-1880 (1977)
- New Perspectives on Black Studies
- Long Memory: The Black Experience in America, (1981)
