= Federal Writers' Project =

1935–1945 U.S. government New Deal program

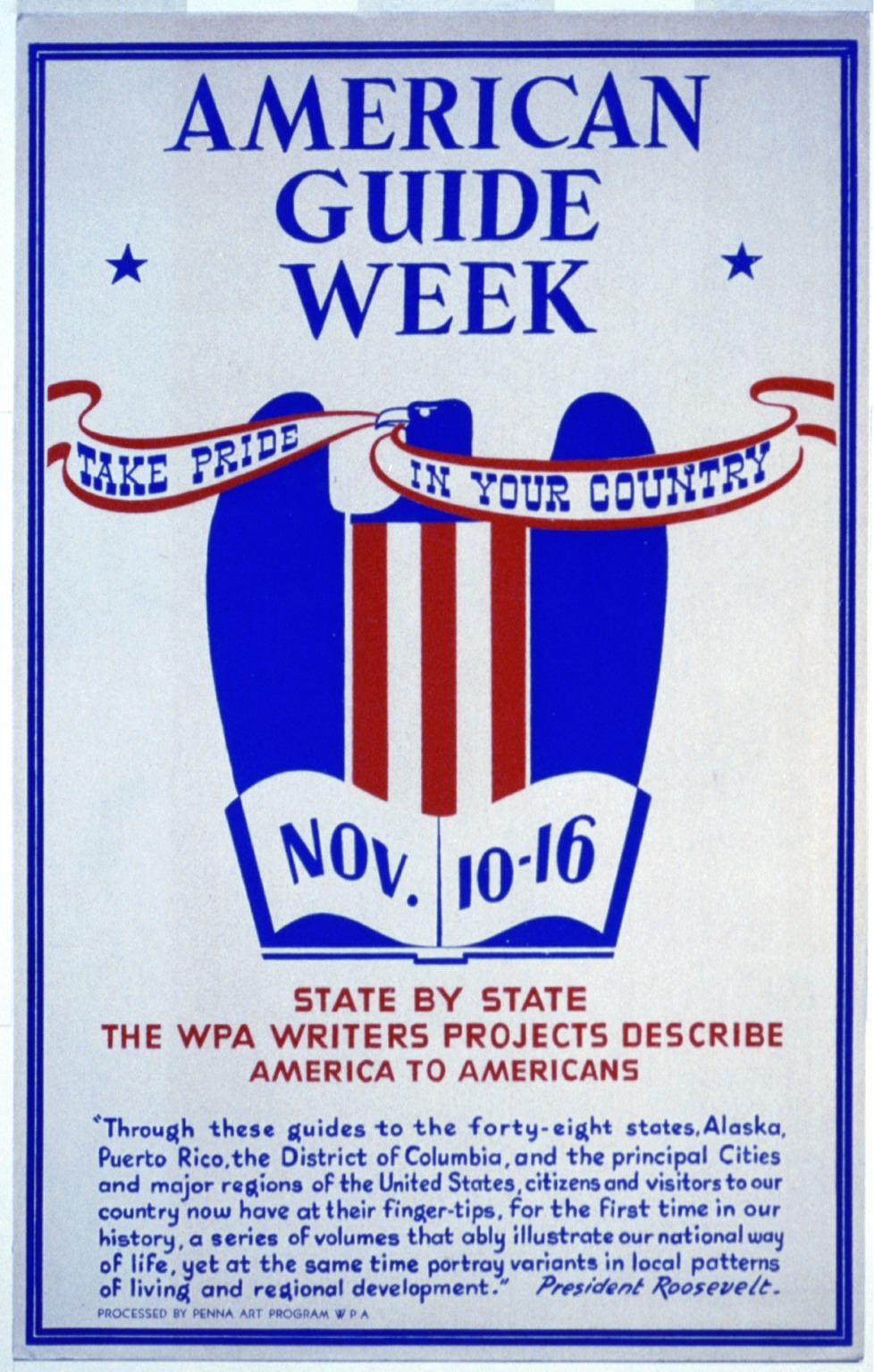
- Poster advertising state-by-state writers projects that "describe America to Americans"

Agency overview
- Formed: July 27, 1935
- Dissolved: 1943
- Headquarters: Washington, D.C., U.S.
- Agency executive: Henry Alsberg
- Parent department: Works Progress Administration

The Federal Writers' Project (FWP) was a federal government project in the United States created to provide jobs for out-of-work writers and to develop a history and overview of the United States, by state, cities and other jurisdictions. It was launched in 1935 during the Great Depression. It was part of the Works Progress Administration (WPA), a New Deal program. It was one of a group of New Deal arts programs known collectively as Federal Project Number One or Federal One.

FWP employed thousands of people and produced hundreds of publications, including state guides, city guides, local histories, oral histories, ethnographies, and children's books. In addition to writers, the project provided jobs to unemployed librarians, clerks, researchers, editors, and historians.

== History ==
Funded under the Emergency Relief Appropriation Act of 1935, FWP was established July 27, 1935, by President Franklin Delano Roosevelt. Henry Alsberg, a lawyer, journalist, playwright, theatrical producer, and human-rights activist, directed the program from 1935 to 1939. In 1939, Alsberg was fired, federal funding was cut, and the project fell under state sponsorship led by John D. Newsom. FWP ended completely in 1943 after the US entered World War II and funds were diverted to the war effort.

An estimated 10,000 people found employment in the FWP. The project was intended not only to provide work relief for unemployed writers, but also to create a unique "self-portrait of America" through publication of histories and guidebooks. From 1935 to 1943, the project cost about $27,000,000 – 0.002% of all WPA appropriations.

== American Guide Series and other publications ==
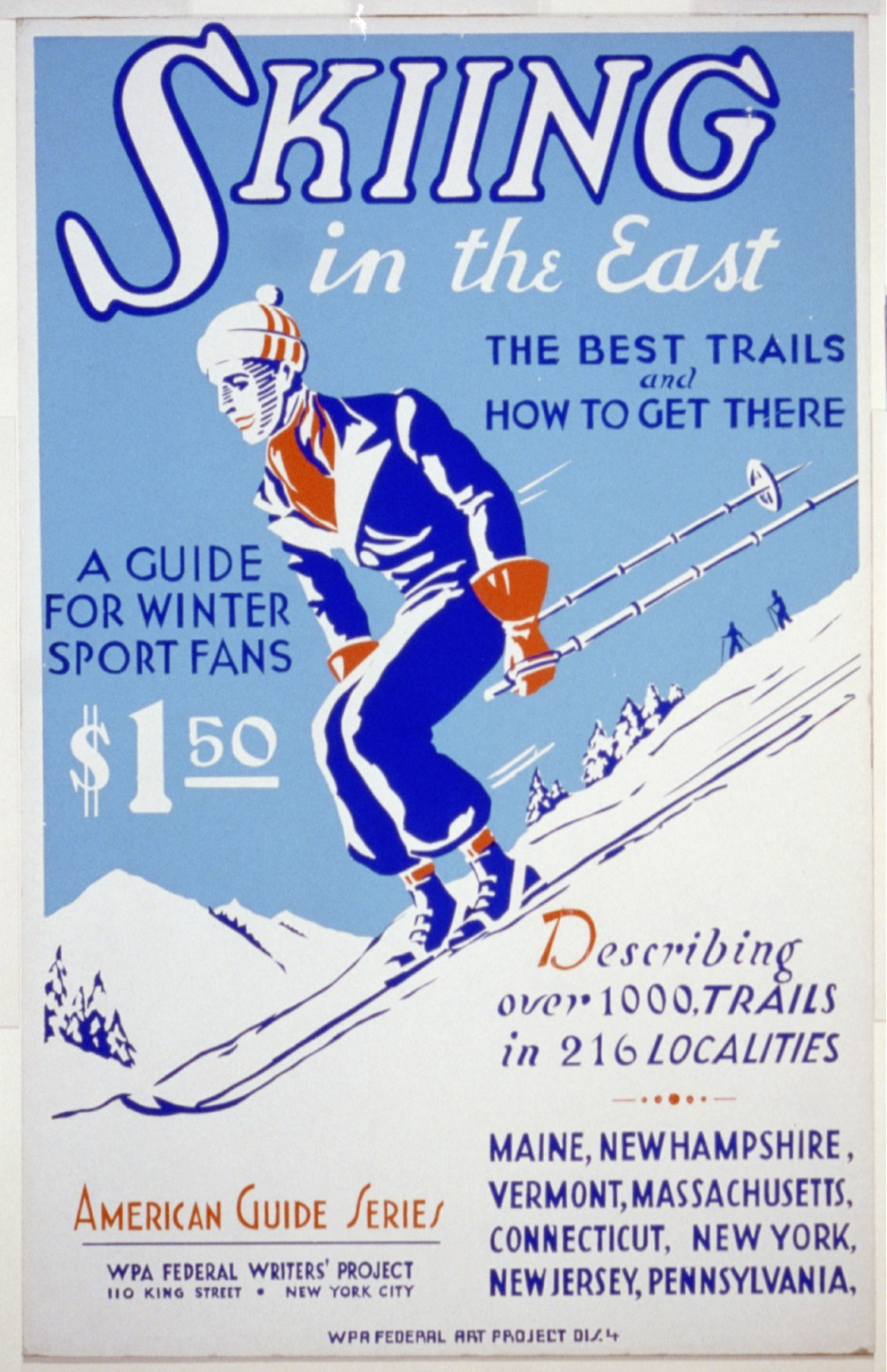
Produced by the Federal Writers' Project, the American Guide Series of books presented American history, geography, and culture, and stimulated travel to bolster the economy during the Great Depression.

The American Guide Series, the most well-known of FWP's publications, consisted of guides to the then 48 states, the Alaska Territory, Puerto Rico, and Washington, D.C. The books were written and compiled by writers from individual states and territories, and edited by Alsberg and his staff in Washington, D.C. The format was generally uniform: each guide included detailed histories of the state or territory, with descriptions of every city and town, automobile travel routes, photographs, maps, and chapters on natural resources, culture, and geography. The inclusion of essays about the various cultures of people living in the states, including immigrants and African Americans, was unprecedented. City books, such as The New York City Guide, were also published as part of the series. Some full-length books are available online at the Internet Archive.

The FWP also published another series, Life In America, and numerous individual titles. Many FWP books were bestsellers, including New England Hurricane: A Factual, Pictorial Record, a rapidly produced volume about the devastation wreaked by the 1938 New England hurricane. Others, such as Cape Cod Pilot, written by author Josef Berger using the pseudonym Jeremiah Digges, received critical acclaim.

In each state, a Writers' Project non-relief staff of editors was formed, along with a much larger group of field workers drawn from local unemployment rolls. The people hired came from a variety of backgrounds, ranging from former newspaper workers to white-collar and blue-collar workers without writing or editing experience.

== Ancillary projects ==
Other programs that emerged from Alsberg's desire to create an inclusive "self-portrait of America" were the Life History and Folklore projects. These consisted of first-person narratives and interviews (collected and conducted by FWP workers), which represented people of various ethnicities, regions, and occupations. According to the Library of Congress website, American Life Histories: Manuscripts from the Federal Writers' Project, 1936 to 1940, the documents "chronicle vivid life stories of Americans who lived at the turn of the century and include tales of meeting Billy the Kid, surviving the 1871 Chicago fire, pioneer journeys out West, grueling factory work, and the immigrant experience. Writers hired by this Depression-era work project included Ralph Ellison, Nelson Algren, May Swenson, and many others."

Among several projects within these first-person narratives was the Southern Life History Project created by William Couch, head of the University of North Carolina Press, and Southeast Regional Director of the Federal Writers' Project. In These Are Our Lives, the only book published by the Southern Life History project, Couch explained that their goal was to "get life histories which are readable and faithful representations of living persons, and which taken together, will give a fair picture of the structure and working of society."

A short-lived FWP project was called America Eats, a proposed book of the regional foodways of the United States. Writers in each state were tasked with gathering information about foods and food-related events unique to their area, and preparing essays about these. The country was divided into five regions: the Northeast, the South, the Middle West, the Far West, and the Southwest. While materials, in various quantities, were gathered from all five regions, the book America Eats! was never completed and published. The United States entry into World War II in 1943 resulted in a loss of funding for the FWP and its projects. Materials from the America Eats project are held in various archives and libraries around the country, including at the Library of Congress and the Montana State University Archives and Special Collections. A large digital archive called What America Ate has been created to house the digitized remains of the project.

=== Ethnologies and integration ===
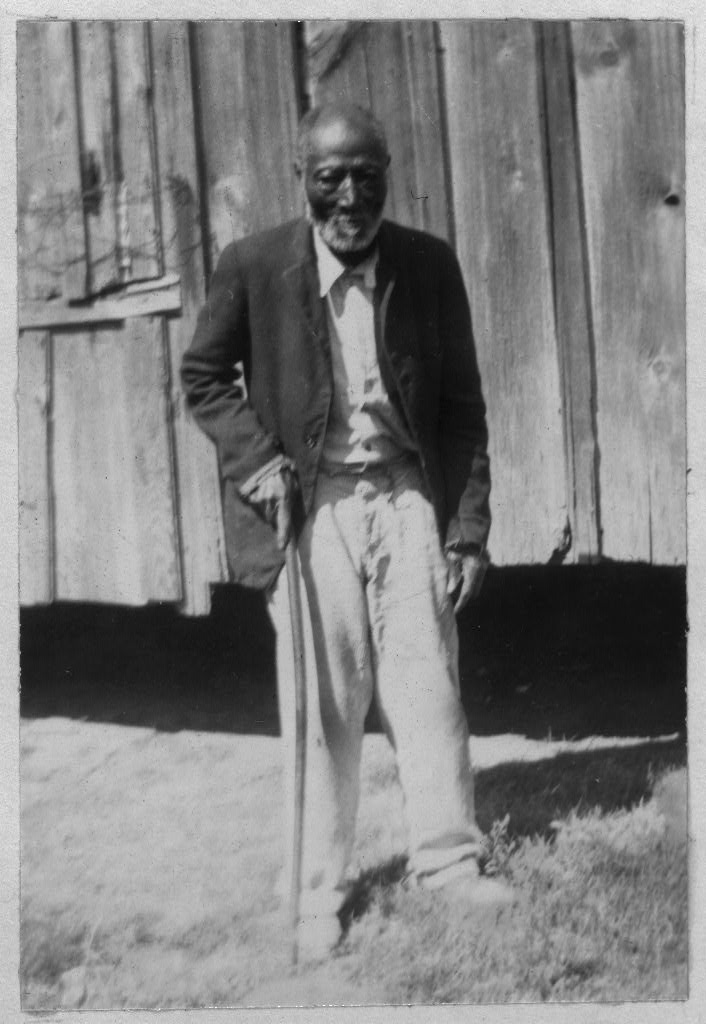
George Dillard's oral history was recorded in 1936 for the Slave Narrative Collection by the Federal Writers' Project.

- Notable FWP projects included the Slave Narrative Collection, a set of interviews that culminated in more than 2,300 first-person accounts of slavery and 500 black-and-white photographs of former slaves. Many of these narratives are available online from the above-named collection at the Library of Congress website. Folklorist Benjamin A. Botkin was instrumental in insuring the survival of these manuscripts. Among the many researchers and authors who have used this collection are Colson Whitehead, who drew from it for his Pulitzer Prize-winning novel, The Underground Railroad.
- The Virginia Negro Studies Project employed 16 African-American writers and culminated in the publication of The Negro in Virginia (1940). Notably, it included photographs by Robert McNeill, now remembered as a groundbreaking African-American photographer.
- African-American writer Zora Neale Hurston was employed by the Florida Writers' Project. Years after her death, her unpublished works from this time were compiled in Go Gator and Muddy the Water: Writings by Zora Neale Hurston from the Federal Writers' Project (1999).
- Previously unpublished records from the Pennsylvania project were published by the University of Pittsburgh Press in 2004 under the title The WPA History of the Negro in Pittsburgh.
- The South Carolina Negro Writers' Project also did a study of African-American life in the state in 1936 and 1937, although none of it was published at the time.
- The Oklahoma WPA produced the 100-volume Indian-Pioneer Project.
- The Illinois Writers' Project was racially integrated. Among its directors was Jacob Scher. The Chicago project employed Arna Bontemps, an established voice of the Harlem Renaissance, and helped to launch the literary careers of African-American writers such as Richard Wright, Margaret Walker, Katherine Dunham, and Frank Yerby.

== Controversies ==
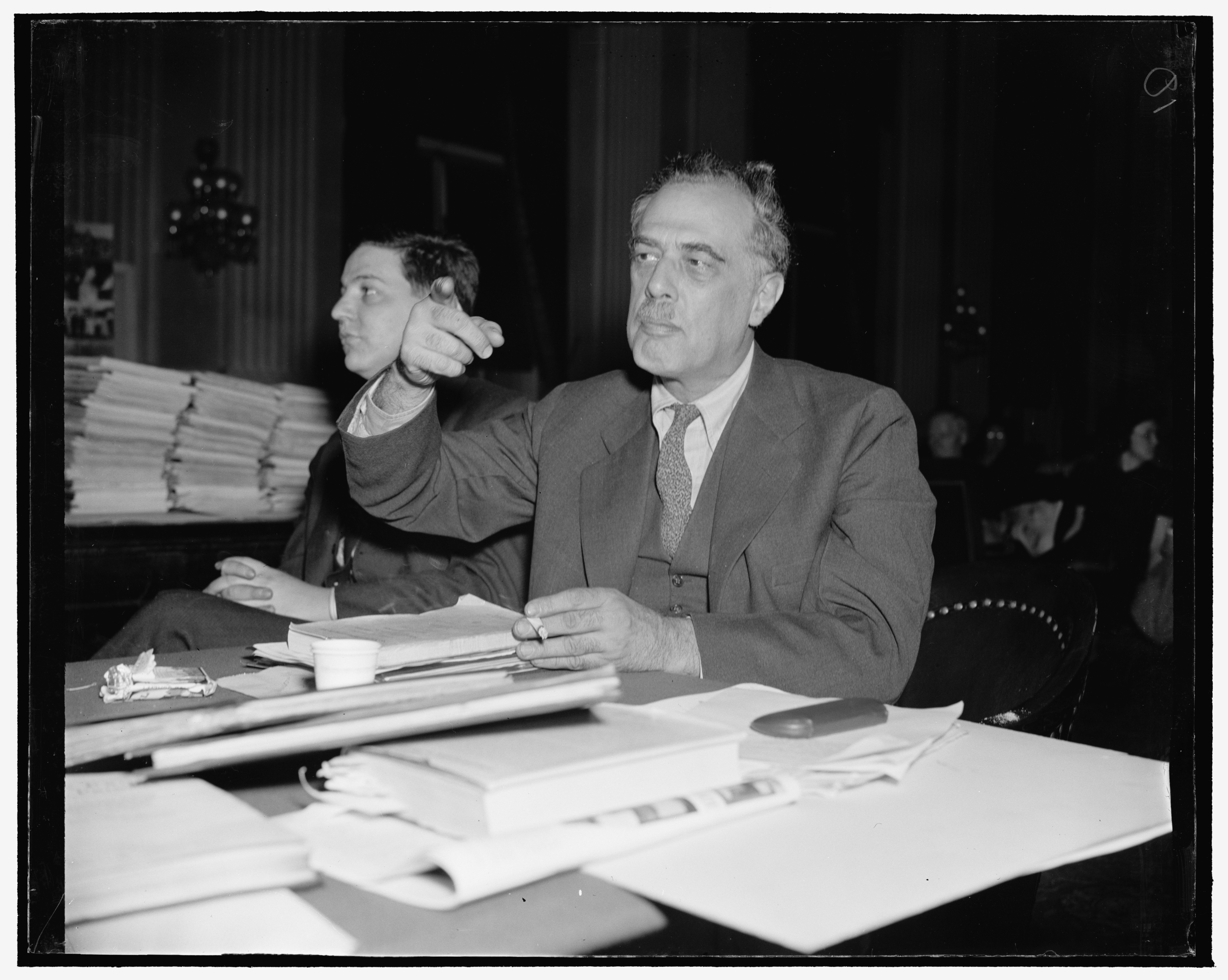
Henry Alsberg testifying before the House Un-American Activities Committee in December 1938

For most of its lifetime, the FWP faced a barrage of criticism from American conservatives. When Massachusetts: A Guide to its Places and People, was published, it was lauded by government officials, including Governor Charles F. Hurley. But the day after its publication, "conservatives attacked the book over its essays on the 1912 Lawrence textile strike and other labor issues. Such critics were even more scathing about the coverage of the Sacco and Vanzetti affair." Scholars called the questionable passages fair accounts; the controversy helped increase book sales.

The most poisonous attacks against the FWP came from the House Un-American Activities Committee (HUAC) and its chair, Congressman Martin Dies Jr. of Texas. Alsberg and Hallie Flanagan, his counterpart at the Federal Theatre Project, faced tremendous scrutiny from the committee. The Dies HUAC committee, like the McCarthy committee of the 1950s, "used inquisitorial scare tactics, innuendo, and unsupported accusations." Alsberg, Flanagan, and others who were accused of supporting the communist agenda could not "examine evidence against them, could not produce their own witnesses, could not cross-examine accusers." Accusations that communist activities were carried out openly, and that Soviets funded labor unions, which took control of the arts' projects, were found to be false. Author Richard Wright, a future Guggenheim scholar, was often under attack, with his writings pronounced as "vile". Among the many charges leveled by HUAC against the FWP and its workers, was that Richard Wright was not born in the United States. (He was born in Mississippi.) Alsberg wrote a long court brief and provided supporting documents to refute each charge.

First Lady Eleanor Roosevelt supported the FWP, as did such mainstream publishing companies such as Viking Press, Random House, and Alfred A. Knopf, each of which published some of the books.

By 1939, HUAC's tactics seemed to work, and the newly elected Congress cut the WPA budget in the Emergency Relief Appropriation Act of 1939 while increasing HUAC's funding. In January 1939, 6,000 people were laid off from Federal One. By July 1939, Congress voted to eliminate the Theatre Project, which had been criticized for communist influence. Federal sponsorship for the Federal Writers' Project ended in 1939. The program was permitted to continue under state sponsorship, with some federal employees, until 1943. In the last months of the FWP's operation, Henry Alsberg was fired.

He continued to work past his firing date in order to meet contractual arrangements with the publishers of three upcoming American Guide books. By the time of his departure in 1939, the FWP had published 321 works; hundreds more remained in various stages of publication. Some were published in the years leading up to 1943 under the renamed Writers' Program. Others were never completed. Over the lifetime of the FWP and the Writers' Program, 10,000 people were estimated to be employed.

In the 1937 musical The Cradle Will Rock, funded by the Federal Theater Project, composer Marc Blitzstein incorporated some of opponents' efforts to prevent this production.

== Film ==
In September 2009 a documentary about FWP, Soul of a People: Writing America's Story, premiered on the Smithsonian Channel . It was funded by the National Endowment for the Humanities.The film includes interviews with American authors Studs Terkel and Stetson Kennedy, and American historian Douglas Brinkley. A companion book was published by Wiley & Sons as Soul of a People: The WPA Writers' Project Uncovers Depression America.

The Slave Narrative Collection was featured in the HBO documentary, Unchained Memories: Readings from the Slave Narratives. The film includes actors Angela Bassett and Samuel L. Jackson performing dramatic readings of selected transcripts.

The 1999 film Cradle Will Rock, by Tim Robbins, while depicting the events of the Federal Theatre Project (FTP), dramatizes the attacks against Federal One by HUAC. Its efforts resulted in closing both the FTP and the FWP.

== Proposal for a new Federal Writers' Project ==
In the wake of the 2020 COVID-19 pandemic and consequent global economic disruption, several writers and politicians called for a new U.S. Federal Writers' Project. In May 2021, on the anniversary of the original project, Congressman Ted Lieu and Congresswoman Teresa Leger Fernandez introduced legislation to create a new FWP, to be administered by the Department of Labor, that would hire unemployed and underemployed writers. Supporters of the legislation included writers James Fallows, Ruth Dickey, and Jonathan Lethem.

== Notable participants ==
- Conrad Aiken
- Nelson Algren
- William Attaway
- Saul Bellow
- Arna Bontemps
- Benjamin Botkin
- Max Bodenheim
- John Cheever
- Richard Durham
- Arnold S. Eagle
- Loren Eiseley
- Eliot Elisofon
- Ralph Ellison
- Vardis Fisher
- Irving Fishman
- Robert Hayden
- Leon Srabian Herald
- Zora Neale Hurston
- Weldon Kees
- Stetson Kennedy
- Claude McKay
- Vincent McHugh
- Mabel Montgomery
- Harry Partch
- Kenneth Patchen
- Kenneth Rexroth
- May Swenson
- Studs Terkel
- Jim Thompson
- Margaret Walker
- Dorothy West
- Walker Winslow
- Richard Wright
- Frank Yerby
- Anzia Yezierska

== Gallery ==
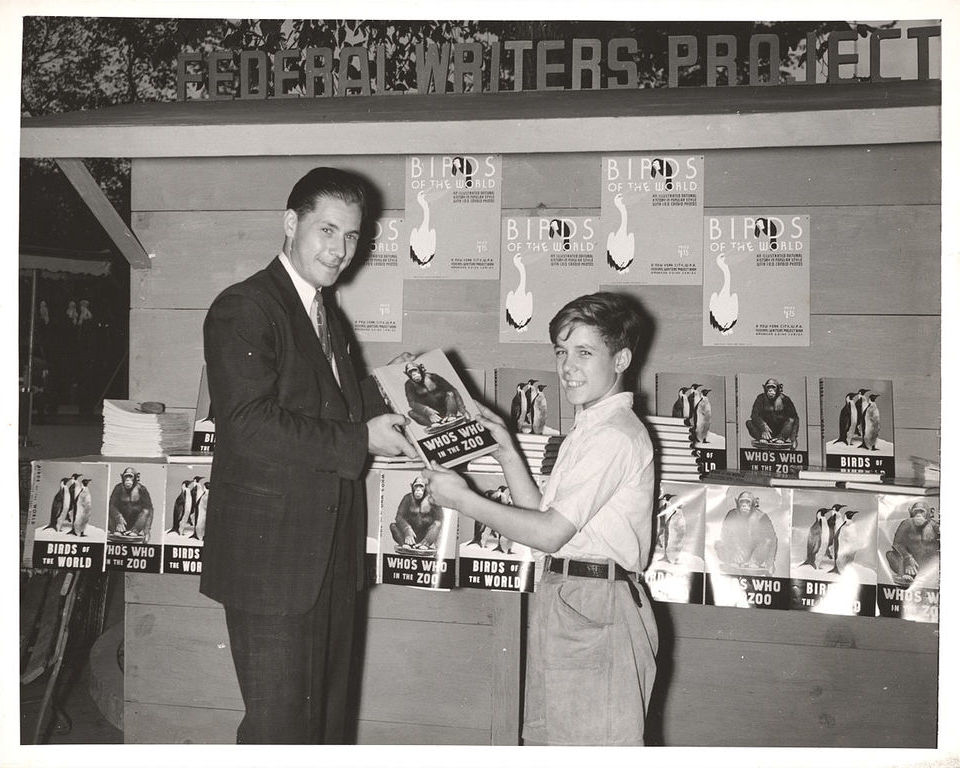
Display for Who's Who in the Zoo, part of the Children's Science Series created by authors in the Federal Writers' Project

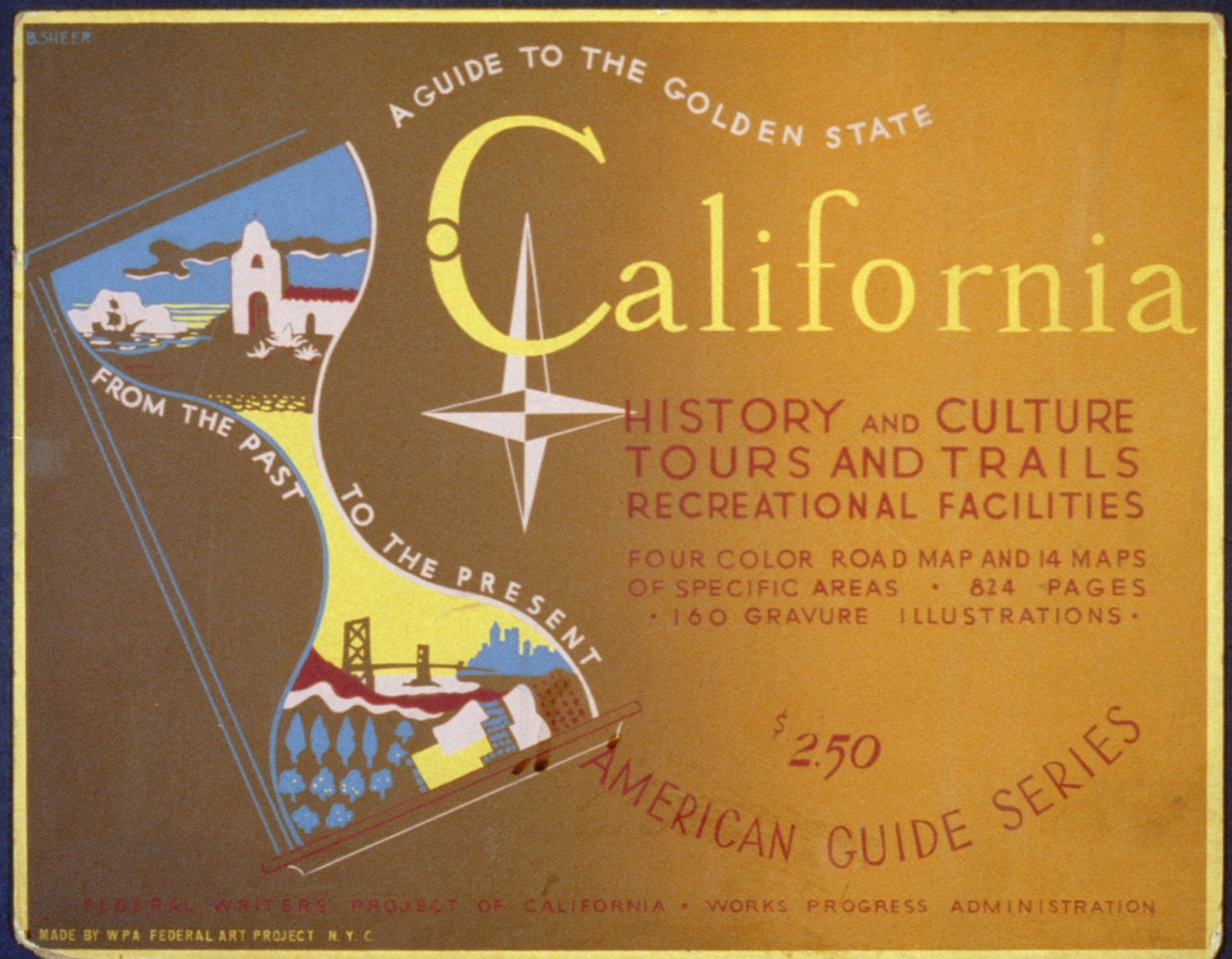
Federal Writers' Project of California poster advertising the American Guide Series volume on California, 1936–1941

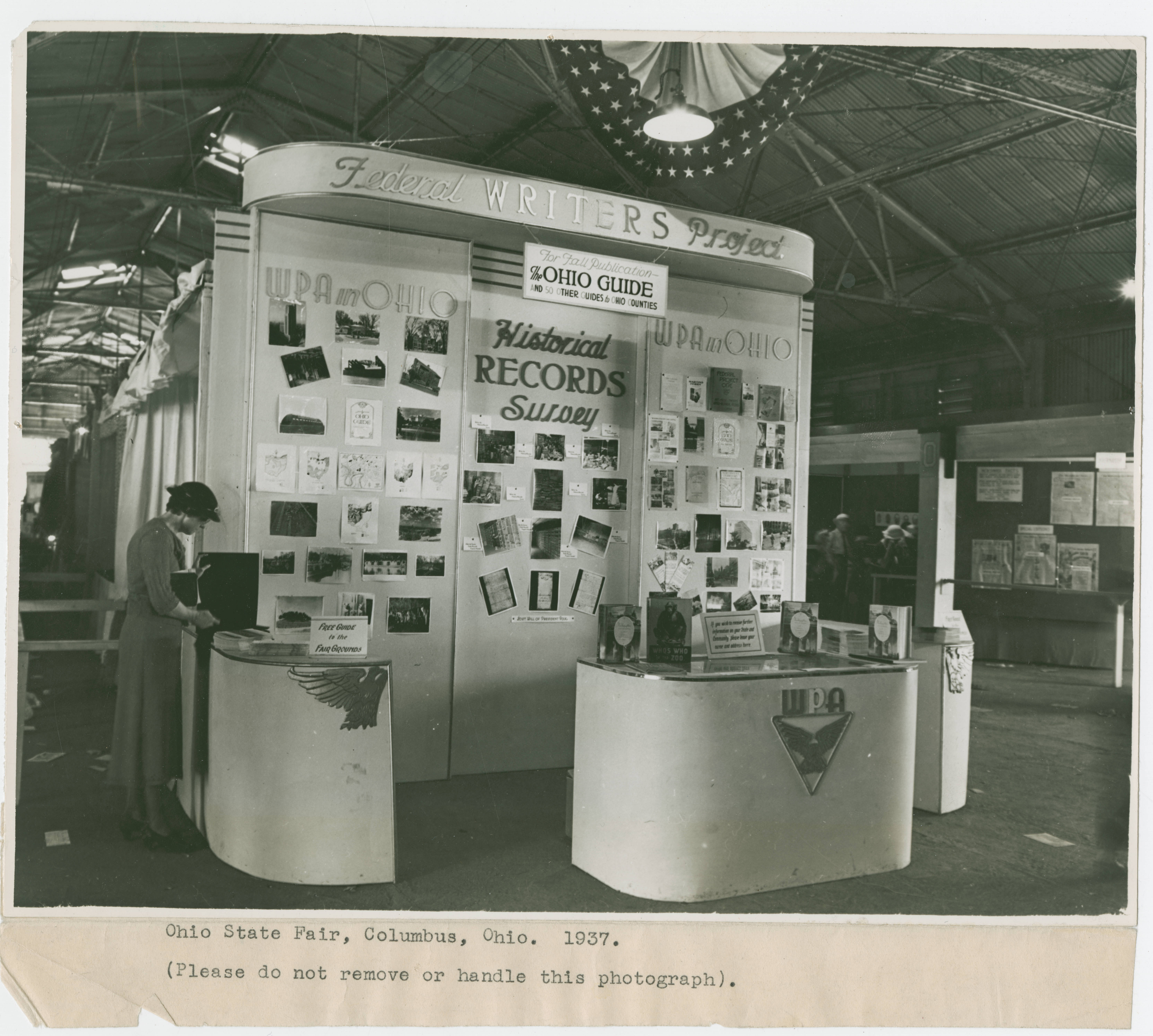
A book exhibit at the Ohio State Fair for the Federal Writers' Project in 1937

The Book of Stones, part of the children's science series created by the Federal Writers Project and published in Pennsylvania in 1939

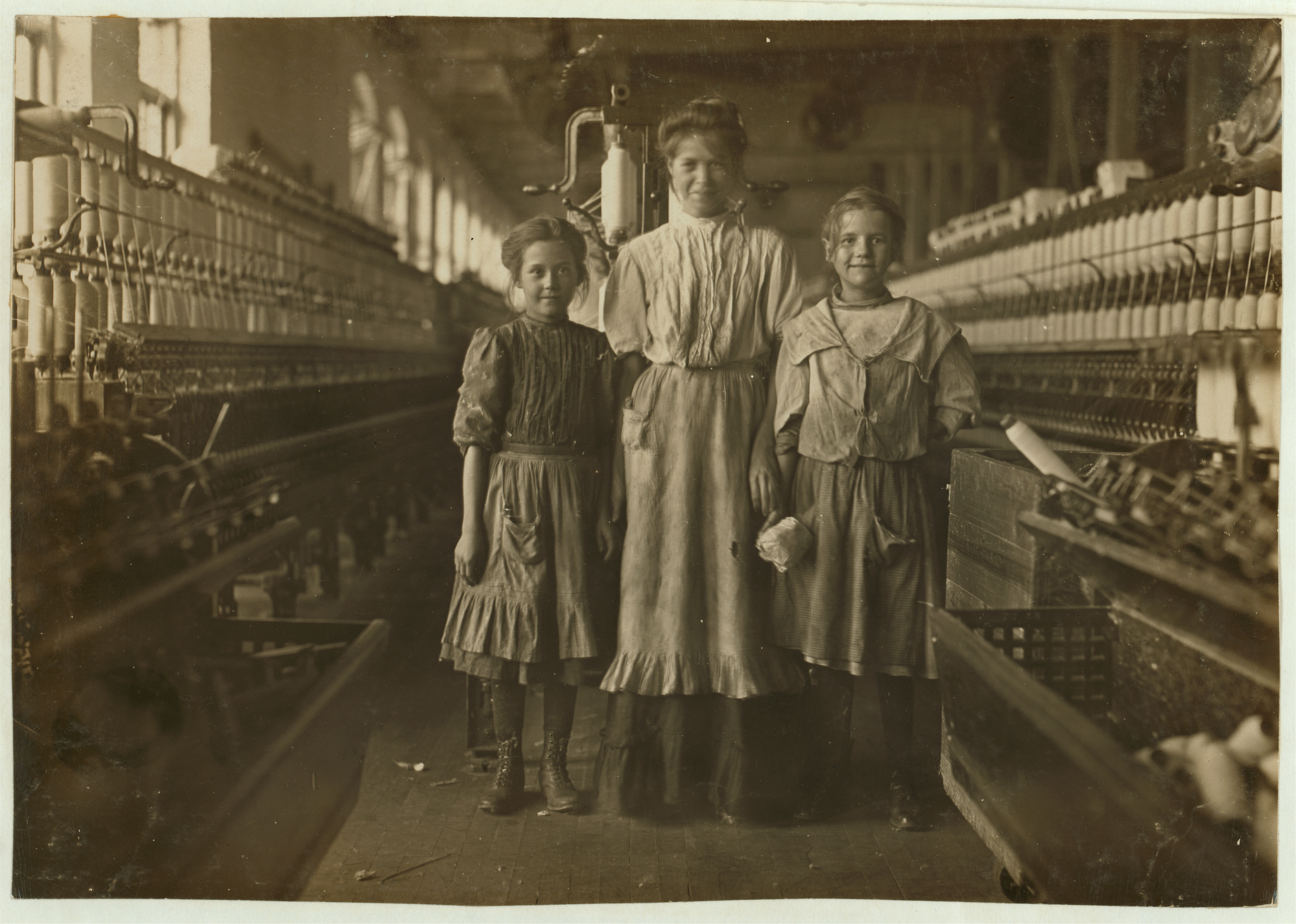
North Carolina oral history project by the Federal Writers' Project, documenting child laborers at a local mill in Lincolnton

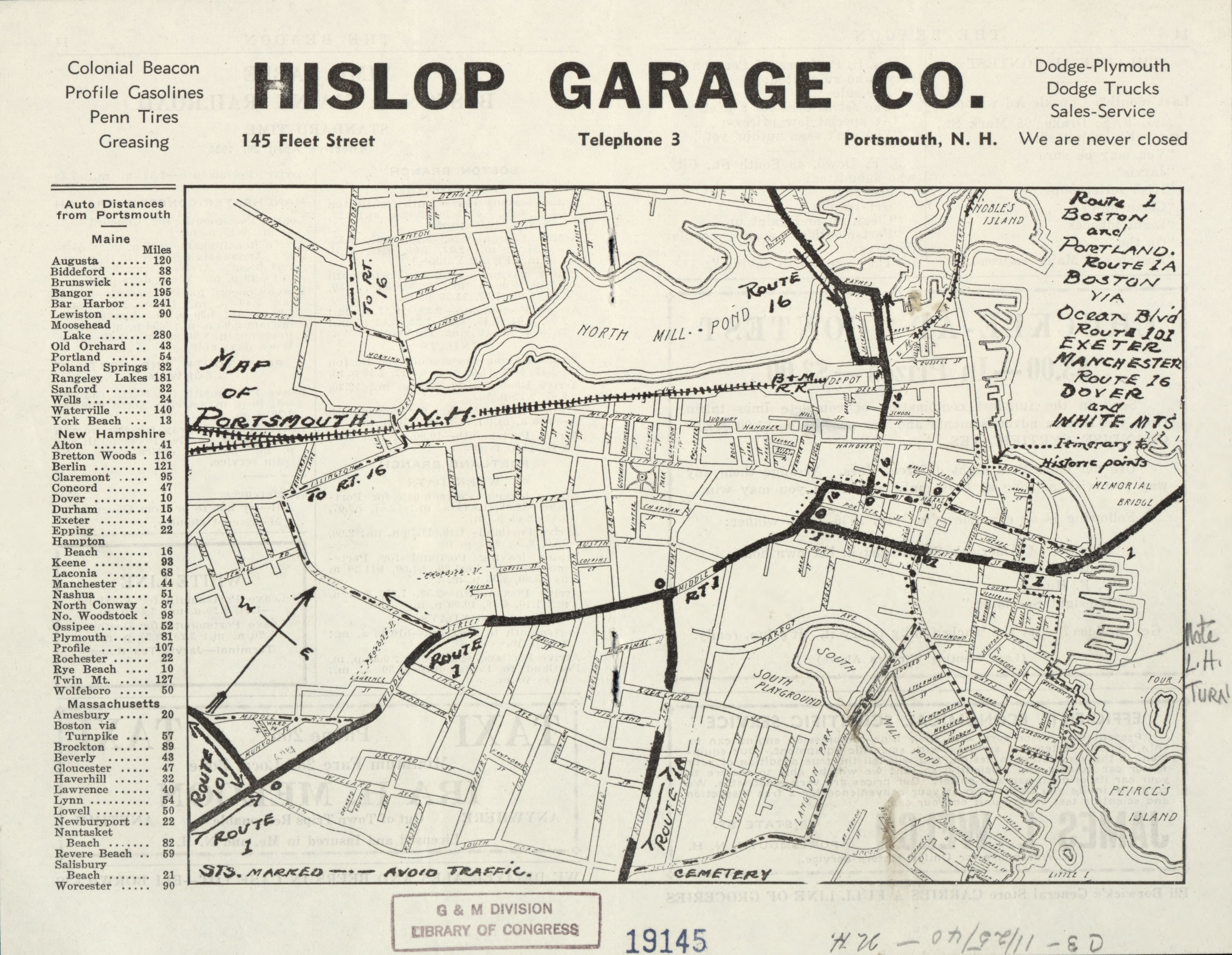
A map of the town of Portsmouth for New Hampshire: A Guide to the Granite State by Federal Writers' Project, 1927

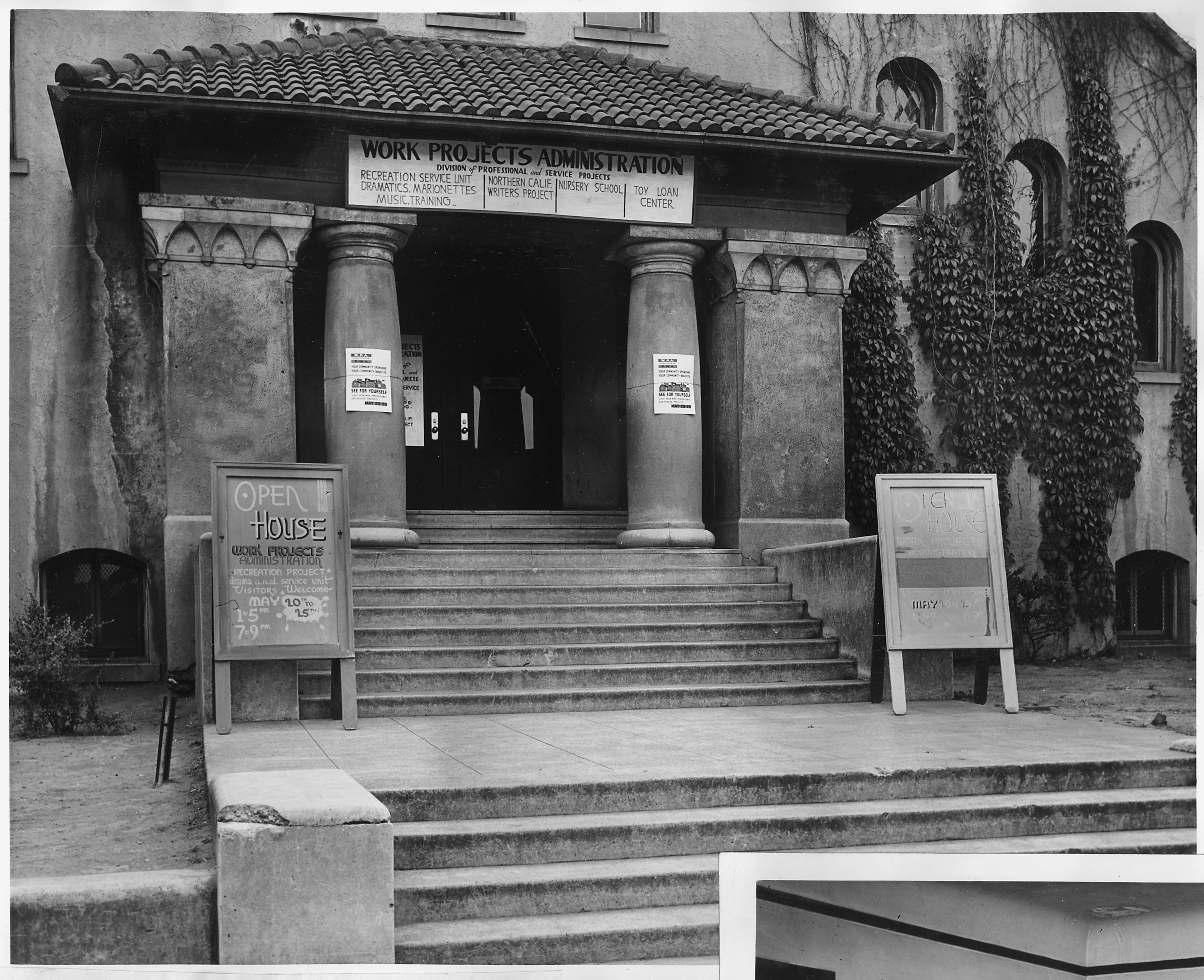
A photo of a California Federal Writers' Project location within a Works Progress Administration building in Oakland, 1940

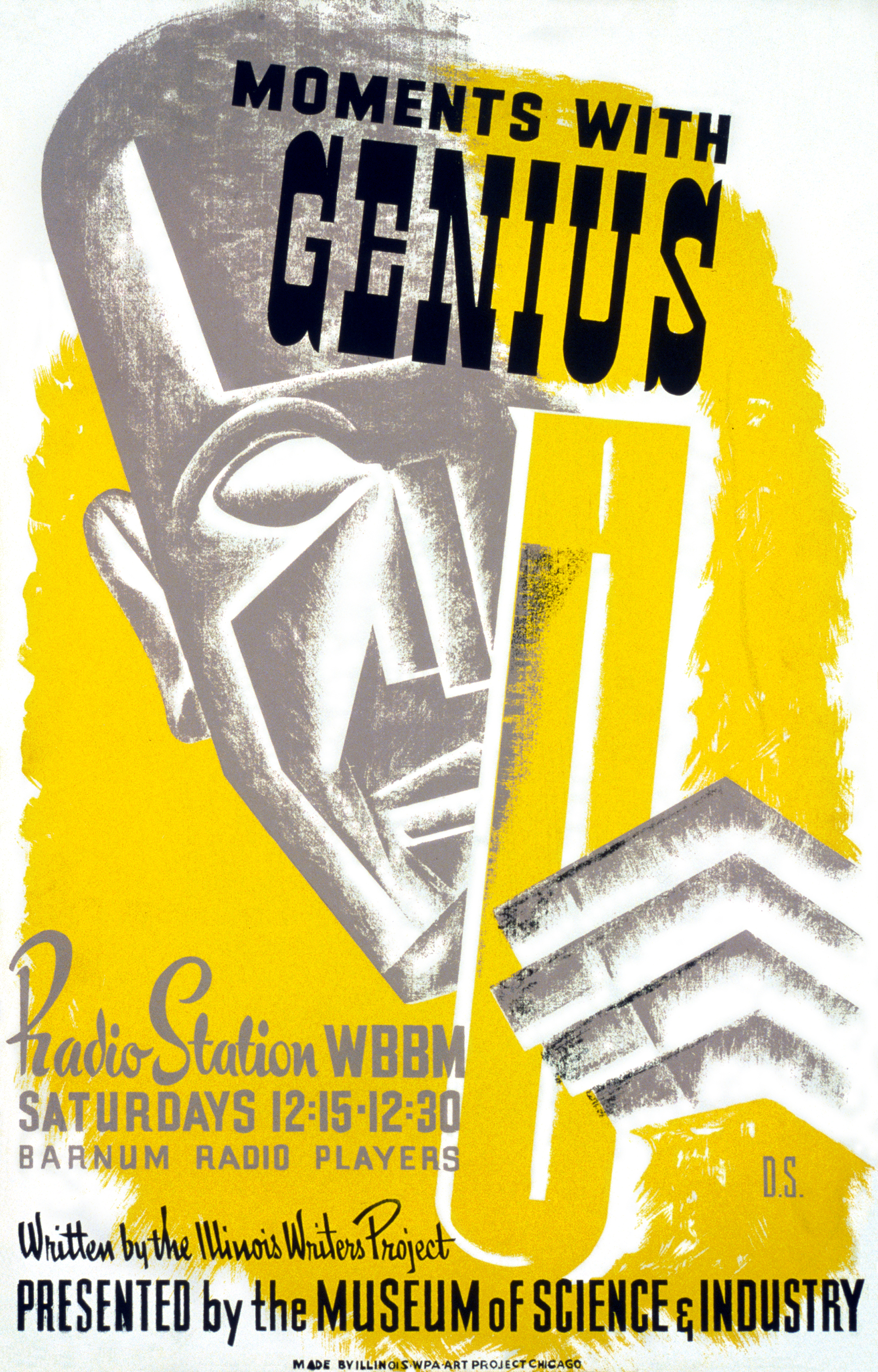
Poster for the Illinois Writers' Project radio series Moments with Genius, presented by the Museum of Science and Industry (c. 1939)
