= List of South Carolina slave traders =

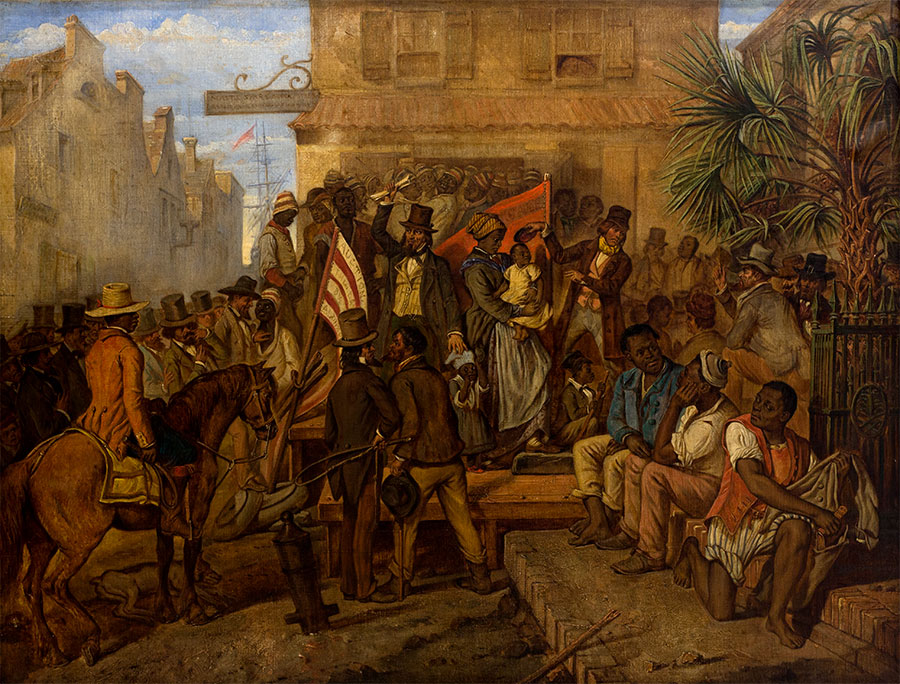
Portrait of Alonzo J. White in Eyre Crowe's Auction at Charleston; the red flag on the right was a traditional signal that a slave sale was imminent

This is a list of slave traders in South Carolina from the colonial period until 1865. Charleston was the "primary port" in the United States for the transatlantic slave trade, and interregional trading continued until the American Civil War.

- J. A. Addison, Edgefield
- T. Adkins, Hamburg
- T. D. Adkins, Hamburg
- Thomas Alexander, Charleston
- George Austin, Charleston
- Robert Austin
- J. Russell Baker, Charleston
- L. H. Belser, Sumter District
- John H. Blake, Charleston
- D. N. Boozer, Greenwood
- Samuel Browne
- H. G. Burkett, Sumter District
- Capers & Heyward, Charleston
- J. W. Clinkscales, Greenwood
- Jacob Cohen & Son, Charleston
- E. M. Cobb, Anderson
- J. Crews, Laurens
- H. C. Culbreath, Edgefield District
- J. E. Cureton, Lancaster
- H. H. DeLeon, Charleston
- Louis D. DeSaussure, Charleston
- G. DeWitt, Charleston
- T. J. Dinkins, Sumter District
- Charles E. R. Drayton, Charleston
- W. L. Ellis, Orangeburg
- Joseph W. Faber, Charleston
- J. Drayton Ford, Charleston
- J. W. Ford, Kershaw District
- A. Forsyth, Columbia
- W. H. Fox, Lexington District
- Thomas Norman Gadsden, called "Norman Gadsden," Charleston
- W. Q. Gardener, Hamburg
- John Guerard, Charleston
- John M. Gilchrist, Charleston
- William Allston Gourdin, Charleston
- R. B. Holeman, Newberry District
- D. Hughes
- J. A. Houston, Edgefield District
- Thomas M. Hume, Charleston
- A. J. Hydrick, Orangeburg District
- E. Kelly, Greenville District
- E. S. Irvine, Greenville
- O. B. Irvine, Greenville
- James Jervey, Charleston
- Lewis Jervey, Charleston
- Jervey, Blake & Waring, Charleston
- Jervey, Waring & White, Charleston
- J. P. Laborde
- Henry Laurens, Charleston
- Hutson Lee
- J. C. Lipford
- C. Logan, Columbia
- P. L. Lockwood, Charleston
- R. M. Marshall
- M. McBride, Charleston
- B. McCall, Charleston
- E. McElveen, Sumter District
- L. D. Merrimon, Greenwood
- B. Mordecai, Charleston
- T. P. Moseley, Cokesbury
- W. J. Nettles
- R. J. Nickels, Laurens District
- Francis Nipson, Charleston
- Ziba B. Oakes, Charleston
- C. M. Olsen, Charleston
- J. Ottolengui, Charleston
- R. M. Owings, Hamburg
- J. Pape, Camden
- J. T. Parks, Greenwood
- William Payne
- P. J. Porcher & Baya, Charleston
- C. J. Pride
- Robert Pringle, Charleston
- Robert Raper, Charleston
- J. S. Ryan, Charleston
- Thomas Ryan & Son, Charleston
- W. B. Ryan, Charleston
- Rhett & Fitzsimons, Charleston
- J. S. Riggs, Charleston
- T. L. Rodgers, Charleston
- A. J. Salinas, Charleston
- S. Sampson, Georgetown
- J. A. Satterwhite, Columbia
- G. Seaborn, Anderson
- J. M. E. Sharp, Columbia
- Shingler brothers, Charleston
- William Simons, Charleston
- Seth Spencer, Charleston
- W. Spires, Hamburg
- R. Steedman, Lexington District
- J. W. Suber, Abbeville
- A. G. Teague, Edgefield
- E. P. Teague, Edgefield
- A. Vance
- Verree & Blair, Charleston
- Morton A. Waring, Charleston
- C. Warren, Edgefield District
- T. C. Weatherly, Bennettsville
- Alonzo J. White, Charleston
- T. A. Whitney, Charleston
- Wilbur & Son, Charleston
- Henry Willis Sr. & Jr., Charleston
- Samuel Wragg, Georgetown

== See also ==
- Charleston Workhouse
- Hamburg, South Carolina slave market
- List of North Carolina slave traders
- Bibliography of the slave trade in the United States

== Sources ==
- Bancroft, Frederic (2023) [1931, 1996]. Slave Trading in the Old South (Original publisher: J. H. Fürst Co., Baltimore). Southern Classics Series. Introduction by Michael Tadman (Reprint ed.). Columbia, S.C.: University of South Carolina Press. ISBN 978-1-64336-427-8. LCCN 95020493. OCLC 1153619151.
- O'Malley, Gregory E. (April 2017). "Slavery's Converging Ground: Charleston's Slave Trade as the Black Heart of the Lowcountry". The William and Mary Quarterly. 74 (2): 271–302. doi:10.5309/willmaryquar.74.2.0271.
- Tadman, Michael (1977). Speculators and slaves in the old South: a study of the American domestic slave trade, 1820–1860 (Thesis). University of Hull.
