= Lebbeus (disambiguation) =

Lebbeus is a genus of shrimp.

Lebbeus may also refer to:

- Jude the Apostle, also Lebbeus
- Lebbeus Bailey (1763–1823), American clockmaker
- Lebbeus Egerton (1773–1846), tenth lieutenant governor of Vermont
- Lebbeus Harris (1713–1792), member of the Nova Scotia House of Assembly
- Alfred Lebbeus Loomis (1831–1895), American physician
- Henry Lebbeus Oak (1866–1926), American historian
- Lebbeus Thomas "LT" Overton (born 2004), American professional football player
- Lebbeus H. Rogers (1847–1932), American inventor and businessman
- Lebbeus Simkins (c. 1836 – 1884), recipient of the Medal of Honor
- Lebbeus Woods (1940–2012), American architect
- Lebbeus R. Wilfley (1866–1926), American attorney
- Lebbeus Zevely (died 1873), American politician and founder of the Unterrified Democrat

== See also ==
- Lebbeus Ford House
