= The Great Charleston Slave Sale =

- Newspaper Article advertising the Slave Sale, from Charleston Courier, 1835
- Date: February 24, 1835
- Location: Charleston, South Carolina
- Type: Largest known single sale of Slaves in U.S. History
- Organized by: Jervey, Waring & White
- Participants: James Jervey, Morton Waring, Alonzo White

The Great Charleston Slave Sale or the John Ball Jr. Estate Slave Auction was a slave auction held in Charleston, South Carolina, by the firm Jervey, Waring & White. The firm sold six hundred enslaved Africans at market and made US$222,800 (equivalent to $6,953,516 in 2025). Currently, it is the largest known single sale of slaves in U.S. History.

== Background ==
In 1834 a wealthy planter by the name of John Ball Jr. died, leaving behind a vast estate. His heirs did not want his estate, so much of it was put up for public auction, being given to Jervey, Waring & White to sell.

== The Slave Sale ==
The slave auction was held on February 24, 1835, at 24 Broad Street in Charleston. The firm sold the six hundred enslaved africans at market and made US$222,800 (equivalent to $6,953,516 in 2025). Ball's heir Ann Ball bought 215 of the 600 for US$79,855 (equivalent to $2,492,249 in 2025).

== Legacy ==
Today at the location of the auction, a memorial plaque has been erected, commemorating the significance of what happened. Today the event is felt deeply by local African-American communities who feel the recently unearthed event strikes a chord with their struggles today. Its newfound significance and place above that of the “weeping time” auction, gave reason to remember it.
