= Alonzo J. White (slave trader) =

American slave trader (1810–1885)

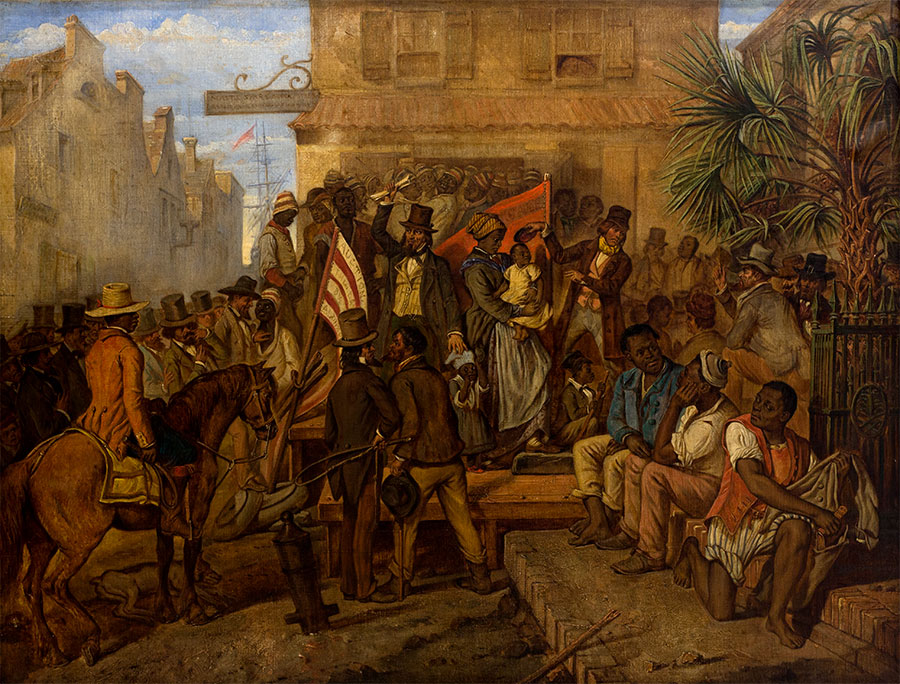
- Portrait of White in Eyre Crowe's Auction at Charleston; the red flag on the right was a traditional signal that a slave sale was imminent
- Born: March 23, 1812; Charleston, South Carolina, U.S.
- Died: July 1, 1885 (aged 73); Charleston, South Carolina, U.S.
- Occupations: Slave trader, real estate broker, investment broker, auctioneer
- Known for: largest auction of enslaved people in U.S. history

Alonzo James White (March 22, 1812 – July 1, 1885) was an American businessman and slave trader from Charleston, South Carolina who was known as a "notorious" and prolific auctioneer who oversaw the sales of thousands, if not tens of thousands, of slaves in his 30-year career in the American slave trade. He was also a partner in Jervey, Waring & White with Morton A. Waring and James Jervey.

== Antebellum life and work ==
According to the family bible record kept by White's father, attorney John Blake White, "my third son was born, and was baptised Alonzo James on the 22nd May, following by the Revd. Mr. Fowler, at St. Phillips Church, my sister Sarah & myself being his sponsors...In November 1813, My dear Eliza was taken ill with measles, with which she was very ill. Shortly after, all of our children were taken with the same disease altogether; with whom it has as yet proven very favorable. Except Alonzo, they have all had the whooping cough—and by means of the blessed discovery of the vaccine, they have escaped that terrible disease, the small pox." Eliza Allston White died in 1817, when Alonzo was five years old.

By 1835, when he was 23 years old, Alonzo J. White, as the junior partner in the firm Jervey, Waring & White, participated in what is believed to be the largest auction of enslaved people in U.S. history, the sale at auction of the 600 people who were legally enslaved by John Ball Jr. Contemporary scholars have estimated that the total sale price was about US$222,800 (equivalent to $6,953,516 in 2025). White's take would have been US$1,856 (equivalent to $57,925 in 2025) if Jervey, Waring & White took the typical 2.5 percent sales commission, split three ways.

On March 29, 1838, 26-year-old Alonzo J. White married Eliza Ingraham at Charleston. Almost exactly nine months later, on December 26, 1838, their first child was born, son Abbot Brisbane White. At the time of the 1840 census White lived in a Charleston household with five free whites, one free person of color, and five enslaved black or mixed-race people. A daughter, Martha Allston White, was born in October 1840. According to the family Bible, babies came regularly for the next few years: "Blake Leay, third child of Alonzo & Eliza White, born the 20th September, 1842. Alonzo James their fourth child, Born the 21st March 1845. Eliza Allston, their fifth child born 19th January 1847. 23rd May 1849, a sixth child, a son of Alonzo J. & Eliza M. White, born this day, was baptised 17th June in extremis, Nathanial Ingraham." On November 1, 1849, Billy, a servant of White, and Phillis, a (servant of Dr. T. Y. Simons), were married by the Rev. Paul Trapier at Mrs. Dehon's house, "before many witnesses, with consent of owners."

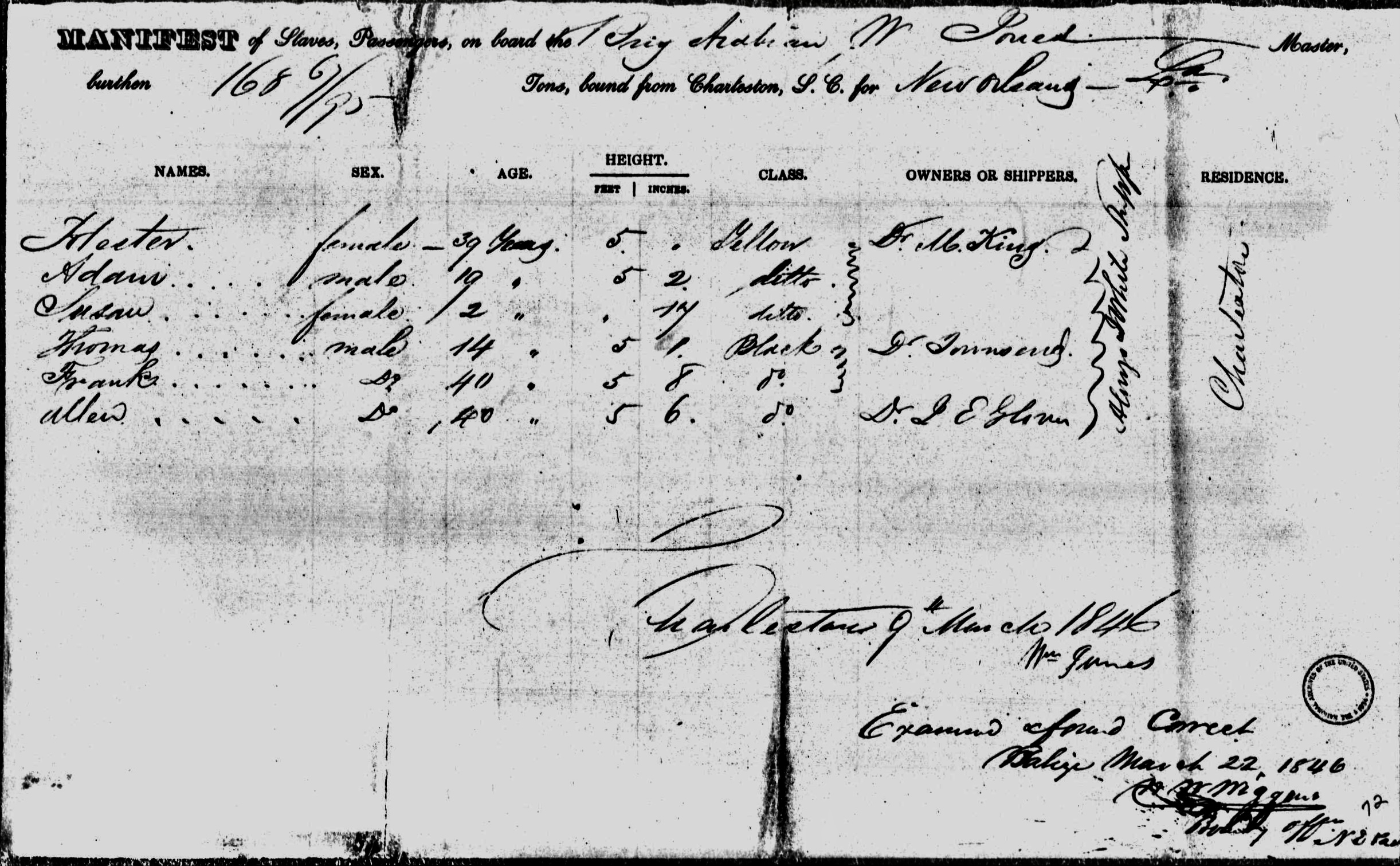
In March 1846, Alonzo J. White shipped six enslaved people, Hester, Adam, two-year-old Susan, Thomas, Frank and Allen, via the brig Arabian, from Charleston to New Orleans

At the time of the 1850 U.S. census of the Charleston parish of St. Michael and St. Phillip, White was the legal owner of nine enslaved people, five female, four male, aged two to 36. He lived in town with his wife and six children, aged one to 12, and had real estate valued at US$18,000 (equivalent to $696,600 in 2025). He was on the board of trustees of the College of Charleston in 1851, 1852, 1853, and 1857. On August 6, 1852, Alonzo J. White became the father of twins, a boy, William Moultrie White, and a girl, Louisa Hall White.

On Thursday, March 10, 1853, at 11 a.m., White held an auction at the cobblestoned plaza on the north side of the Charleston Customs House. The product, which had been delivered to Charleston from the Lowcountry on Monday, March 7 by the steamship Col. Myers, was "a very prime gang of NINETY-SIX NEGROS who have been accustomed to the culture of Rice on the Combahee River, until within the last five years they cultivated Sea Island Cotton. These Negros are very orderly and well disciplined and have been long organised and worked as a gang. Among them are Carpenters and a Cooper. They will be offered in families with the exception of a few who are single." Conditions of the sale were "one-third cash. Balance two and three years with interest from date of sale payable annually secured by bonds, mortgage of property sold, and approved personal security." British artist Eyre Crowe, on tour through the United States with the writer William Thackeray, sketched the outdoor auction in between assisting with Thackeray's three-lecture series at the Hibernian Hall. In a history published 1937, historian Frederic Bancroft described the Charleston scene in contrast with the images of a slave sale Crowe had sketched in Virginia:

In contrast with those dark and filthy salesrooms in Richmond, here all was in the balmy air under blue skies. The negroes, dressed in bright, clean, winter clothes, wearing striped, cotton caps or turbans, and crowded on platforms, were very conspicuous against the background of brick walls. Grouped about them were planters, traders and curious on-lookers, wearing long coats, high hats and beards of formal cut, listening to the auctioneer, questioning and inspecting the negroes, exchanging opinions and viewing the familiar but, to them, ever-interesting show. Just then the auctioneer was appealing for higher bids on a buxom negress standing by him on the auction-block and holding her infant. Near the outskirts of the crowd two slave pickaninnies, evidently forgotten for the moment, were crawling about. White's slave porter, a "blacksnake" whip in hand, sat on a horse, watching the gang and waiting to drive to the jail all slaves not taken in charge by their purchasers. On one side was a carefully shielded palmetto, emblem of the State. In the foreground was a howitzer, point down and half embedded like a hitching post. It still impressively marks this truly historic spot.

— Frederic Bancroft, Slave-Trading in the Old South

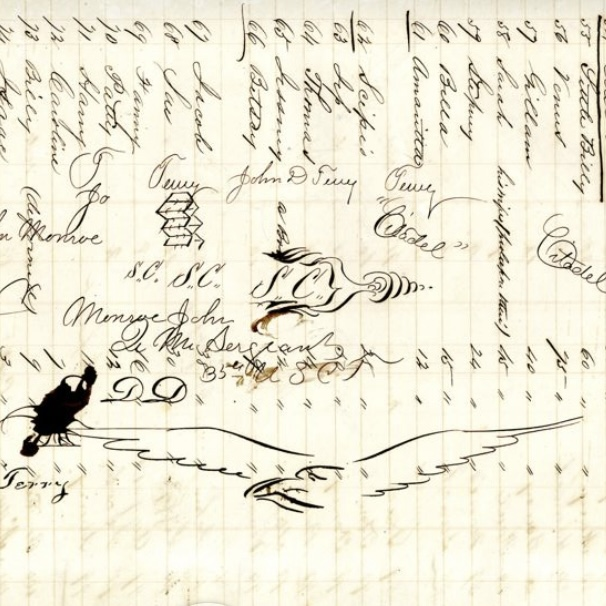
Detail of doodles on page image 14 of the Alonzo J. White account book, which lists hundreds of slaves he offered for auction between 1853 and 1863: The doodles include the signatures of Pvt. John Monroe and Capt. John D. Terry of the U.S. Colored Troops, and what appears to be an American eagle; this page was otherwise the third page of a four-page list of "negroes belonging to" Dr. J. W. Schmidt, who had a plantation in St. Bartholomew's Parish, Colleton District, as well as his "city negroes"

On June 28, 1853, James Blake White recorded that his granddaughter, baby Louisa White, had died at the family home on the corner of Laurens Street and East Bay. In 1853, White began using an account book that listed slaves to be auctioned and continued to record sales in this ledger until 1863. The book is held in the South Carolina Historical Society collection and has been scanned into their Low Country Digital Library. In 1855, one of the people enslaved by the Whites had a baby: "White (formerly Jervey). (Jackson), son of William (servant of Mrs. John Johnson), and of Sary (servant of Mrs. Alonzo J. White, formerly of Wm. Jervey). Born Aug. 14, 1855, was baptized Sept. 21, 1855, in private, being ill." In 1856, along with fellow Charleston slave traders Louis D. DeSaussure and Ziba B. Oakes, White opposed a new South Carolina law requiring that slave sales take place indoors rather than on the streets. Their argument was that the law was "an impolitic admission that would give 'strength to the opponents of slavery' and 'create among some portions of the community a doubt as to the moral right of slavery itself.'" White's father, John Blake White, a respected citizen and apparently a talented artist, died at the age of 79 on August 25, 1859. At the time of the 1860 census, Alonzo J. White was the legal owner of 16 people, ranging in age from two months to 56 years old. Despite his earlier objections to selling slaves indoors, White became one of the Charleston traders who used the building now known as the Old Slave Mart for auctions, such as the January 23, 1860 sale of "Sixty-Five Negroes Accustomed to the Culture of Cotton and Provisions." White continued selling people during the American Civil War, including Old Phillis, Venus and her three children, and Martha and her three children. In 1863 owner-editor R. Barnwell Rhett Jr. considered selling the financially challenged Charleston Mercury newspaper to White but they were unable to agree on terms.

== Later life and death ==
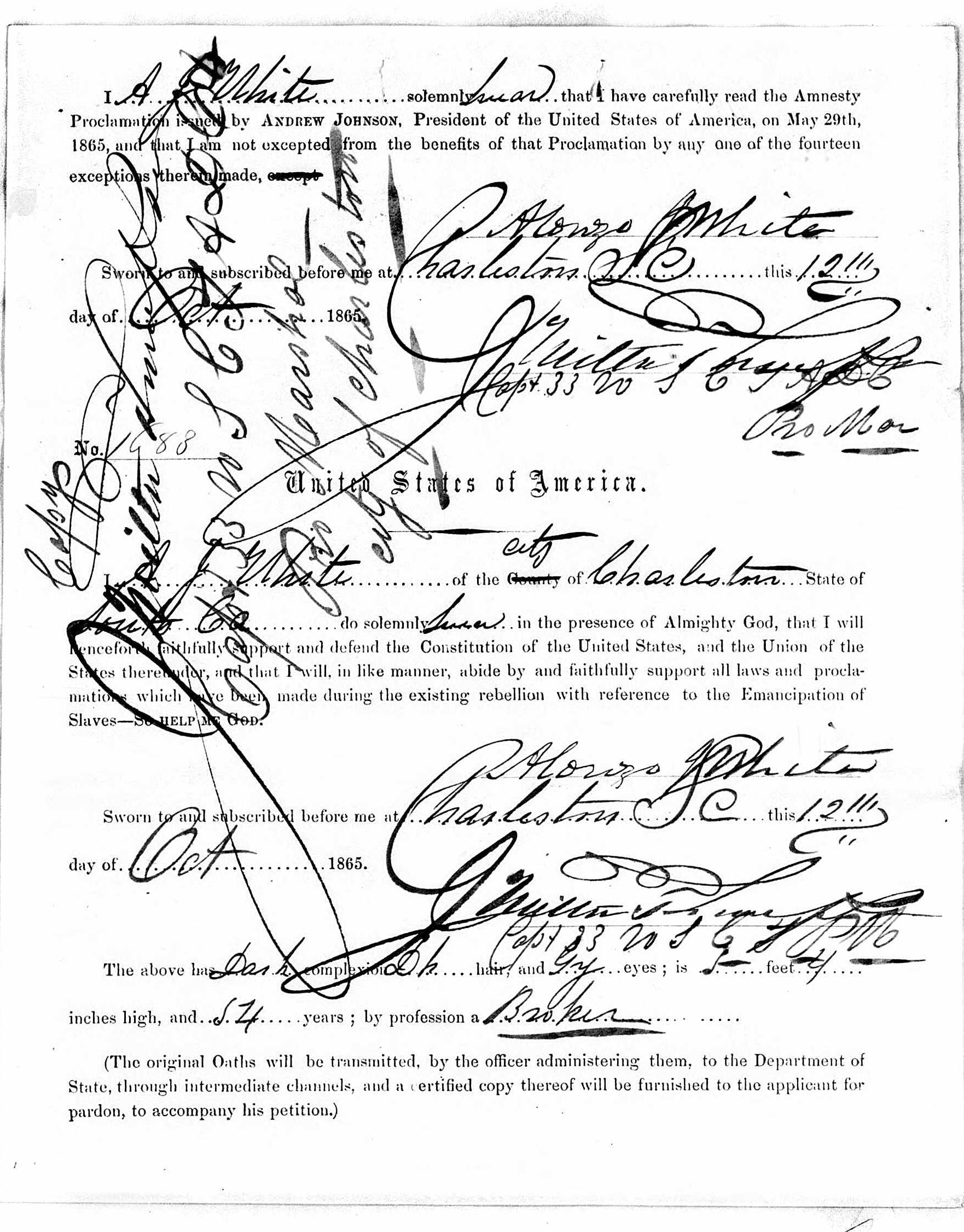
Alonzo J. White oath of allegiance to U.S. Constitution and acknowledgement of emancipation of the formerly enslaved, signed October 12, 1865

After the close of the American Civil War, on October 13, 1865, Alonzo J. White completed the Confederate pardon-amnesty process, including pledging to uphold and defend the U.S. Constitution and agreeing to accept the emancipation of all former slaves, and the U.S. government returned control of the residence at 58 East Bay, Charleston, and other properties, to White. In 1866, White was back to work as a broker but was restricted to selling houses, mills, plantations, and foundries, rather than people. In 1867 a freedman trying to find work for his daughter, who was looking for a first job, presented as a credential that she and her mother had formerly been legally owned by A.J. White. (The young lady was duly hired but quit after four days; her erstwhile employer recorded in a journal: "Diana the 2nd took up her baggage and with her Kind and indulgent Parent returned to her home to enjoy Domestic tranquility & Peace.")

In 1880, White and his son Blake L. White were partners in Alonzo J. White & Son, a firm located at 58 East Bay of "real estate, stock and bond brokers." Another son, Alonzo J. White Jr. was Charleston city sheriff, based at City Hall. When Alonzo J. White died in 1885, his obituary did not mention his past career as a slave trader, which was also the case for several other Charleston "brokers" whose biographies were scrubbed of any connection to the massive interstate slave trade. The cause of death was paralysis. He was buried at Saint Philip's Episcopal Church Cemetery at 146 Church St.

== See also ==
- List of American slave traders
- History of Charleston, South Carolina
- South Carolina Lowcountry
- South Carolina in the American Civil War
