= Red flag (American slavery) =

American slave market signage

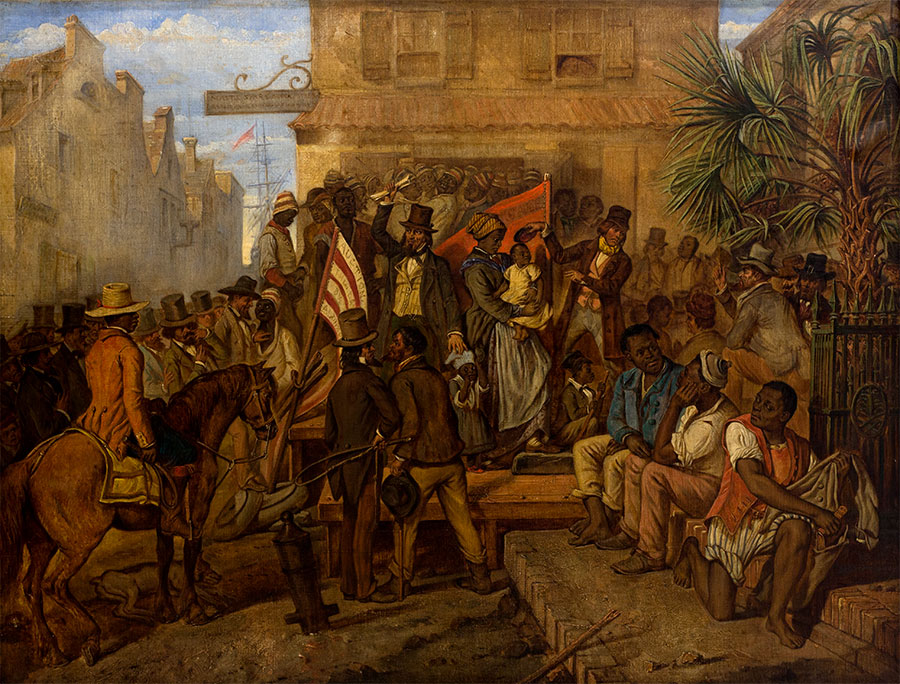
Slave trader Alonzo J. White, in the Eyre Crowe painting Auction at Charleston, is flanked by a striped flag with his name on it, and a red flag (Museo della Belle Artes, Havana).

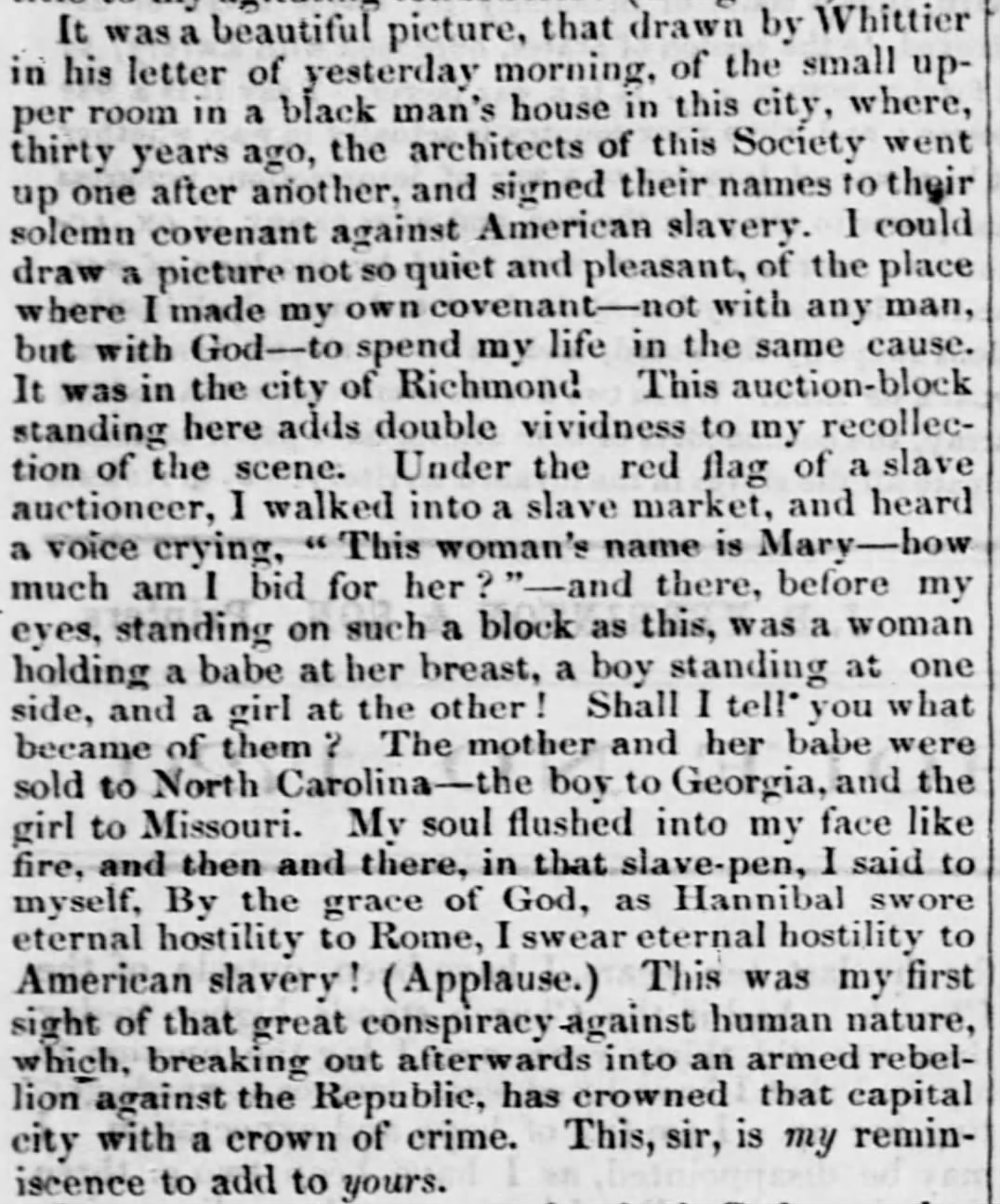
Theodore Tilton's motivation for becoming an abolitionist was witnessing family separation under the red flag at a Richmond slave auction (The Liberator, January 22, 1864).

A red flag was a traditional signal used by slave traders of the United States to indicate that a slave auction was imminent. For instance a British visitor to Richmond, Virginia wrote in 1857, "Yesterday morning, I went down the street in which the hotel is situated, to two dirty-looking empty rooms, except for a few forms, and a stone block; from their doors hung out red flags, on which were affixed notices that so many negroes would be sold at ten o'clock."

In 1861, Richmond slave trader Hector Davis paid $16.95 for a secession flag to fly outside his business; according to historian Robert Colby, "This was only the first of many gestures he made signaling his support for the fledgling Confederacy...Day by day, his secession flag flew alongside the red cloth square that signified an impending sale of slaves, the twin standards of the new Confederacy." Among the items looted by Charles Carleton Coffin from Ziba Oakes' slave jail in 1865 was a red slave-sale flag. According to the Museum of African American History, "Red flags outside slave sites signaled that enslaved people were 'ready for sale' and often had an inventory of the enslaved attached. Sometimes enslaved children were sent through the streets carrying the red flag and ringing a bell to announce a slave sale."

In an 1850 speech before New England Anti-Slavery Society, C. C. Burleigh painted an image of an injustice being done "under the blended shadows of the red auction flag and the stripes of the Republic". When Maryland passed the abolition of slavery in 1864, The Liberator reprinted an editorial from the Cincinnati Catholic Telegraph, that referred to both the red flag and the symbols on the flag of Maryland: "We rejoice that Maryland, the cradle of the Catholic Faith in the United States, is now untarnished with slavery...and that the Cross, the true sign of liberty, more so than any banner that ever waved on earth, will no longer be insulted by looking down on the red flag of the auctioneer where men and women are offered for sale to the highest bidder."

== See also ==
- Slave markets and slave jails in the United States
- Slave trade in the United States
- Secession badge
- Flags of the Confederate States of America
