= James Jervey =

American lawyer, banker, slave trader (1785–1845)

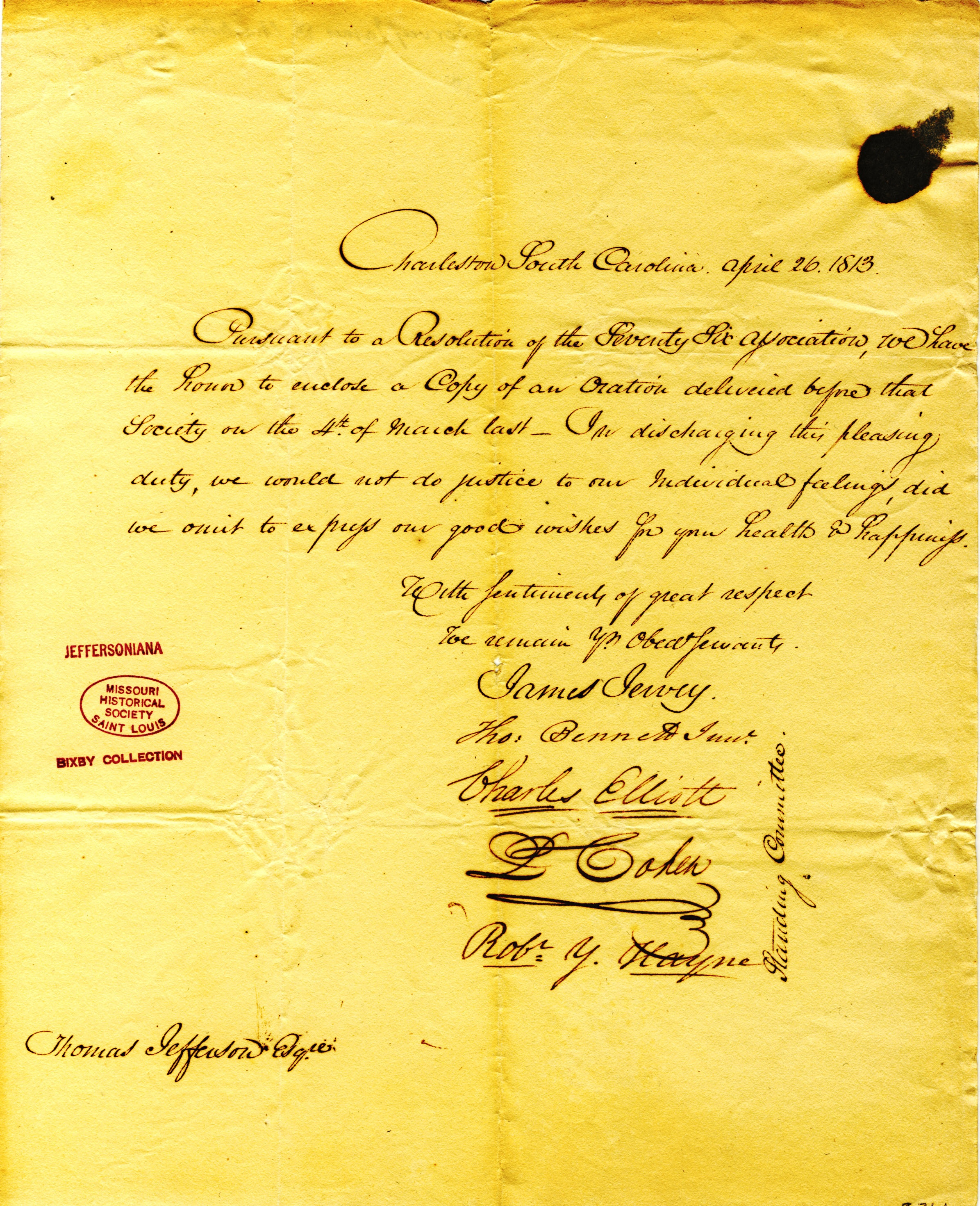
- James Jervey signature on an 1813 message to Thomas Jefferson

President of the State Bank of Charleston
- In office 1839–1845

Personal details
- Born: 7 September 1784 South Carolina, U.S.
- Died: 2 April 1845 (aged 60) Charleston, South Carolina, U.S.
- Resting place: St. Michael's Churchyard, Charleston, South Carolina, U.S.
- Children: 8
- Education: College of Charleston
- Occupation: Lawyer, banker, slave trader
- Known for: largest auction of enslaved people in U.S. history

James Jervey (7 September 1784 – 2 April 1845) was an American slave trader, lawyer, and banker who lived in worked in Charleston, South Carolina, where he co-owned the slave-trading firm of Jervey, Waring & White.

== Early life, family, and education ==
James Jervey was born on 7 September 1784, in South Carolina to parents Capt. Thomas Jervey and Grace Hall. He married Mary Postell in 1806 and they would have 8 children together.

He attended the College of Charleston. In 1805, Jervey was admitted to the bar after passing the South Carolina Bar. The artist Charles Fraser painted his portrait in miniature in 1818.

== Career ==
He worked as a law clerk at the United States District Court of South Carolina. He was member of a committee petitioning for a railroad from Charleston to Augusta, Georgia in 1827. In 1832 he served as president of the South Carolina Society and the Orphans Home. He began an association with the State Bank of Charleston in the 1810s and later served as bank president, from 1839 to 1845.

It was during his time as a lawyer that he operated the slave-trading firm of Jervey, Waring & White, a partnership with Morton A. Waring and Alonzo J. White, which proved to be less profitable as the nineteenth century progressed.

== Later life and legacy ==
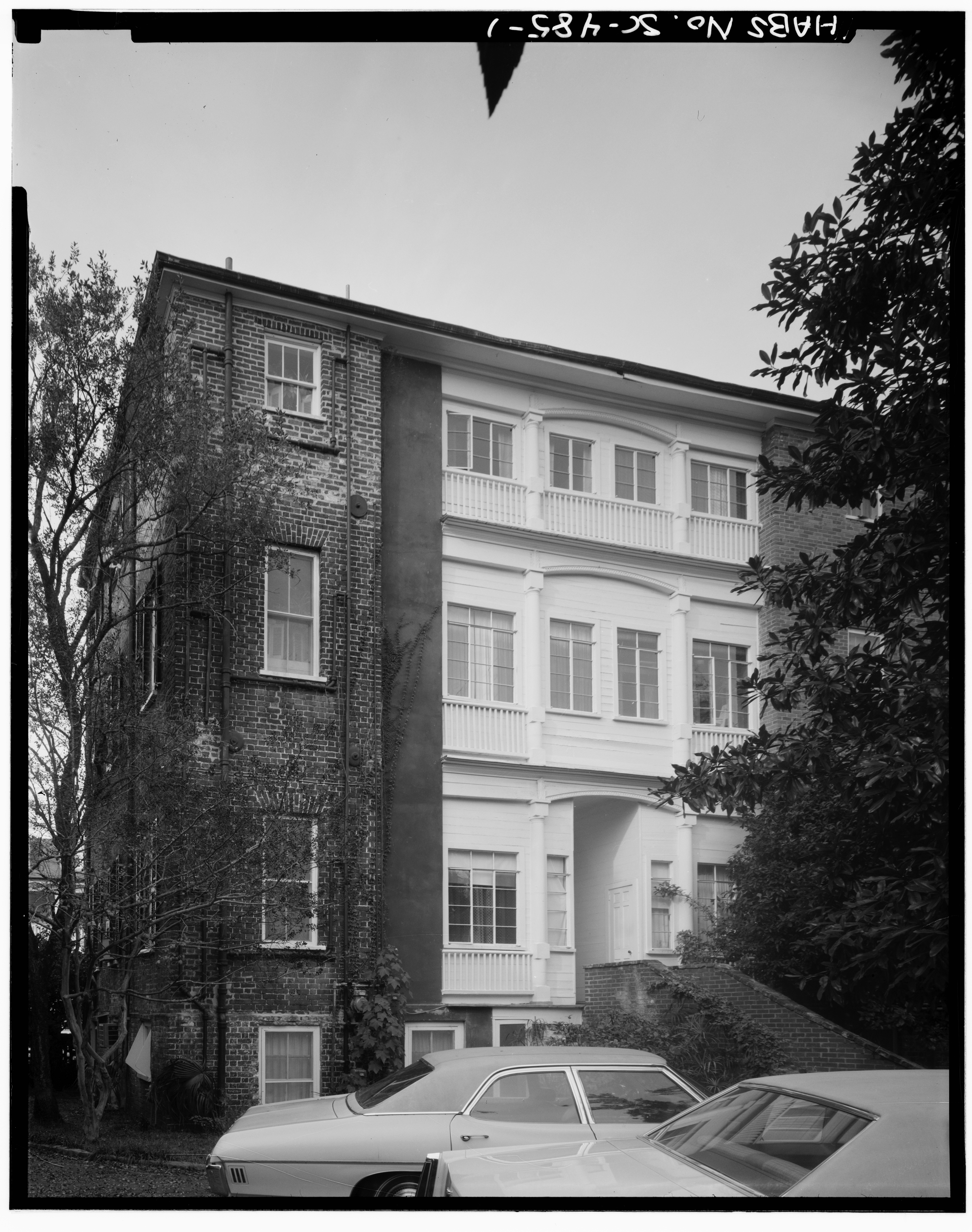
James Jervey House, 55 Laurens in Charleston, photographed 1970s for HABS

Jervey died at age 60 on 2 April 1845, in Charleston. His obituary in the Charleston Courier dated Friday, April 4, 1845 reads as follows, "he mortal remains of James Jervey, Esq., were interred, yesterday, in the cemetery of St. Michael's Church, the regrets of our whole community mingling with those of his bereaved and mourning family, at the loss of such a worthy citizen and estimable man. He had been laboring, for some time, under bodily indisposition, and expired on Wednesday last, having fulfilled the age of three score years. Mr. Jervey was a man of intelligent mind, and benevolent disposition, remarkable for the courtesy and urbanity of his manners, and beloved and esteemed by all who knew him. His life was one of honorable and active usefulness, distinguished by fidelity in the discharge of all private and social responsibilities. He was the depositary of many private and public trusts. For a number of years he was Clerk of the Federal Courts in this State, and was looked up to as an oracle in the practice of those tribunals. As Chairman of the Commissioners of the Orphan House, he served for about ten years, and carefully administered the affairs of that noble charity; and, for perhaps an equally extended period, he further promoted the cause of benevolence, as Steward or presiding officer of the South Carolina Society. He retired from his Clerkship, on his election to the office of President of the State Bank of this city, which he continued to fill with ability and integrity to the day of his death. In addition to his numerous secular trusts, the case of the interests of religion, in a measure, devolved on him, as chairman of the Vestry of St. Michael's Church. We held him in high estimation during his life, and record our tribute to his memory now that he is numbered with the dead."

== See also ==
- South Carolina Canal and Railroad Company
