= Great Slave Auction =

1859 record-setting slave auction in the US

Coordinates: 32°05′06″N 81°07′48″W

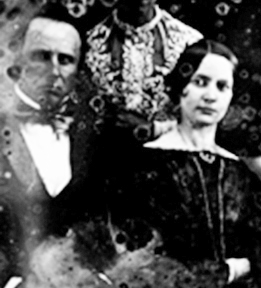
Pierce Mease Butler, whose slaves were sold in the auction, and his wife, Frances Kemble Butler

The Great Slave Auction (also called the Weeping Time) was an auction of enslaved Americans of African descent held at Ten Broeck Race Course, near Savannah, Georgia, United States, on March 2 and 3, 1859. Slaveholder and absentee plantation owner Pierce Mease Butler authorized the sale of approximately 436 men, women, children, and infants to be sold over the course of two days. The sale's proceeds went to satisfy Butler's significant debt, much from gambling. The auction was considered the largest single sale of slaves in U.S. history until the 2022 discovery of an even larger auction of over 600 slaves in Charleston, South Carolina.

== Background ==
The Butlers of South Carolina and Philadelphia were owners of slave plantations located on Butler Island (Butler Island Plantation) and St. Simons Island, just south of Darien, Georgia. The patriarch of the family, Major Pierce Butler (1744–1822), owned hundreds of slaves who labored over rice and cotton crops, thus amassing for him the family's wealth. Butler was among the wealthiest and most powerful enslavers in the United States. Major Pearce was estranged from his son, so upon his death he left his estate to his two grandsons, Pierce Mease Butler and John A. Mease Butler.

Pierce Mease Butler frequently engaged in risky business speculation, resulting in financial loss in the Panic of 1857. His extravagant spending deepened his debt. Butler had also accrued a considerable amount of gambling debt over the years. To satisfy his financial obligations, Butler's estate was transferred to trustees. At first, the trustees sold Butler's Philadelphia mansion for $30,000; they sold other property, but the proceeds were insufficient to satisfy Butler's creditors. The only commodities of value that remained were the slaves he owned on his Georgia plantations.

== Auction ==
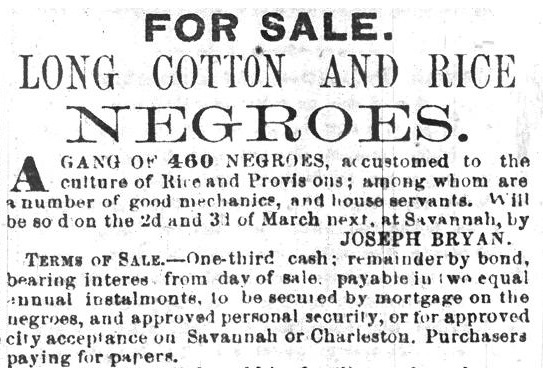
Advertisement in the Savannah Republican

Savannah was chosen for the auction due to its proximity to the Butler estate and its status as a large center for slave trading. Pierce Butler had the impending sale advertised in The Savannah Republican and The Savannah Daily Morning News by Joseph Bryan, a slave dealer in Savannah, and a son of former Georgia congressman Joseph Bryan. The advertisements ran daily, except on Sundays, up until the last day of the sale. The text of some of the advertisements was, "For Sale, Long Cotton and Rice Negros. A gang of 460 negroes, accustomed to the culture of rice and provisions, among them are a number of good mechanics and house servants, will be sold on the 2d and 3d March next, at Savannah, by J. Bryan." It was advertised and announced from the beginning that there would be no division of families. The slaves were brought to the race track four days before the auction started, allowing buyers and inspectors to take a look at them. On the first sale day, there were about 200 buyers present. Fierce rains kept many potential buyers away, and the auction began two hours late. During the day of the sale, Joseph Bryan was in charge of feeding the slaves and keeping them in "good" condition. The slaves were kept in the horse barn stalls. All family members were put in the same stall, which had hardwood floors and nothing to sit on. The slaves were given small portions of rice, beans, and sometimes cornbread to eat over the two days. Skin color often played a role in the price a slave would sell for, but in this sale it was not a factor since almost all of these slaves were dark-skinned. Some slaves were skilled in crafts such as shoemaking, cooperage, blacksmithing, carpentry, and machinery. The skilled slaves were sold for more and were sought by the buyers during the auction.

=== Slaves ===
The slaves were taken to Savannah by steamboat and train and housed in the racecourse stables. They huddled together, eating and sleeping on the floor. From February 26 until March 1, the slaves were inspected by prospective buyers. Customers from Virginia, North and South Carolina, Georgia, Alabama, Mississippi and Louisiana descended upon Savannah in hopes of getting good deals. It was known that the Butler plantations had slaves who were skilled in shoemaking, cooperage, blacksmithing, carpentry, and machine operation. The buyers poked, pinched, and fondled the slaves, opening their mouths to inspect their teeth. Slaves were also examined for ruptures or defects on their bodies that might affect their productivity.

Four hundred thirty-six people were advertised in the catalog, but only four hundred twenty-nine were sold. Those not sold were either ill or disabled. Most sold were rice and cotton field workers; others were skilled coopers, carpenters, shoemakers, blacksmiths, and cooks. The two-day sale netted $303,850 (equivalent to $10,887,958 in 2025). The highest bid for a family, a mother and her five grown children, was $6,180 (equivalent to $221,450 in 2025). Prices for an individual ranged from $250 to $1,750 (equivalent to $8,958 and $62,708 in 2025).

== Aftermath and legacy ==
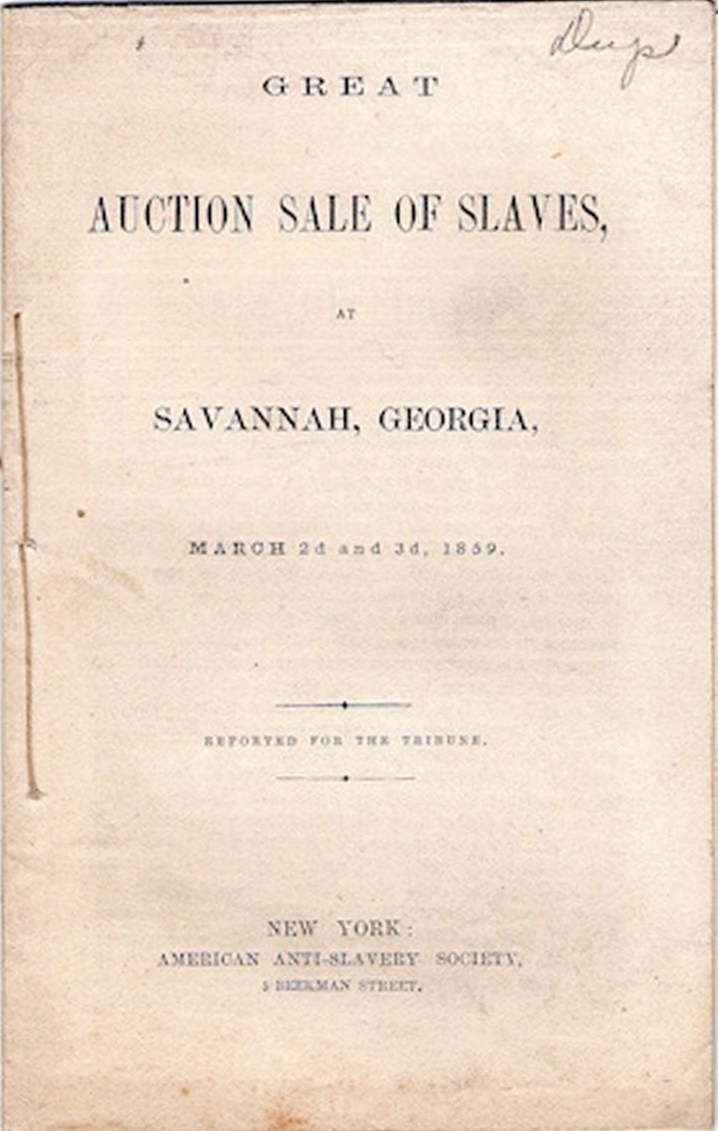
Pamphlet on the slave auction, published by the American Anti-Slavery Society in 1859

Mortimer Thomson (who wrote under the pseudonym "Q. K. Philander Doesticks"), a popular journalist during the time, memorialized the event. Initially, Thomson traveled to Savannah, infiltrating the buyers by pretending to be interested in purchasing slaves. After the sale, he wrote a long and scathing article describing the auction in the New York Tribune titled, "What Became of the Slaves on a Georgia Plantation."

Tom Pate, a Vicksburg trader, bought a man, his wife, and his two sisters at the sale with the guarantee that they were not to be separated under the auction terms. Disregarding the agreement, Pate sold one sister to Pat Somers, a fellow trader, and the other sister to a private citizen in St. Louis. Somers, finding out later about the sales agreement in Savannah about the families not being separated, returned the girl to Pate, demanding his money be refunded. An argument ensued, resulting in Somers being shot and killed. Ten days following Somers's death, his nephew killed Pate, and he himself was killed during the confrontation. The family feud continued after this, with several further deaths.

After the slaves were freed by the Emancipation Proclamation and the Confederate States' defeat, some returned to Butler Island to work for wages, and some bought land in the area.

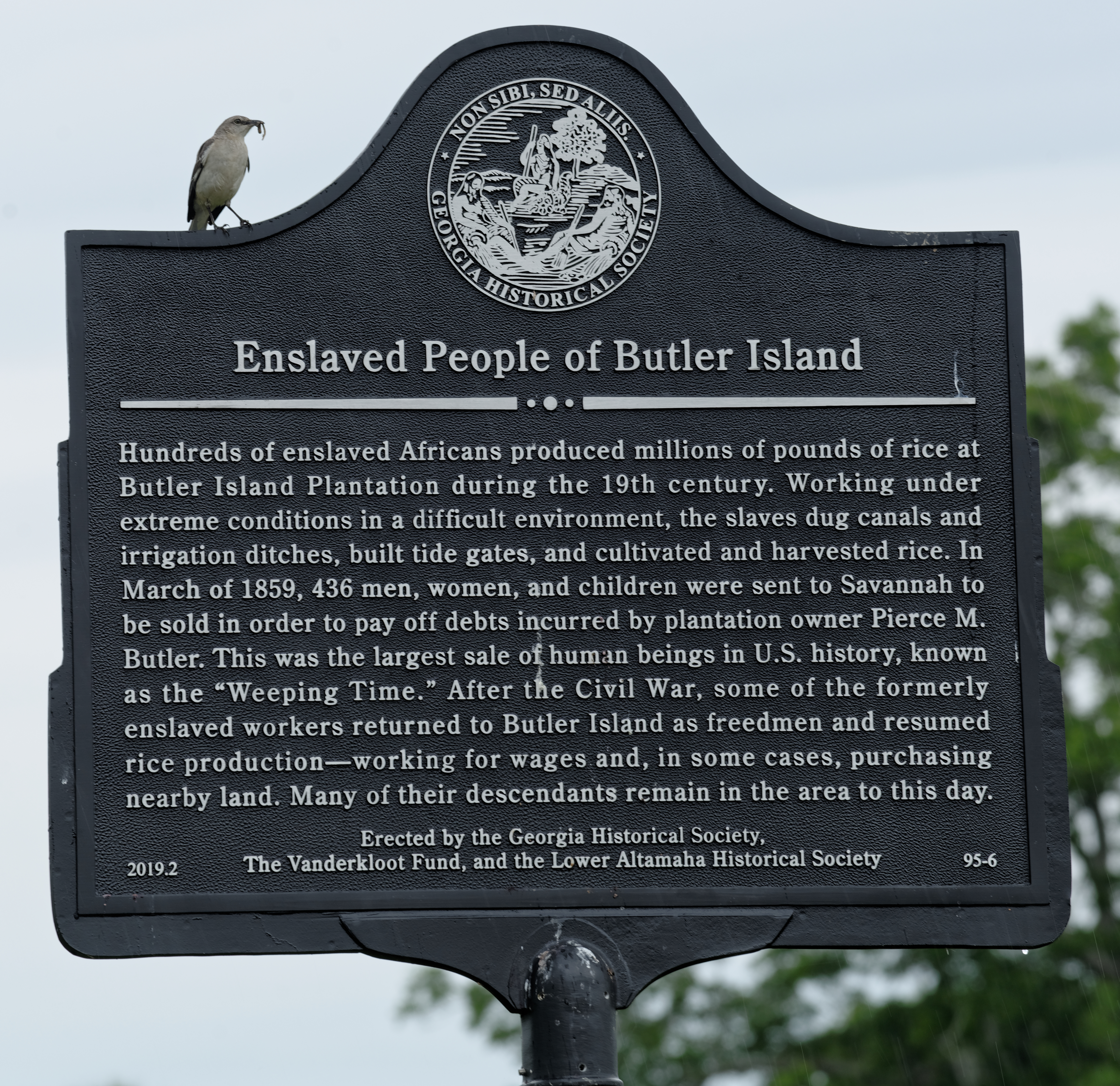
Historical marker on Butler Island

Two Georgia historical markers are dedicated to the event. One is at 2053 Augusta Avenue in Savannah, Georgia, erected by the city and the Georgia Historical Society in 2008. The other is at Butler Plantation, erected by the Georgia Historical Society in 2019.

== See also ==
- 1838 Jesuit slave sale
- List of largest slave sales in the United States
