= Louis DeSaussure House =

Antebellum house in South Carolina

Coordinates: 32.770290°N 79.928682°W

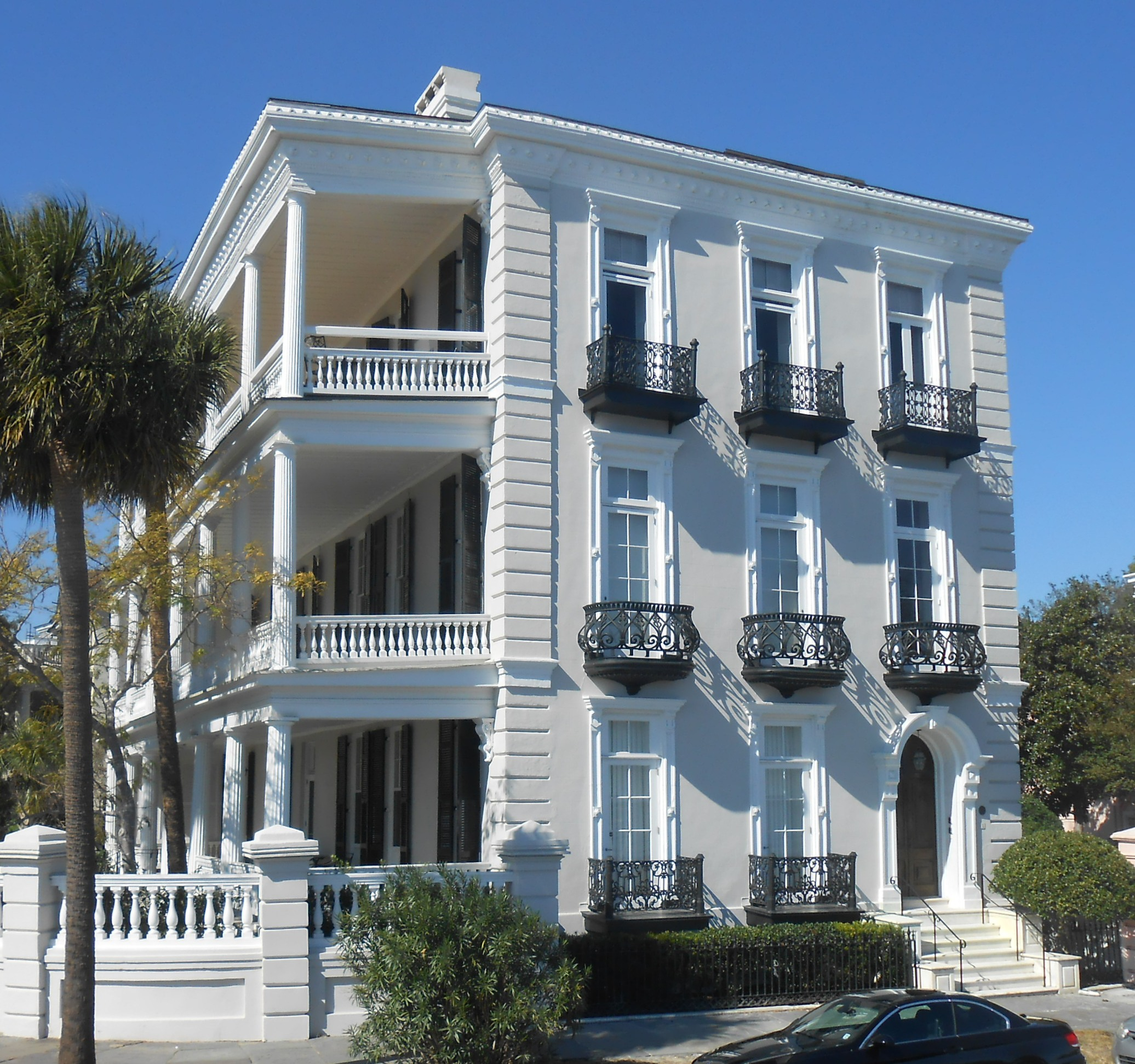
The Louis DeSaussure House, 1 East Battery, Charleston, South Carolina

The Louis DeSaussure House is an antebellum house at 1 East Battery, Charleston, South Carolina. The house was designed and built for Louis DeSaussure by William Jones and completed in late 1859 (166 years ago). The three-story, masonry house follows a traditional side hall plan; two adjacent parlors are fronted with piazzas along the south side while a stair hall runs along the north side with a front door facing east onto East Battery. In 1865 during the Civil War, the house was damaged when evacuating Confederate forces blew up a large cannon at the corner of East Battery and South Battery; a piece of the cannon was lodged in the attic of the house. The balconies on the East Battery façade and window ornaments were installed when the house was restored after the earthquake of 1886 by Bernard O'Neill, who bought it in 1888. The house was used by the military to house Navy officers during World War II and was later converted into apartments. The carriage house for 1 East Battery was later subdivided into a separate house known as 2 South Battery.
