= Ziba B. Oakes =

American slave trader (1807–1871)

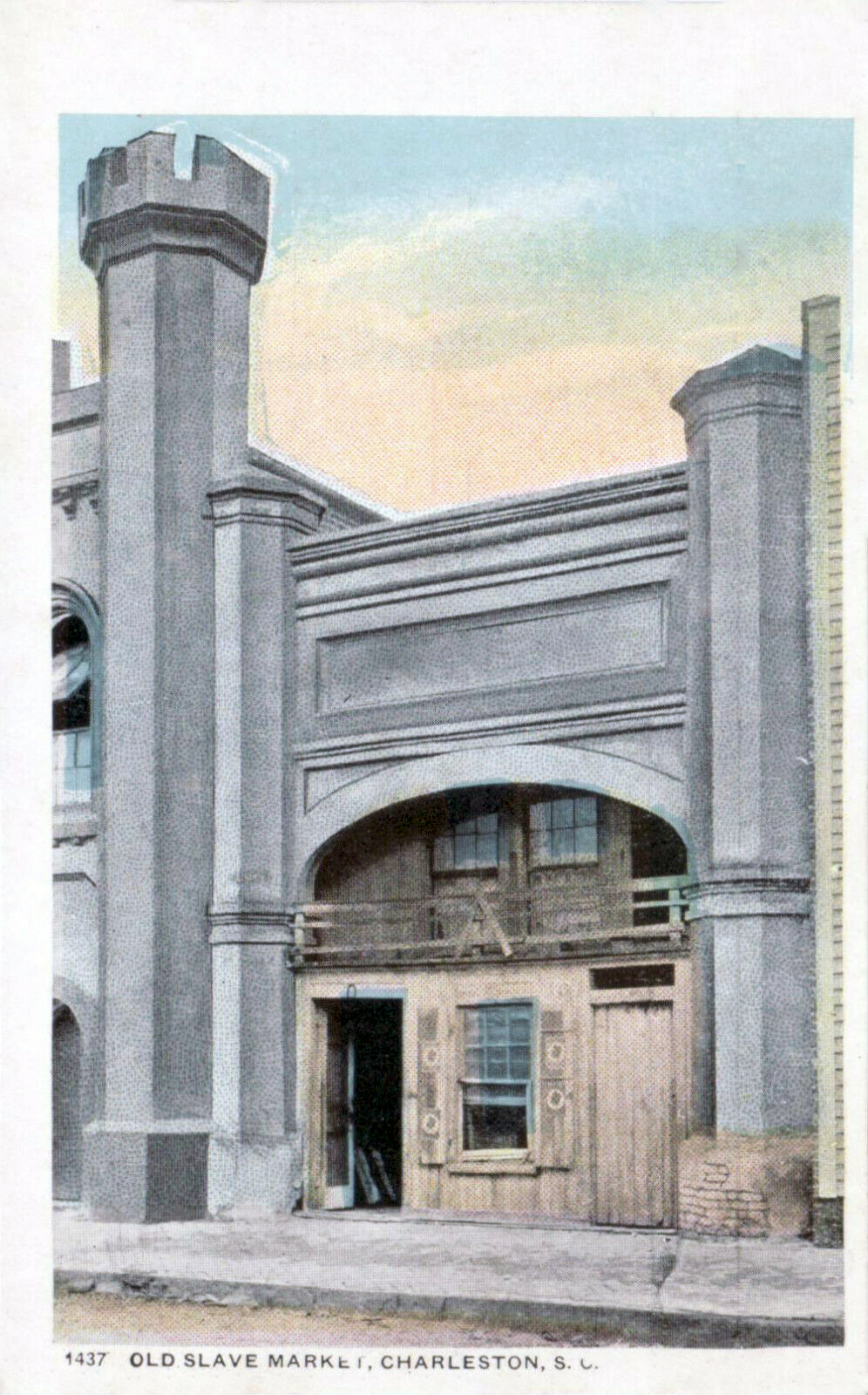
Early 20th-century postcard of the Old Slave Mart, 6 Chalmers Street

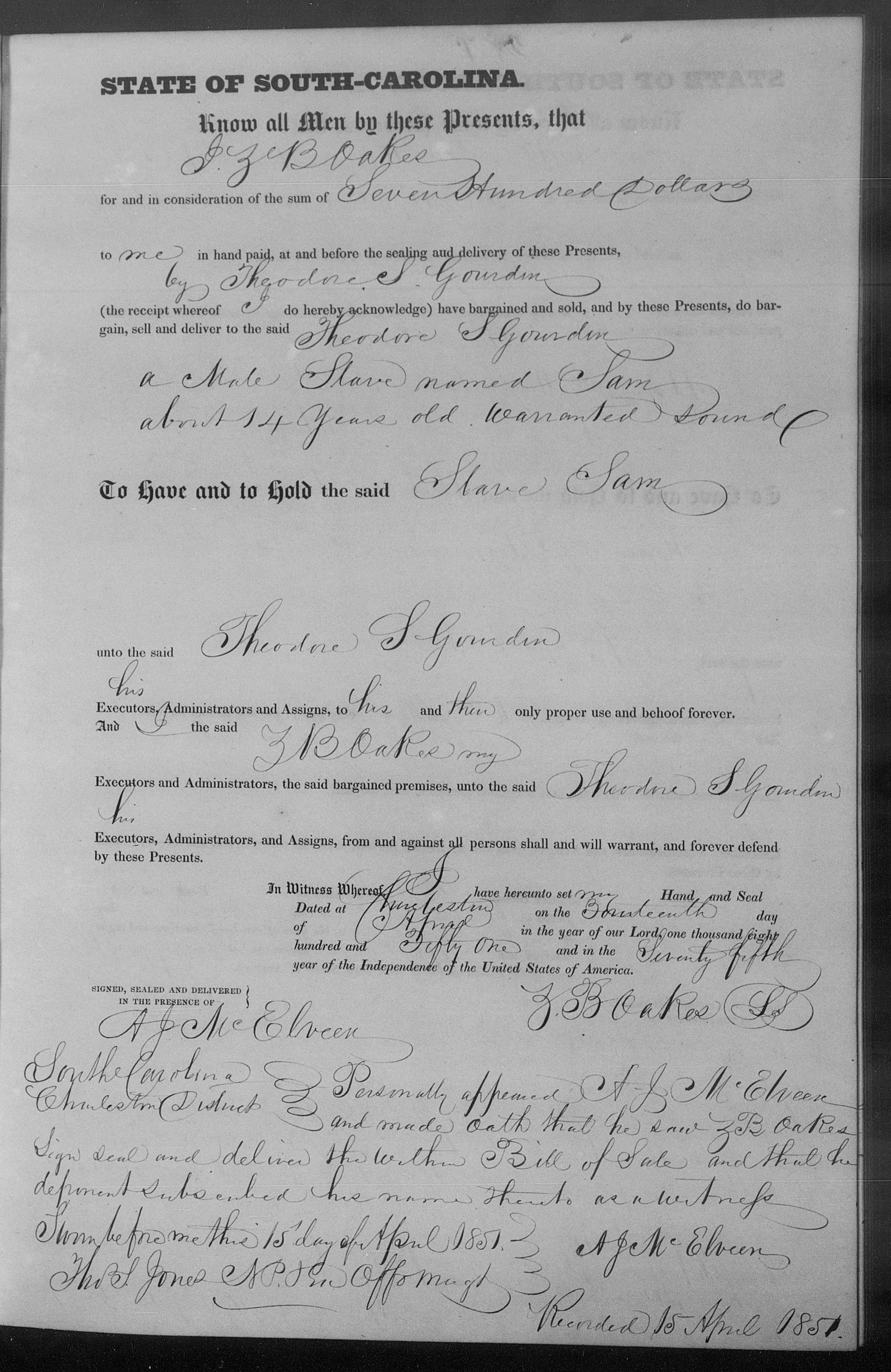
Sold for $700 by Z.B. Oakes to Theodore S. Gourdin: "...a Male Slave named Sam about 14 Years Old warranted sound...in the Seventy-fifth year of the Independence of the United States of America"

Ziba Burrill Oakes (1807 – May 25, 1871) was a broker of slaves and real estate in Charleston, South Carolina. Oakes is significant in the history of American slavery in part due to his construction of what he called a "shed" at 6 Chalmers Street. The shed still stands and is now Charleston's Old Slave Mart Museum. The site as a whole, once a much larger assemblage of buildings and pens, was generally known as Ryan's mart or Ryan's nigger-jail, and shut down in late 1864 or early 1865, supposedly "when owners Thomas Ryan and Z.B. Oakes went off to fight in the war." Come the end of the American Civil War, writer and abolitionist James Redpath took it upon himself to visit Charleston's negro mart and liberate the slavery-related business documents that remained therein. The 652 letters to Z.B. Oakes looted by Redpath were eventually turned over to abolitionist William Lloyd Garrison and in 1891 became a part of the anti-slavery special collections at the Boston Public Library. The letters remain a significant primary source in the study of the 19th-century American slave trade.

== Life and work ==
=== Early years ===
Oakes was a Yankee by extraction, born in Sangerville, Maine, to a colonial-era family with roots in Massachusetts and the District of Maine. Per a genealogy by historian Henry Lebbeus Oak (workshop of Hubert Howe Bancroft), Ziba Oakes was one of three children born to a prosperous merchant named Samuel Oakes (1784–1845) and his wife Mary Burrill (1787–1880), daughter of Ziba Burrill. In about 1817 Samuel Oakes moved from the family from Maine to South Carolina for reasons unknown; the northern branches of the family were left with no notion of "what induced him to settle in the South."

According to a newspaper article published at the time of his death, Ziba Oakes arrived in Charleston when he was 10 years old and was "educated at the school of the late Bishop England. His first connection with business was as a clerk with his father, who kept a store at the corner of Church and Market streets, to which, in due course of time, Mr. Oakes, the subject of the sketch, succeeded as proprietor." Circa 1823, Samuel Oakes advertised the newly opened Milton's ferry from Fitzsimons' Wharf to Christchurch in Georgetown, as well as an accompanying ferry tavern.

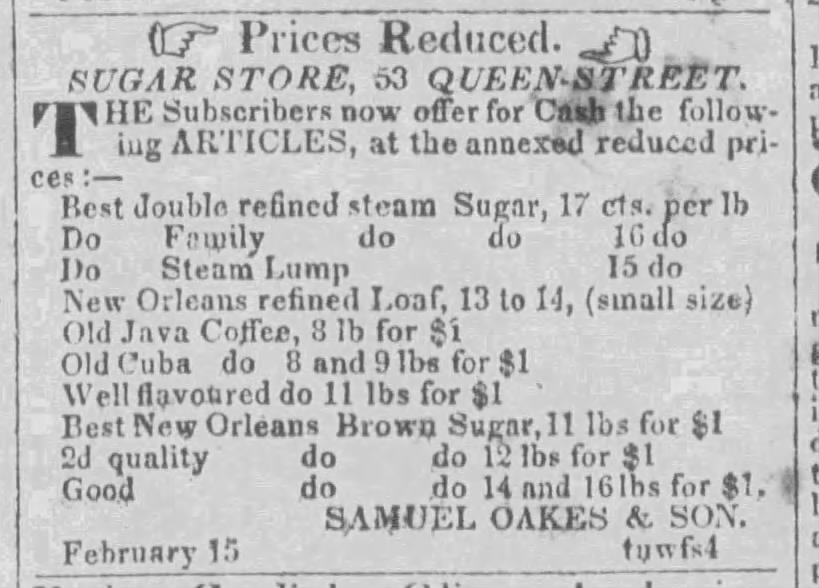
In 1831 Samuel Oakes & Son co-operated the Sugar Store located at 53 Queen Street

Around 1826, Samuel Oakes bought, from Mr. N. Very, a grocery that specialized in sugar, coffee, tea and chocolate. Circa 1827, when he about 20 years old, "Z.T. Oakes" applied for a license to "retail Spirituous Liquors" at the establishment of Samuel Oakes located at 117 Broad. On February 24, 1831, Ziba Oakes married Margaret Christie (1813–1886). In 1833 Samuel Oakes & Son advertised five cases of "satin beaver hats" newly arrived on the barque Chief, as "fashionable, waterproof, and warranted to retain their color...for sale, low." On October 1, 1834, father Samuel Oakes and son Z.B. Oakes dissolved their legal partnership. Also in 1834, Oakes was the manager of the election of officers for the Marion Riflemen, Second Battalion, 16th Regiment Infantry, South Carolina Militia, which was assigned to a beat along the Cooper River. Oakes sold a "mulatto slave named Richard" for $500 (~$15,605 in 2025) in December 1835.

=== Trading career ===
On February 6, 1843, Oakes placed a notice in the Charleston Daily Courier formally announcing a new business enterprise opening on State Street: "The Subscriber respectfully informs his friends and the public that he has commenced the BROKERAGE AUCTION and COMMISSION BUSINESS at No 7 State-street. He will attend to the purchase and sale of Real Estate, Negroes, Stocks &c; and hopes by proper attention to business to merit a share of public patronage Liberal advances at all times made on property placed in his possession for sale. Z. B. Oakes." According to Michael Tadman, Oakes "specialised in selling slaves to long-distance traders...Ziba Oakes's trading arrangements relied essentially upon a quick turn-over of capital." In exchange for being able to rapidly assemble a shipping lot of enslaved people, Oakes' trading partners were apparently willing to pay a slight premium.

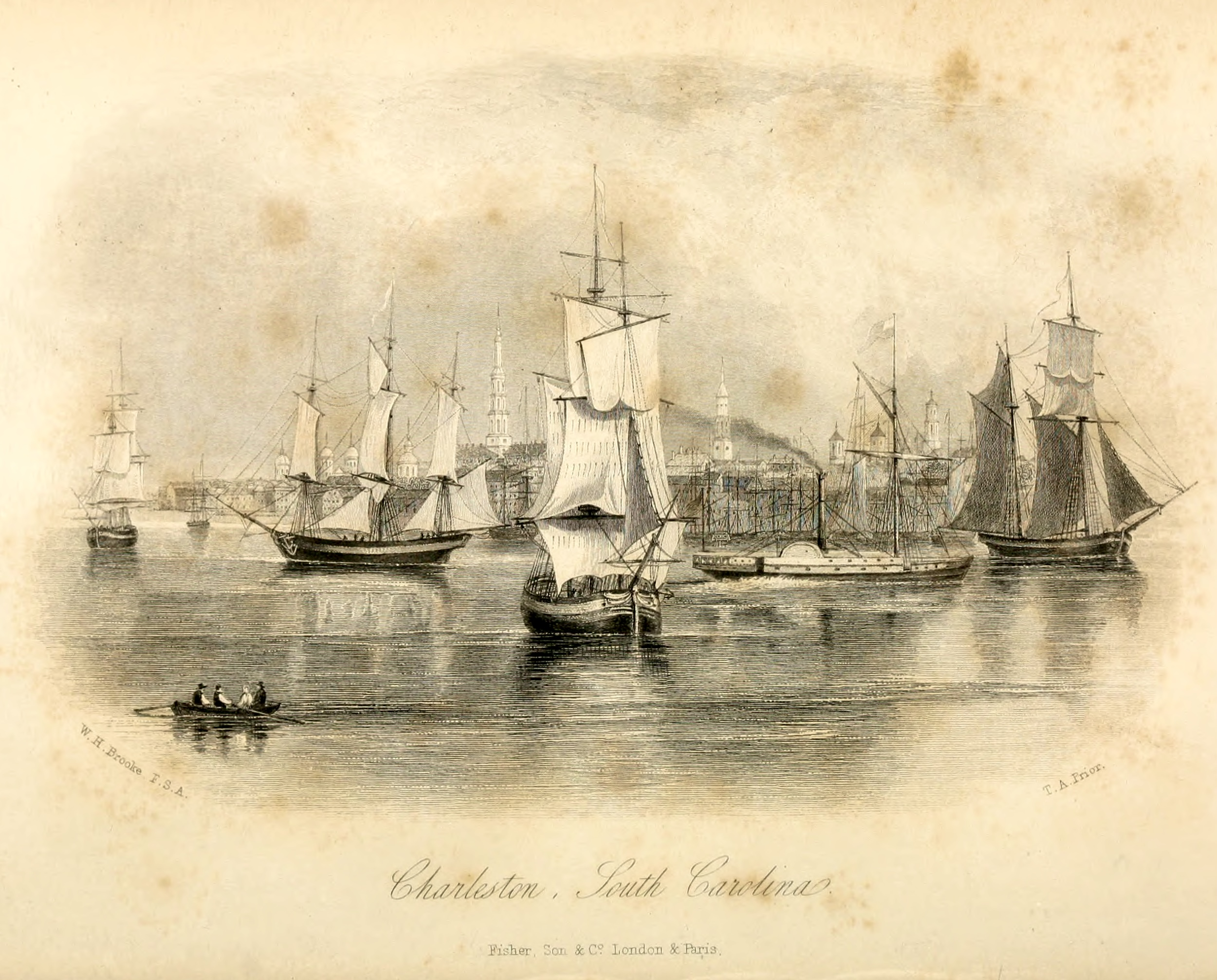
Harbor of Charleston, South Carolina by William Henry Brooke from The Slave States of America (1842) by James Silk Buckingham

In 1844, the father, Samuel Oakes, was implicated in a case of illegally importing four people across state lines into Georgia, which at that time prohibited interstate slave trading (the prohibition was repealed in 1856).

In 1850 Z.B. Oakes shared a home with his mother, his wife (the former Margaret Garaux Christie), and their four daughters; his occupation was broker. Broker, rather than trader or slave trader, was the term commonly used in Charleston to describe slave traders. Like a dozen other Charleston slave traders, he initially had his offices on State Street. In December 1850, Z.B. Oakes, formerly of the Sugar Store, and now broker and auctioneer at 7 State street offered, "CONFECTIONER AT PRIVATE SALE A very intelligent FELLOW a complete Confectioner probably the best of his color in the State. Apply to Z. B. OAKES." Oakes was one of about 50 known slave traders operating in Charleston in the 1850s.

According to Frederic Bancroft, Oakes was no more than a mid-level trader in the Charleston slavery economy. In 1856, along with fellow slave traders Louis D. DeSaussure and Alonzo J. White, he opposed a new South Carolina law requiring that slave sales take place indoors rather than on the streets. Their argument was that the law was "an impolitic admission that would give 'strength to the opponents of slavery' and 'create among some portions of the community a doubt as to the moral right of slavery itself.'" Still, he became a prominent citizen and as of 1855 he was "an officer in the Most Worshipful Grand Lodge of Free Masons of South Carolina, serving on several committees, including the Charity Committee. In the same year, he was a Companion and the Grand Treasurer of the Grand Royal Arch Chapter of South Carolina Masons."

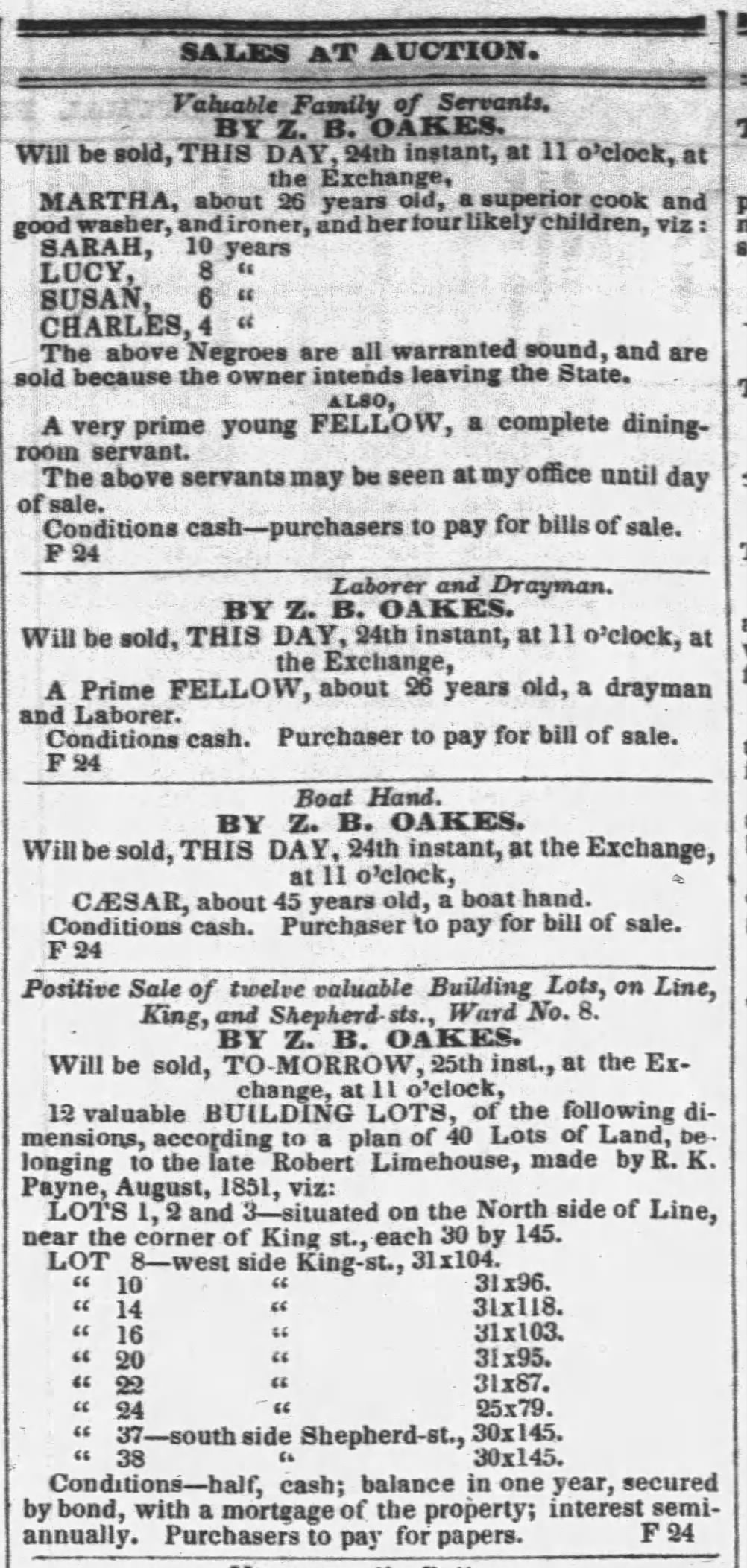
Newspaper advertisements placed by Z. B. Oakes listing slaves and land for sale (Charleston Daily Courier, February 24, 1852)

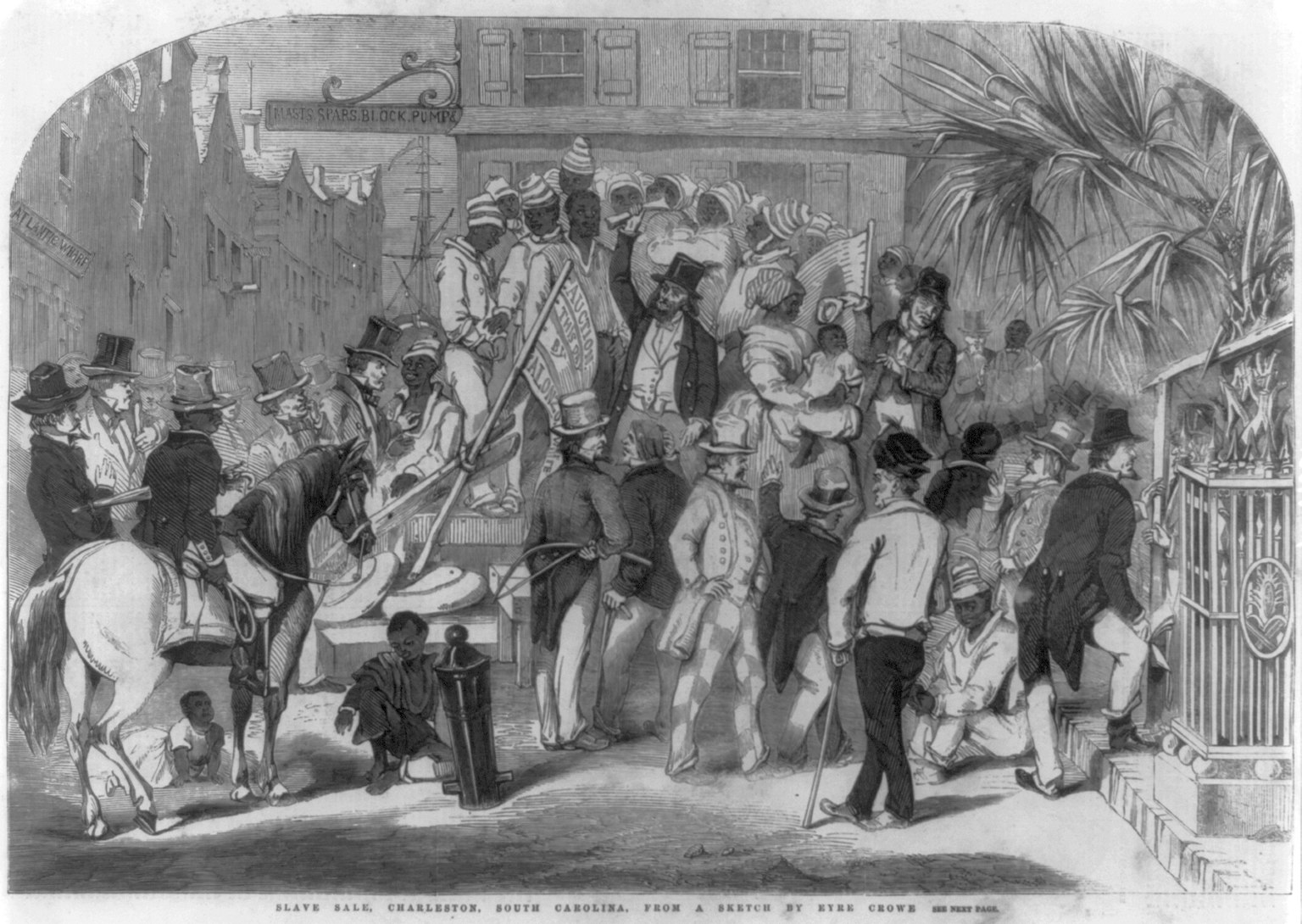
Between 1849 and 1856, Charleston slave auctions, like this one organized by Alonzo J. White, were often held in the streets (Eyre Crowe, London Illustrated News, 1856)

A 2020 biography claimed that by 1860 Oakes "was the most prosperous of Charleston's approximately 40 slave traders." In 1860, on the eve of the American civil war, his occupation was again listed as broker, and he owned real estate valued at US$42,000 (equivalent to $1,505,000 in 2025), and he had a personal estate valued at US$50,000 (equivalent to $1,791,667 in 2025). In the 1861 Charleston city directory, Z.B. Oakes lived at 59 Beaufain, and his slave mart was located at 7 and 9 Chalmers.

In May 1862, the Charleston Mercury apprised its readership of the current state of the local market in human beings: "SALE OF NEGROS—Mr. Z. B. Oakes, broker, at private sale, a gang of thirty negroes for $17,500, an average of $583.33." If Oakes took the standard 2.5 percent broker commission his share of the US$17,500 (equivalent to $564,375 in 2025) would have been US$437.50 (equivalent to $14,109 in 2025). Oakes was listing slaves for sale as late as November 1864: "A GANG OF 75 NEGROES accustomed to the culture of Rice, Cotton and Provisions. Amongst them are a capable and Intelligent Driver and a good Carpenter. These Negroes have worked together as a gang for many years and are orderly and efficient." Oakes' last known advertisement for an enslaved person appeared in the Charleston Mercury of November 9, 1864: "A likely young man, a superior cook in all branches of the trade, apply as above." Oakes served in the Confederate States Army as a private in Company C of the 1st Regiment, South Carolina Militia (Charleston Reserves).

=== Post-bellum and later life ===
In February 1865, journalist Charles Carleton Coffin visited the mart:

I entered the Theological Library building through a window from which General Gillmore had removed the sash by a solid shot. A pile of old rubbish lay upon the floor, — sermons, tracts, magazines, books, papers, musty and mouldy, turning into pulp beneath the rain-drops which came down through the shattered roof. ¶ Amid these surroundings was the Slave-Mart, — a building with a large iron gate in front, above which, in large gilt letters, was the word MART. The outer iron gate opened into a hall about sixty feet long by twenty broad, flanked on one side by a long table running the entire length of the hall, and on the other by benches. At the farther end a door, opening through a brick wall, gave entrance to a yard. The door was locked. I tried my boot-heel, but it would not yield. I called a freedman to my aid. Unitedly we took up a great stone, and gave a blow. Another, and the door of the Bastile went into splinters. Across the yard was a four-story brick building, with grated windows and iron doors, — a prison. The yard was walled by high buildings. He who entered there left all hope behind. A small room adjoining the hall was the place where women were subjected to the lascivious gaze of brutal men. There were the steps, up which thousands of men, women, and children had walked to their places on the table, to be knocked off to the highest bidder...While there a colored woman came into the hall to see the two Yankees. ¶ "I was sold there upon that table two years ago," said she. "You never will be sold again; you are free now and forever," I replied. "Thank God! the blessed Jesus, he has heard my prayer. I am so glad; only I wish I could see my husband. He was sold at the same time into the country, and has gone I don't know where." Thus spake Dinah Moore. ¶ Entering the brokers' offices, — prisons rather, — we walked along the grated corridors, looked into the rooms where the slaves had been kept. In the cellar was the dungeon for the refractory, — bolts and staples in the floors, manacles for the hands and feet, chains to make all sure. There had evidently been a sudden evacuation of the premises. Books, letters, bills of sale, were lying on the floor. ¶ Let us take our last look of the Divine missionary institution. Thus writes James H. Whiteside to Z. B. Oakes: — "I know of five very likely young negroes for sale. They are held at high prices, but I know the owner is compelled to sell next week, and they may be bought low enough so as to pay. Four of the negroes are young men, about twenty years old, and the other a very likely young woman about twenty-two. I have never stripped them, but they seem to be all right."

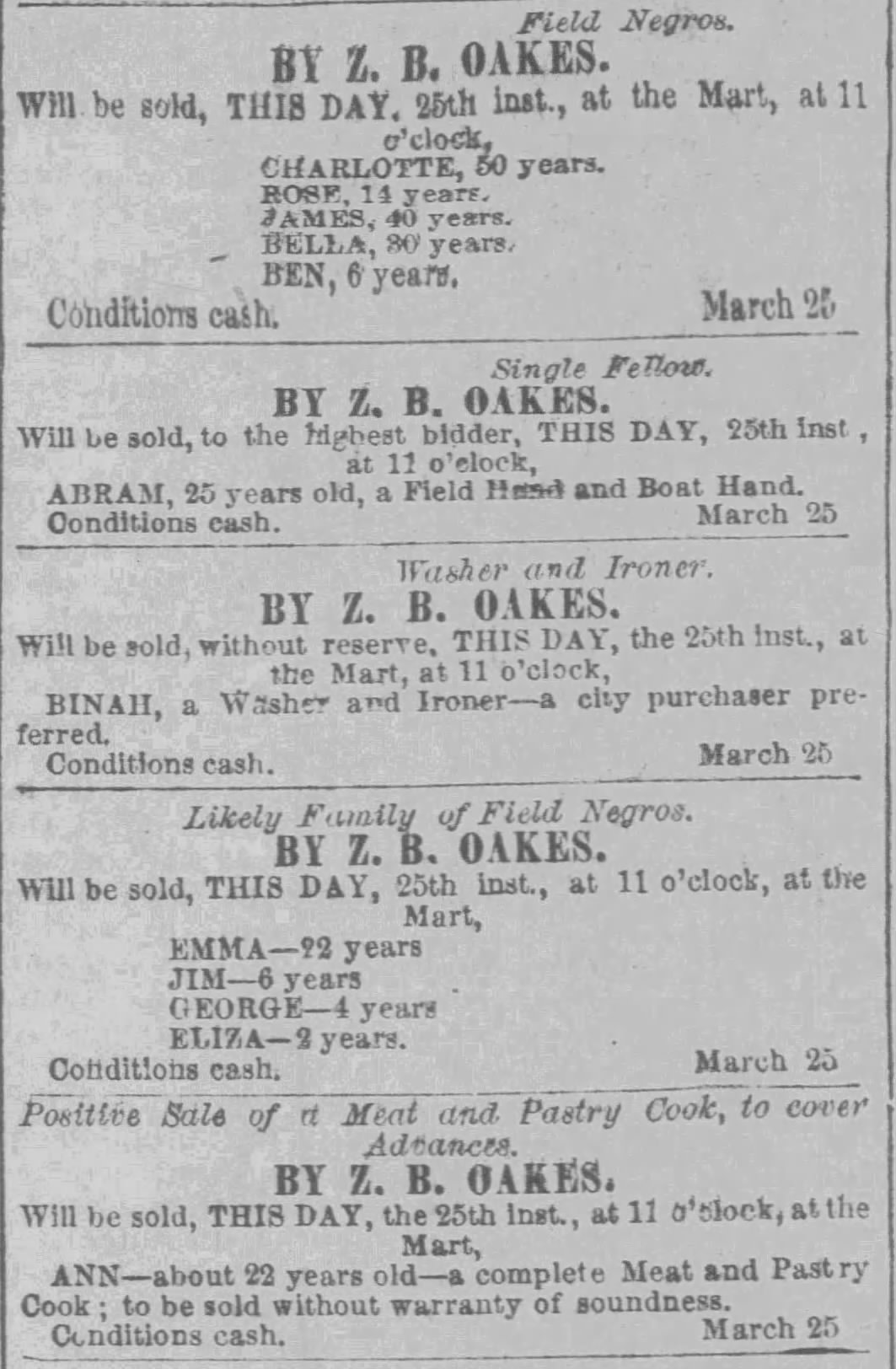
Charlotte, Rose, James, Bella, Ben, Abram, Binah, Emma, Jim, George, Eliza, Ann, for sale at the Mart, by Z.B. Oakes (Charleston Mercury, March 25, 1862)

Tadman describes the letters to Ziba Oakes collected by activist and journalist James Redpath at the end of the war as being of "great importance" in the study of the final decade of the South Carolina slave trade. In 1866, Oakes was back to work, continuing as an auctioneer and a broker of real-estate, and now offering insurance for "lives, cotton in transit and store, merchadize, buildings, and all other insurable interests." He was elected a supervisor of the high school in 1866. He was also a commissioner of the alms house, and a commissioner of markets, and was elected alderman from 1865 to 1868; "the notion that slave traders were looked down upon by the South's elite is contradicted by the prominent role Oakes played in Charleston society." At the time of the 1870 federal census Oakes' youngest daughter, still living at home, was 17 years old, and there are six other members of the household: Richard Morris (domestic servant), Eliza Brown (cook), Elizabeth Sinclair (laundress), are all listed as black, native to South Carolina; 13-year-old Rose Leggerman is listed as mulatto, native to South Carolina, with no listed occupation; Gus May, 35, and Edward May, 14, have no occupations listed, and are listed as black, native of South Carolina.

== Death and legacy ==
Ziba Oakes was an active member of his community who participated in a number of fraternal organizations. He died at the age of 63 years, 11 months, and is buried in Charleston's Magnolia Cemetery. His obituary made the front page of the newspaper.

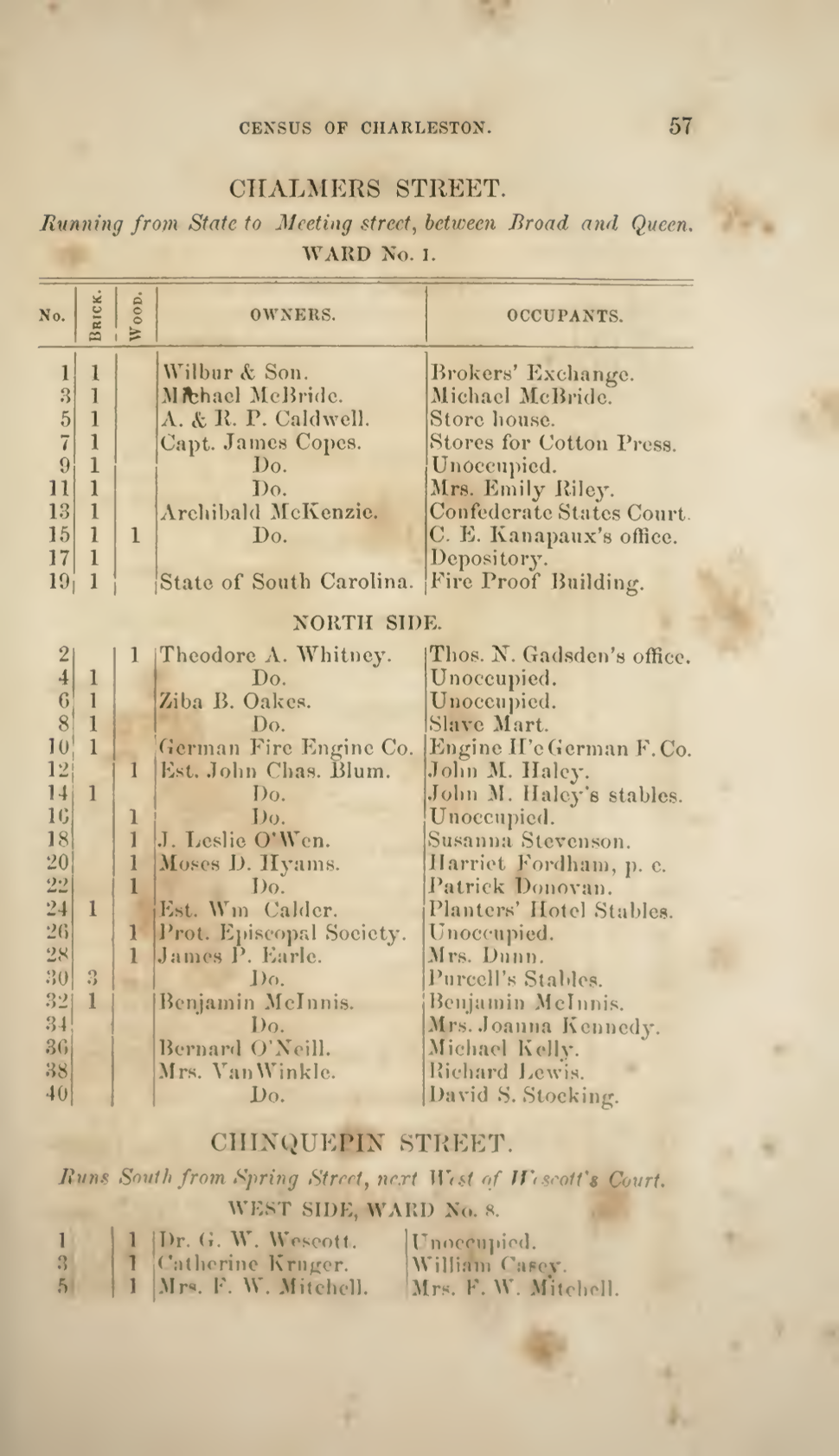
No. 6 - Brick - Ziba B. Oakes - Unoccupied - No. 8 - Brick - Ziba B. Oakes - Slave mart - "Chalmers Street," 1861 census of Charleston, page 57

As part of what was the apparently common practice of scrubbing "clean the records of...leading South Carolina slave dealers," the newspaper that printer Oakes obituary reported that he "had made his money 'in the Commission and Auction business,' but it failed to mention that much of that business had involved buying and selling people, or that Oakes had once owned Ryan's Mart." This kind of intentional forgetting was typical and persisted into the 20th century: "Despite Wilson's insistence that [6 Chalmers] had been associated with the internal American slave trade, many locals disparaged her claim. Of course, rendering the domestic slave trade invisible was a central aspect of the postbellum white South's reconstruction of its history and its promotion of an apologist's view of slavery. Tourist literature from early-twentieth-century Charleston was complicit in this process as it repeatedly denied the existence of slave markets in the city. C. Irvine Walker's 1919 Guide to Charleston. S.C. downplayed the practice of slave sales, describing them as uncommon though "necessary from time to time." Tourists were told that, for the most part, slaves were 'passed by inheritance from father to son.' Walker frankly attributed claims that the property on Chalmers Street was the 'Old Slave Market, so-called,' to that 'same partisan history which stigmatizes the institution of slavery.' A headline in 1930 in the Charleston News and Courier articulated further the local position: 'Building at 6 Chalmers Street Has Become Subject of Legend in City.'...the News and Courier reporter erroneously argued that the site could not have been a slave mart because there was never 'sufficient buying and selling of slaves in the city to have warranted the establishment of any institution for the purpose.'"

== See also ==
- List of American slave traders
- History of Charleston, South Carolina
- South Carolina Lowcountry
- South Carolina in the American Civil War
