= Citizens and Southern National Bank of South Carolina =

- U.S. National Register of Historic Places
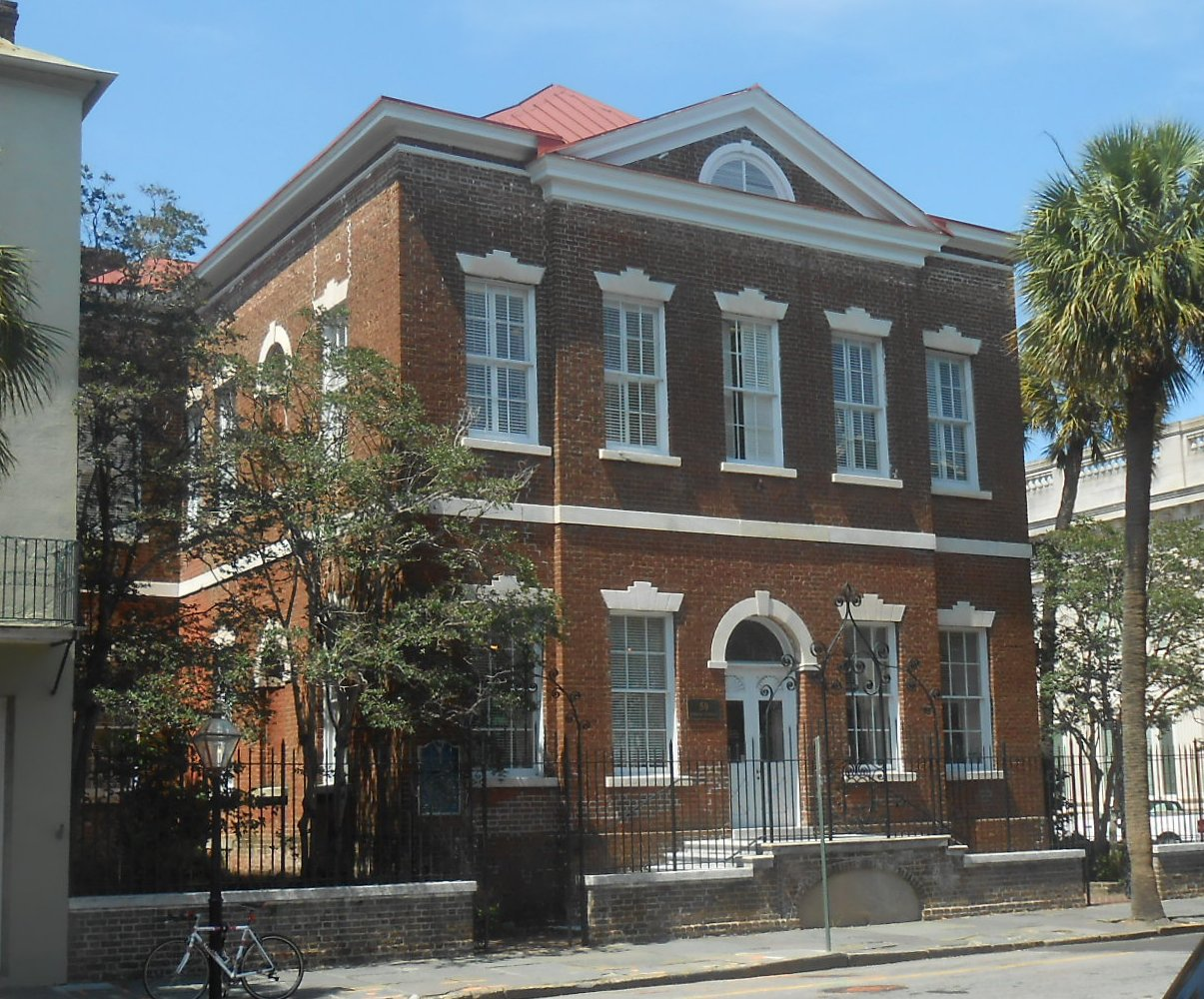
- Citizens and Southern National Bank of South Carolina

- Location within South Carolina Location within the United States
- Location: 50 Broad St., Charleston, South Carolina
- Coordinates: 32°46′36″N 79°55′48″W
- Area: 0.3 acres (0.12 ha)
- Built: 1835
- NRHP reference No.: 71000747
- Added to NRHP: May 6, 1971

Citizens and Southern National Bank of South Carolina is a building on 50 Broad St., Charleston, South Carolina. It was named to the National Register of Historic Places in 1971.
