= Jervey, Waring & White =

American slave auction firm (1828–1850s)

Jervey, Waring, & White was a slave auction and brokerage firm in Charleston, South Carolina, United States, operating mainly in the 1830s through the 1850s, prior to the American Civil War. The partners facilitated what is believed to be the largest individual sale of enslaved people in U.S. history, the partners being James Jervey, Morton Waring, and Alonzo White.

== Origins ==
Originally founded in 1828 as Jervey, Blake, and Waring, it was one of Charleston's most prominent slave trading firms in the antebellum period. It was founded by James Jervey, John Blake, and Morton A. Waring, a son-in-law of Paul Hamilton. They were headquartered on 20 Broad Street, now 24 Broad Street, in downtown Charleston. Jervey, Waring, & White conducted public auctions and private sales of enslaved Africans on commission. They regularly advertised in the Charleston Courier and sold captured individuals as well.

== Largest slave auction in U.S. history ==
Newspaper article for the Slave Auction, from Charleston Courier, 1835

On February 24, 1835, the firm placed an advertisement in the Charleston Courier announcing the public sale of 600 enslaved people. This group was described as "accustomed to the culture of rice" and including skilled laborers such as drivers, carpenters, coopers, and boatmen. This sale was held near the Customs House and is regarded as the largest slave auction in US history. Today it is referred to by some as The Great Charleston Slave Sale.

== Legacy ==
Their building at 24 Broad Street saw continued commercial use even after the American Civil War and was owned by the Charleston Savings Institution around 1885, Exchange Banking and Trust Company (from 1922), and American Mutual Fire Insurance Company (from 1947), before being purchased by private owners in 1989.
