= Lebbeus H. Rogers =

American inventor and businessman

Lebbeus Harding Rogers (1847–1932) was an American inventor and businessman from Cincinnati, Ohio.

Rogers was the founder of Mount Morris Bank in Harlem, New York. and the inventor of the system of burying utilities underground in flexible tubing. Roger held over 50 patents and was the author of four books. In 1870, Rogers founded the Rogers Manifold Carbon Paper Company in New York City, the first company in America, and possibly in the world, to produce carbon paper, even before the advent of typewriters.

A good friend of inventor Alexander Graham Bell, Rogers turned down an offer to purchase a tenth share of Bell's telephone patent, which would have ultimately made Rogers a very rich man.

Rogers died in his home in Portland, Oregon on December 16, 1932.
