= Charles Carleton Coffin =

American journalist (1823–1896)

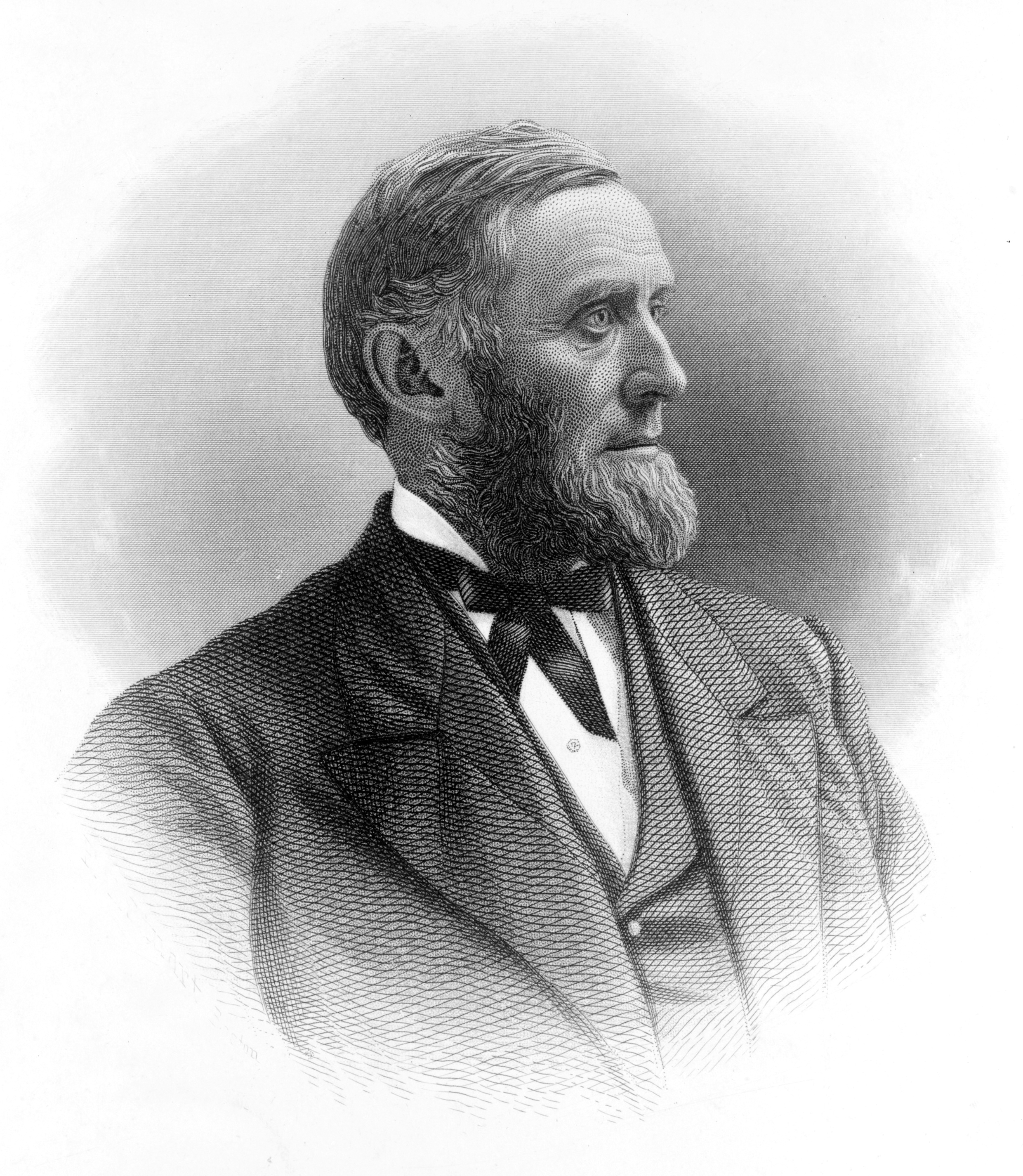
- Born: July 26, 1823; Boscawen, New Hampshire, U.S.
- Died: March 2, 1896 (aged 72); Brookline, Massachusetts, U.S.
- Education: Pembroke Academy
- Spouse: Sallie R. Farmer (m. February 18, 1846).

Signature
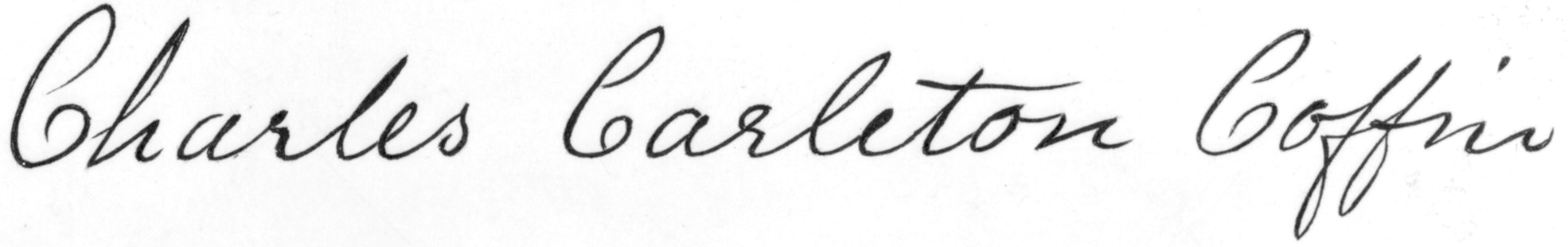

Charles Carleton Coffin (July 26, 1823 – March 2, 1896) was an American journalist, war correspondent, author and politician.

Coffin was one of the best-known newspaper correspondents of the American Civil War. He has been called "the Ernie Pyle of his era", and a biographer, W. E. Griffis, referred to him as "a soldier of the pen and knight of the truth".

== Life ==
A descendant of Tristram Coffin who arrived in the American colonies from England in 1642, Charles Carleton Coffin was born in Boscawen, New Hampshire, on July 26, 1823. Growing up in rural New Hampshire, he was home-schooled by his parents and briefly attended Pembroke Academy and Boscawen Academy. Village life revolved around the church, and in his teens Charles went to work in a lumbering operation and with $60 from his earnings, he purchased an organ, which he gave to the church, and became the first organist.

During an illness in 1841–42, he had purchased a book about surveying which had a profound impression on the young man. From it, he developed what one biographer calls "an engineer's eye," which led to an interest in roads, rivers and elevations. This interest became apparent later in his writings as a war correspondent. By age 21, Charles left Boscawen and went to the city of Boston where he hired on to a surveying crew working on the road from Boston to Concord, Massachusetts. While employed there, he suffered a severe injury to his ankle when accidentally struck by an ax wielded by a fellow worker. The injury ended that job and later prevented him from serving as a soldier in the Civil War.

Lacking in terms of formal education, Charles' keen mind enabled him to achieve a self-taught education in engineering, lumbering and music. After recovery from his ankle injury he found employment in the engineering division of the Northern Railroad, and on February 18, 1846, he married Sally Russell Farmer. Although childless, the marriage was a happy one lasting 50 years. Charles' active mind soon led him to become interested in the relatively new field of electricity and to work on a power line between Boston and Cambridge. At the behest of Sally's father, Charles played a major role in the construction of an electronically transmitted fire alarm system.

This was followed by a major change in vocation. Feeling that there was a public interest in concise news and opinion statements rather than long, formal editorials, Charles obtained employment with the Boston Journal newspaper. This led to another milestone in his life after Charles and Sally visited the Saratoga battlefield in 1854. Charles' grandfather had fought in this Revolutionary War battle in 1777, and the visit led Charles to reconstruct in his mind the positions and maneuvering of those who had participated. This interest would have a direct effect on his later reporting during the Civil War.

A few years later Charles Coffin inherited 80 acres (320,000 m^{2}) of land in Illinois, and he and Sally traveled west to inspect it. Shortly before this, Charles had visited Washington, D.C., and had become interested in politics as a result of listing to speeches by Senator Thomas Hart Benton of Missouri, and other well-known political figures. While in Illinois, this new interest in politics led Charles to attend the Republican National Convention of 1860, which was held in Chicago. After the convention Charles was a member of the group that travelled from Chicago to Springfield to advise Abraham Lincoln that he had won the party's nomination for the presidency. In his job as a newspaper reporter, he went on to cover the 1860 election campaign and was in Washington to cover Lincoln's inauguration in March 1861.

Long opposed to slavery and secession, there would be no question of Charles Coffin's loyalty to the Union cause but, due to the old ankle injury, military service which demanded long marches was not an option. It was Massachusetts Senator Henry Wilson who suggested to Charles that his eye for detail and his command of language would make him an ideal person to cover the war as a correspondent. On his own, and not employed by any specific newspaper, Coffin began visiting the army camps and fortifications around Washington and sending reports to a variety of newspapers. The reports included "human interest" stories obtained through interviews with military personnel ranging from newly enlisted privates to generals.

The first major engagement between the Union and Confederate armies was the battle of Bull Run (or Manassas, as it was called in the South) only a few miles out of Washington. Coffin was there, and his written accounts of the battle and its aftermath so impressed the editors of his old paper, the Boston Journal, that the paper hired him to "cover the war" at a salary of $25 per week. He worked alone, without assistants, and was frequently the first to get reports from the war's battlefields to the media. He was present at, or immediately after, most of the major battles in the eastern theater, including those of Antietam and Gettysburg. He was the first to break the story of the Battle of the Wilderness, and was to become the only news correspondent to serve throughout the entire war—from before the battle of Bull Run, through Lee's surrender at Appomattox.

Coffin was always welcome at Union Army camps and was well-known and on friendly terms with many of the highest Union officers, including General Ulysses Grant, who gave Coffin a pass that allowed him to go anywhere in the Union camps and on the battlefields. Coffin was present when General George Meade replaced Joseph Hooker as commander of the Army of the Potomac just prior to the battle of Gettysburg. Coffin rode with Major General Winfield Scott Hancock on the approach to Gettysburg, and then accompanied Gen. Strong Vincent and Col. Joshua Chamberlain on their way to the successful defense of the strategic hill known as Little Round Top. When the fighting ended after Pickett's charge, Coffin rode 28 miles (45 km) through a driving rainstorm in two and a half hours, and then boarded a train to Baltimore, Maryland, from where he was able to telegraph his story of the battle to the Boston Journal, the first news the nation had of that decisive battle.

Coffin was present in South Carolina when the flag was raised over the retaken Fort Sumter, and then hastened back to rejoin Gen. Grant for the final drive to Appomattox for Gen. Lee's surrender. During the war Coffin had used his middle name "Carleton" to sign off on his stories.

After the war Coffin returned to Boston for a well-deserved rest, but soon was at work on a series of books detailing his experiences as a correspondent. He wrote My Days and Nights on the Battlefield (1864), Following the Flag and Four Years of Fighting, both published in 1865. Between 1888 and 1891 he also published Drumbeat of the Nation, Marching to Victory (which contained a long account of the Battle of Gettysburg), and Redeeming the Republic. Later, Coffin made a trip to Japan, China and India and described that trip in a book entitled Our New Way Around the World. Finally, he turned to writing stories related to his boyhood and New England heritage, five books in all, and wrote several novels as well as biographical materials on presidents Abraham Lincoln and James Garfield.

Charles Carleton Coffin was not only well-known to many U.S. political and military leaders, but to many noted U.S. writers and to a large number of foreign dignitaries. His name is listed on the War Correspondents Memorial Arch at Gathland, Maryland. He died in Brookline, Massachusetts, on March 2, 1896, a few months short of his 73rd birthday.

== Books ==
- Our New Way Round the World (1869)
- The Seat of Empire (1870)
- Krinkle: A Story of American Life (1875)
- The Boys of '76 (1876)
- The Story of Liberty (1879)
- The Life of James A. Garfield (1880)
- Old Times in the Colonies (1880)
- Building The Nation (1882)
- My Days and Nights on the Battle-Field (1887)
- Redeeming the Republic: The Third Period of the War of the Rebellion in the Year 1864 (1889)
- Freedom Triumphant: The Fourth Period of the War of the Rebellion from September, 1864, to Its Close (1890)
- Abraham Lincoln (1893)
- Stories of Our Soldiers (1893)
- Daughters of the Revolution and Their Times, 1769–1776 (1895)
- The Boys of '61: Or, Four Years of Fighting; Personal Observation with the Army and Navy, from the First Battle of Bull Run to the Fall of Richmond (1866) (I have a book copy written in 1881 stating "entered according to Act of Congress in the year 1866")
- Marching to Victory: The Second Period of the War of the Rebellion, Including the Year 1863 (1899)
- Following the Flag: From August 1861 to November 1862 (1865)

== Bibliography ==
- The Bay State Monthly A Massachusetts Magazine of Literature, History, Biography and State Progress Vol. III, No. 1, Boston, Massachusetts: Bay State Monthly Company (1885), pp. 1–8.
