= Henry Lebbeus Oak =

American historian

- Born: 13 May 1844; Garland, Penobscot, Maine, United States
- Died: 20 May 1905 (aged 61); California, United States
- Scientific career
- Fields: History

Henry Lebbeus Oak (13 May 1844 – 20 May 1905) was an American historian, writer, archivist and librarian. He authored several bestselling books on the history of California and the American west coast.

== Early life ==
He was born on May 13, 1844 in Garland, Penobscot, Maine, United States. He never got married and never had any children.

He died on May 20, 1905 in California, United States, at age 61. He was buried in Chapel of Memories Columbarium and Mausoleum, in Oakland, California.

== Career ==
He served as the Librarian of the Bancroft Library of San Francisco, California. He held that position until 1887. He retired to Siegler Springs, California, and wrote about his family genealogical record.

He frequently collaborated with Hubert Howe Bancroft.

== Bibliography ==
He has written a number of notable books which include:

- Annals of the Spanish Northwest: North Mexican States [1531-1800]
- Early California annals, being that part of the author's series on the history of California covering the discovery and occupation 1542-1800
- History of Arizona and New Mexico, 1530-1888
- History of the north Mexican states and Texas. 1531-1889
- The native races of the Pacific states of North America
- History of the Northwest Coast

== See also ==
- Hubert Howe Bancroft
- Bancroft Library
