= List of largest slave sales in the United States =

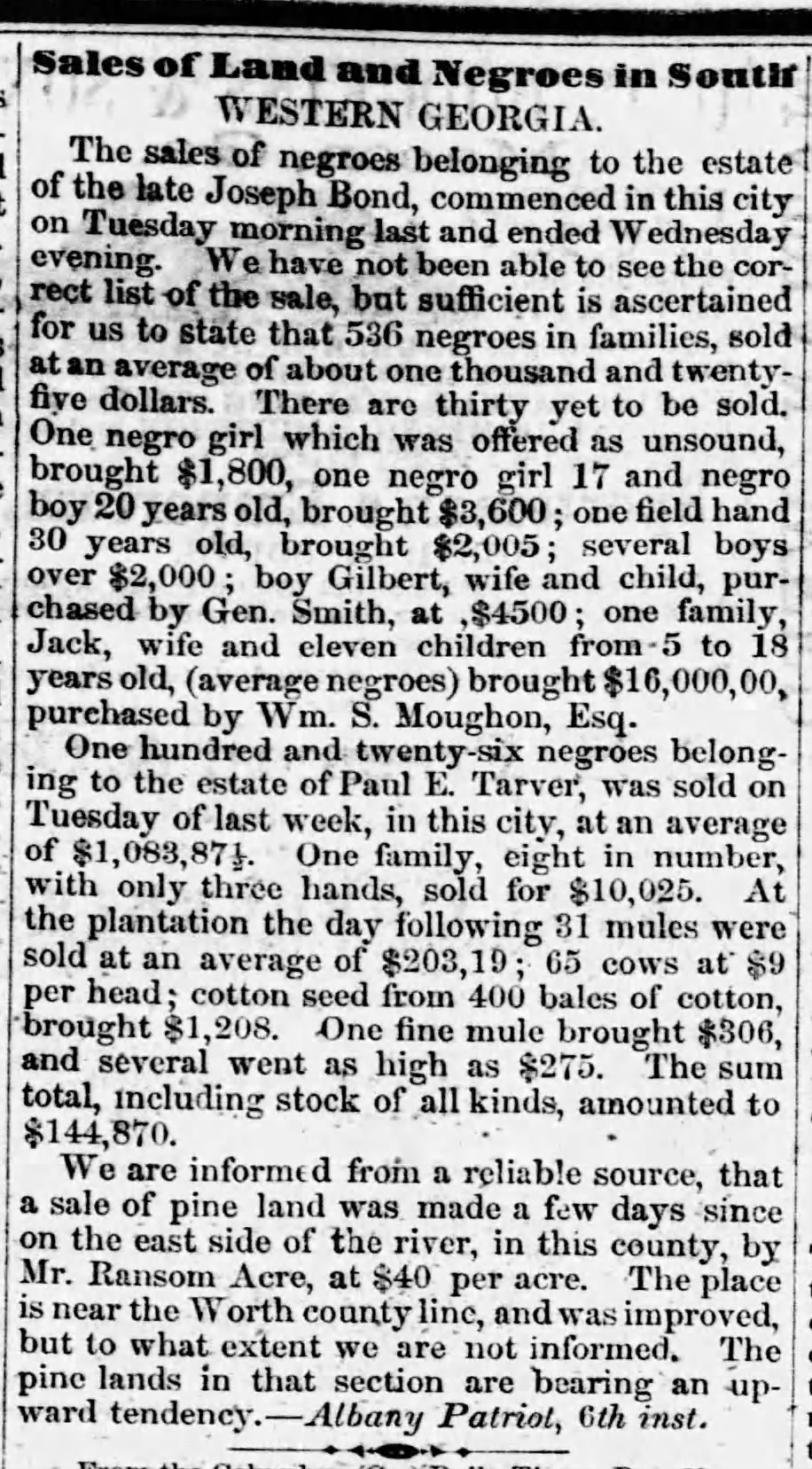
Listing for the Joseph Bond sale - "Sales of Land and Negroes in South Western Georgia," Albany Patriot via Macon Weekly Telegraph, January 17, 1860

This is a list of largest slave sales in the United States, as measured by number of people listed for sale at one time, usually all derived from the same plantation or network of plantations due to death or debt of owner. Note: In compensation for advertising the sale, housing the "product" prior to the auction, and managing the transactions, traders typically took 2.5% of the sales. Currently, the largest known single auction, was held by Jervey, Waring & White in 1835.

Newspaper article for the Slave Auction of Jervey, Waring & White, from Charleston Courier, 1835

| Sale | Number of people listed | Start date | Location | Owner(s) | Trader | Est. total value | Notes |
|---|---|---|---|---|---|---|---|
| The Great Charleston Slave Sale | 600 | February 2, 1835 | Charleston, South Carolina | John Ball Jr. | Jervey, Waring & White | US$222,800 (equivalent to $6,953,516 in 2025) | Ball's heir Ann Ball bought 215 of the 600 for US$79,855 (equivalent to $2,492,249 in 2025) |
| Joseph Bond estate auction | 566 | January 3, 1860 | Albany, Georgia | Joseph Bond | | US$580,150 (equivalent to $20,788,708 in 2025) | |
| Great Slave Auction | 436 | March 2, 1859 | Savannah, Georgia | Pierce Mease Butler | Joseph Bryan | US$303,850 (equivalent to $10,887,958 in 2025) | |

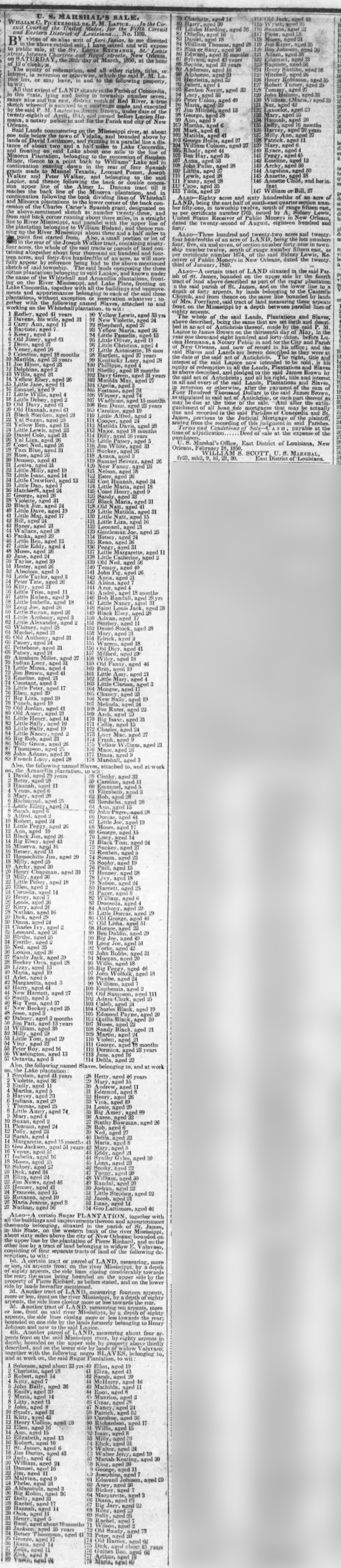
Under the auspices of the U.S. Marshals, 493 people, ranging from centenarian Old Sampson to 15-month-old Margarette, were to be sold from four plantations in Louisiana by auction at the St. Louis Exchange in New Orleans on Saturday, March 20, 1850 (The New Orleans Crescent, March 2, 1850, page 3); according to historian Damian Alan Pargas, there was a subsequent 1852 sale of property owned by the same man, P.M. Lapice, consisting of a plantation and 256 enslaved people: "The terms and conditions of the sale were simply 'cash on the spot'—no provisions for families to be kept together were specified."

== See also ==
- List of American slave traders
- Slaves in the Family by Edward Ball
