= Morton Waring =

American lawyer and slave trader (1783–1863)

Col. Morton A. Waring
- Photo of Morton Waring's tombstone

United States Marshal for the District of South Carolina
- In office 1813–1832
- Appointed by: James Madison
- Preceded by: Robert Burnham Cochran

Commissioner of Loans for South Carolina
- In office 1813
- Appointed by: James Madison
- Preceded by: Peter Freneau

Personal details
- Born: 4 February 1783 South Carolina, United States
- Died: 9 April 1863 (aged 80) Charleston County, South Carolina, Confederate States
- Spouse: Rebecca Hamilton
- Children: 6
- Relatives: Waring Family
- Occupation: Lawyer, marshal, slave trader, merchant, planter, politician
- Known for: largest auction of enslaved people in U.S. history

Military service
- Rank: Colonel
- Battles/wars: War of 1812; American Civil War

Morton Alexander Waring Jr. (February 4, 1783 – April 9, 1863) was a United States federal marshal, politician, state militia officer, slave trader, and South Carolina businessman who served as the personal lawyer for his father-in-law Paul Hamilton. He also was a partner of Jervey, Waring & White, a prominent business firm that was responsible for the largest individual sale of enslaved people in U.S. history. Over the course of his career, he sold and transported tens of thousands of enslaved Africans.

== Early life & family ==
Morton Alexander Waring Jr. was born in 1784 to Morton Alexander Waring Sr. and Edith Waring. On both his mother and fathers sides of the family, he was a descendant of Thomas Smith. His paternal great grandfather is Benjamin Waring. He married Rebecca Hamilton in 1805, she was the daughter of Paul Hamilton. He would go on to have at least six children with his wife.

== Career ==
Newspaper clipping showing Morton Waring acting as Paul Hamiltons lawyer

Waring held a federal appointment as Commissioner of Loans for South Carolina in 1813, a position associated with land sales and federal loans during the War of 1812 era. He offered to vacate this post to remain United States Marshal, indicating a brief tenure. In this role, he was likely involved in financial administration and local militia coordination during the war. Waring was appointed United States Marshal for the District of South Carolina in 1813, succeeding Robert B. Cochran. As Marshal, he was responsible for executing federal warrants, court orders, and managing local law enforcement duties in the district. He served in this role until approximately 1832. Waring was a partner in the Charleston, South Carolina commercial firm Jervey, Waring & White, one of the city's prominent auction and brokerage businesses. The firm, originally founded as Jervey, Blake & Waring in 1828, conducted major public and private auctions, including what is believed to be the largest single slave auction in U.S. history, with 600 enslaved people sold in 1835.

== Military service ==
During the War of 1812, Waring served as an officer in the state militia for the duration of the war. During the American Civil War, Waring, then in his late 70s, served in the Confederate Home Guard in Berkeley County, South Carolina. Local histories refer to him as "Col. Morton A. Waring," showing he led a group of local men in local defense and action.

== Later life & legacy ==
In his later years, his money dried up, and some referred to him as "suffering severe financial reversal". He died during the American Civil War at age 80. His house in Charleston, South Carolina, the Morton Waring House, still stands, and is owned by Darius Rucker.
