= List of slave traders of the United States =

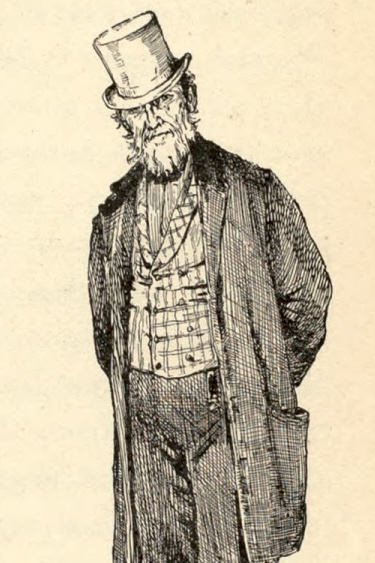
Mary A. Livermore was a private tutor at a Virginia plantation around 1840. She commissioned this illustration for her memoir. The accompanying text reads: "Do all slave traders look alike?" inquired Mary. "All that I've ever seen, do. They're all long and gawky, an' have no hair on top o' their heads; an' they all squint or are cross-eyed; an' they're all bow-legged, or limp; an' they all spit in the fire, an' they've all had the small-pox, an' they all look jess like this fellar." We all laughed at Dick's graphic description. "Pray, how many slave traders have you seen, in the course of your not very long life?" I asked. "There's been two here afore, an' there was one down to The Oaks, when we were there. Jim an' me talked with 'im. An' once when me an' Pa went to Boydon, I saw half a dozen of 'em, an' talked with 'em. They're mighty mean ornary men; slave traders are like this fellar, an' wear jess such baggy, butte' nut breeches, that don't fit 'em. I can tell if this fellar's a slave trader, quick as wink, when I hear 'im talk."

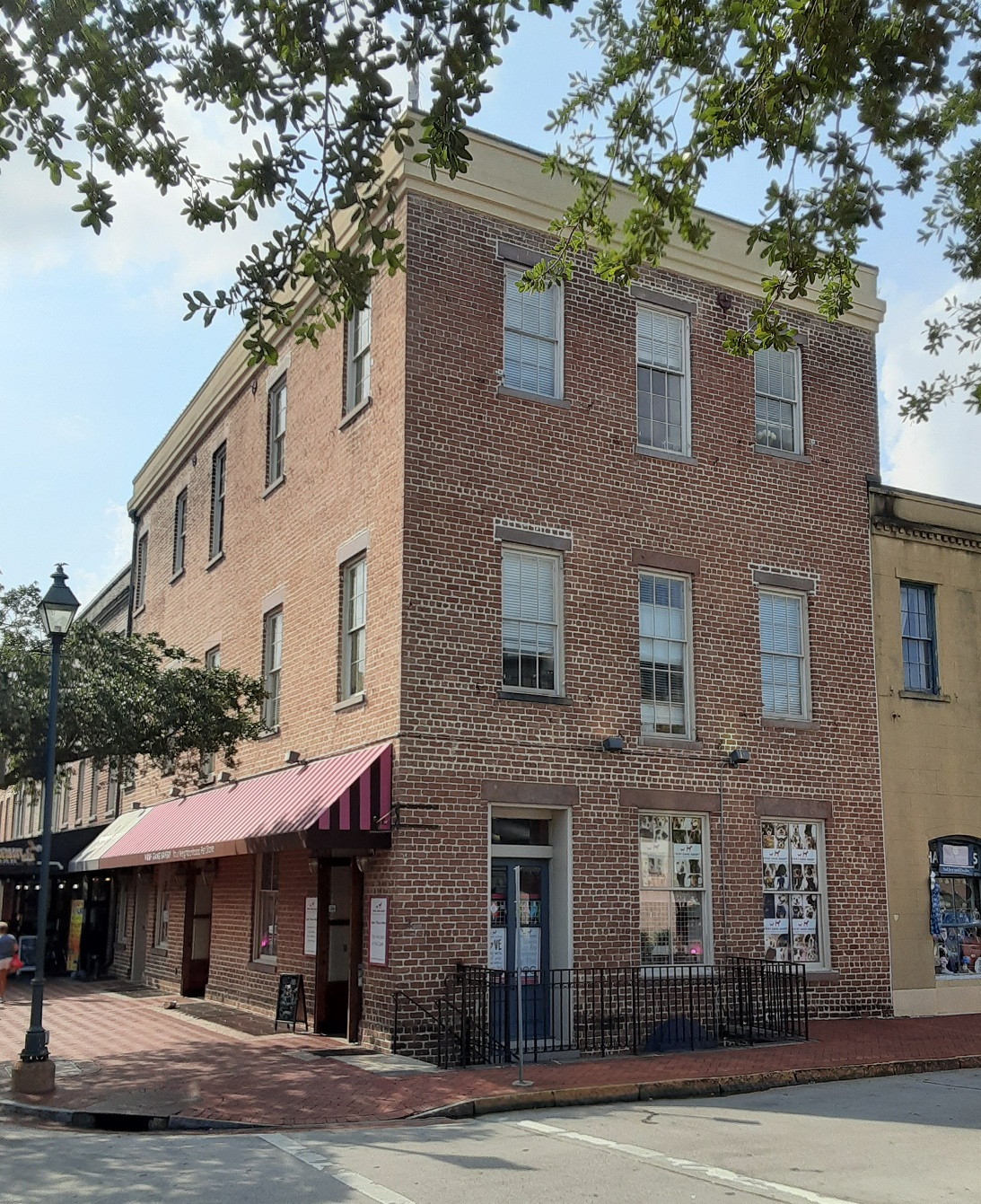
When the Union Army entered Savannah, Georgia, during the American Civil War, they occupied what is now called the John Montmollin Building. This building had a large sign that read "A. Bryan's Negro Mart" and was described as having "handcuffs, whips, and staples for tying, etc.; bills of sale of slaves by hundreds, and letters, all giving faithful description of the hellish business." The building became one of two schools for children of freedmen that were opened on January 10, 1865. The schools had 500 students, and were operated by the Savannah Educational Association, which was "supported entirely by the freedmen, [and] collected and expended $900 for educational purposes in its first year of operation."

This is a list of slave traders of the United States, people whose occupation or business was the slave trade in the United States. Slave traders were human traffickers that bought and sold people as property, also called "chattel" or "commodities". The people who were enslaved and bought and sold were primarily Africans and African-American people in the Southern United States from the time of the United States Declaration of Independence in 1776 until the defeat of the Confederate States of America in 1865, ending the American Civil War.

The Act Prohibiting Importation of Slaves was passed into law in 1808 under the Star-Spangled Banner flag, when there were 15 states in the Union. This Act, combined with the Slave Trade Act of 1794 and the Slave Trade Act of 1800, prohibited U.S. citizens from engaging in the international slave trade between nations:

- Slave Trade Act of 1794: This law prohibited U.S. citizens from using American ships to transport slaves to foreign countries. It also made it illegal to outfit a vessel for this purpose from U.S. ports.
- Slave Trade Act of 1800: This act built on the 1794 law, making it illegal for U.S. citizens to engage in the international slave trade, even on foreign vessels. It also increased penalties for those involved.
- Act Prohibiting the Import of Slaves of 1807: Signed into law by president Thomas Jefferson and effective January 1, 1808, this landmark legislation banned the importation of enslaved people into the United States.

These laws did not apply to the domestic or interstate slave trade in the US, which continued through the end of the civil war. The laws did apply to the transatlantic slave trade and prohibited U.S. citizens from participating in it. Little to no enforcement of these laws resulted in a dramatic increase of the illegal slave trade. U.S. slave traders and slavery oligarchs established new trade routes with other countries, primarily Brazil and Cuba.

Over 50 years later, in 1865, the last American slave sale was made somewhere in the rebel Confederacy. In the intervening years, the politics surrounding the addition of 20 new states to the Union had been almost overwhelmingly dominated by whether or not those states would have legal slavery.

Slavery was widespread, so slave trading was widespread, and "When a planter died, failed in business, divided his estate, needed ready money to satisfy a mortgage or pay a gambling debt, or desired to get rid of an unruly Negro, traders struck a profitable bargain."

Slave traders were not limited to a single profession but were found across many levels of a society that profited from the practice. Terms used to describe occupations related to slave trading included the following:

Directly involved in the trade:

- Agents or General Agents
- Auctioneers
- Brokers
- Chancery Court Clerk & Master
- Commission Merchants
- Factors
- General Merchants
- Merchants
- Slave Dealers
- Slave Traders
- Traders

Involved in capture and transport:

- Agents or General Agents
- Captains of ships
- Clerks
- Collectors of Customs
- Crew members
- Customs Officials
- Drovers
- Jailors
- Justice, Justice of the Peace
- Masters of ships
- Notaries
- Police
- Sailors
- Sheriffs and Deputy Sheriffs
- Shipbuilders
- Shippers
- Slave Catchers
- Slave Hunters
- Slave Owners
- Slave Patrol

Profited indirectly from the trade:

- Financiers and investors: Wealthy individuals, firms, banks, and insurance companies provided the capital to fund slave trading voyages and the expansion of the plantation economy
- Colonial and city tax collectors: The taxes and duties collected on the purchase and sale of enslaved people were used to fund public works projects in port cities like Newport, Rhode Island.
- Business managers and overseers: These individuals managed the business affairs of plantations, where the agricultural labor of enslaved people was central to the economy.

Many slave traders often sold real estate, personal property, and livestock in addition to enslaved people. Large trading firms also had field agents, whose job it was to go to more remote towns and rural areas, buying up enslaved people for resale elsewhere.

Field agents stood lower in the hierarchy and are generally poorly studied, in part due to lack of records. For example, field agents for Austin Woolfolk "served only a year or two at best and usually on a part-time basis. No fortunes were to be made as local agents." On the other end of the financial spectrum from the agents were the investors—usually wealthy planters like David Burford, John Springs III, and Chief Justice John Marshall—who fronted cash to slave speculators. They did not escort coffles or run auctions themselves, but they did parlay their enslaving expertise into profits. Also, especially in the first quarter of the 19th century, cotton factors, banks, shipping and insurance companies did a great deal of slave trading business as part of what might be called the "vertical integration" of cotton and sugar industries.

Countless slaves were also sold at courthouse auctions by county sheriffs and US marshals to satisfy court judgments, settle estates, and to "cover jail fees". Individuals involved in these sales are not the primary focus of this list. People who dealt in enslaved indigenous persons, such as was the case with slavery in California, are included. Slave smuggling took advantage of international and tribal boundaries to traffic slaves into the US from Spanish North American and Caribbean colonies and across the lands of the Cherokee, Chickasaw, Choctaw, Muskogee, Seminole, et al., but American-born or naturalized smugglers, indigenous slave traders, and any American buyers of smuggled slaves are included.

Note: Research by Michael Tadman has found that "'core' sources provide only a basic skeleton of a much more substantial trade" in enslaved people throughout the South, with particular deficits in records of:

- Rural slave trading
- Already wealthy people who speculated to grow their wealth further
- All private sales that occurred outside auction houses and negro marts.

This list represents a fraction of the "many hundreds of participants in a cruel and omnipresent" American market.

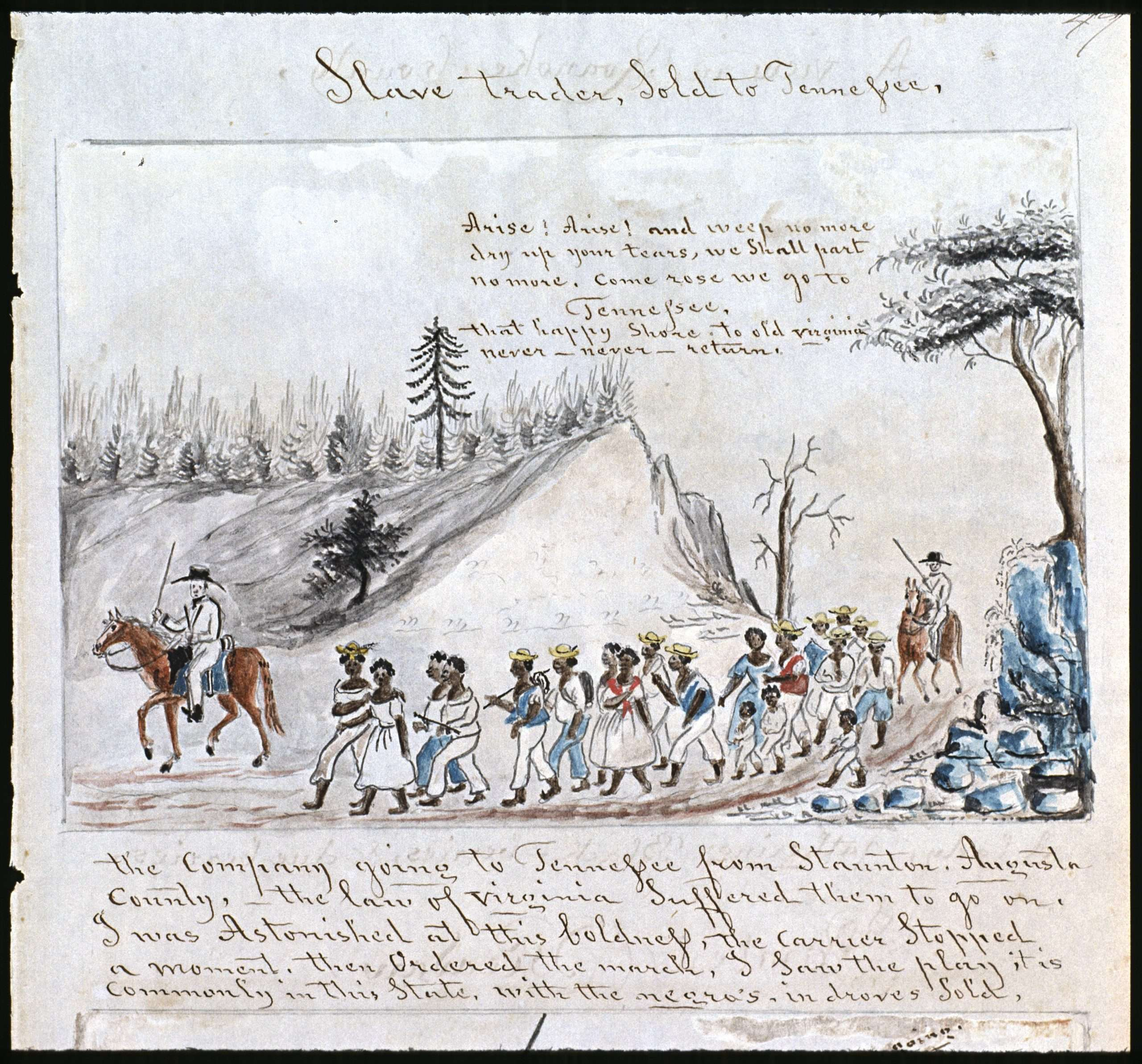
"Slave Trader, Sold to Tennessee" depicting a coffle from Virginia in 1850 (Abby Aldrich Rockefeller Folk Art Museum)

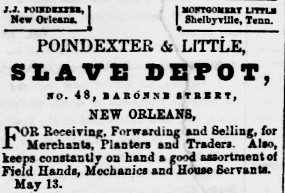
Poindexter & Little, like many interstate slave-trading firms, had a buy-side in the upper south and a sell-side in the lower south (Southern Confederacy, January 12, 1862, page 1, via Digital Library of Georgia)

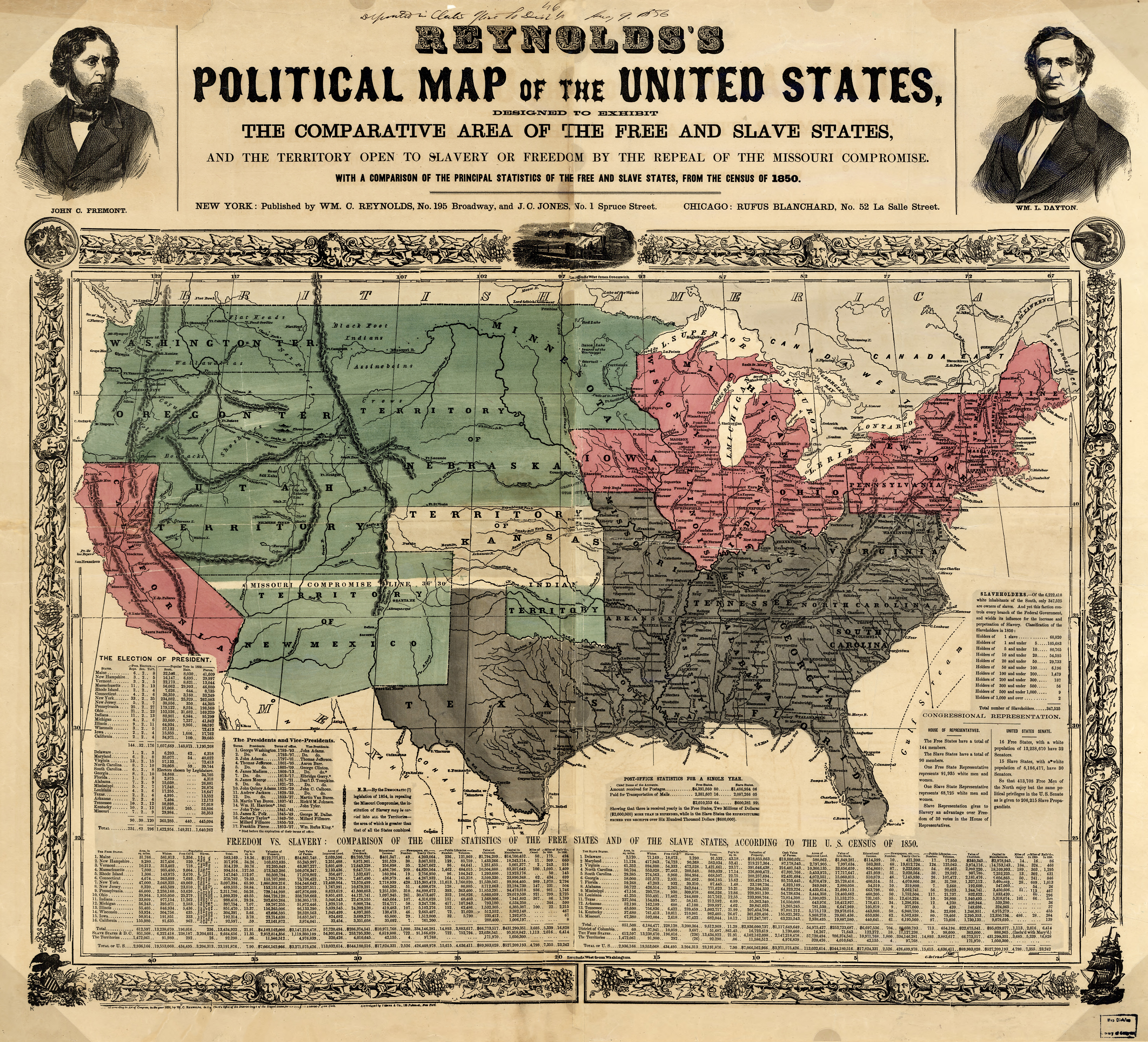
Slave trading was legal in District of Columbia until 1850 and in the 15 so-called slave states (listed in order of admission to the Union): Delaware, Georgia, Maryland, South Carolina, Virginia, North Carolina, Kentucky, Tennessee, Louisiana, Mississippi, Alabama, Missouri, Arkansas, Florida, and Texas (Reynolds's 1856 Political Map of the United States, depicting Missouri Compromise line, et al., Library of Congress Geography and Map Division)

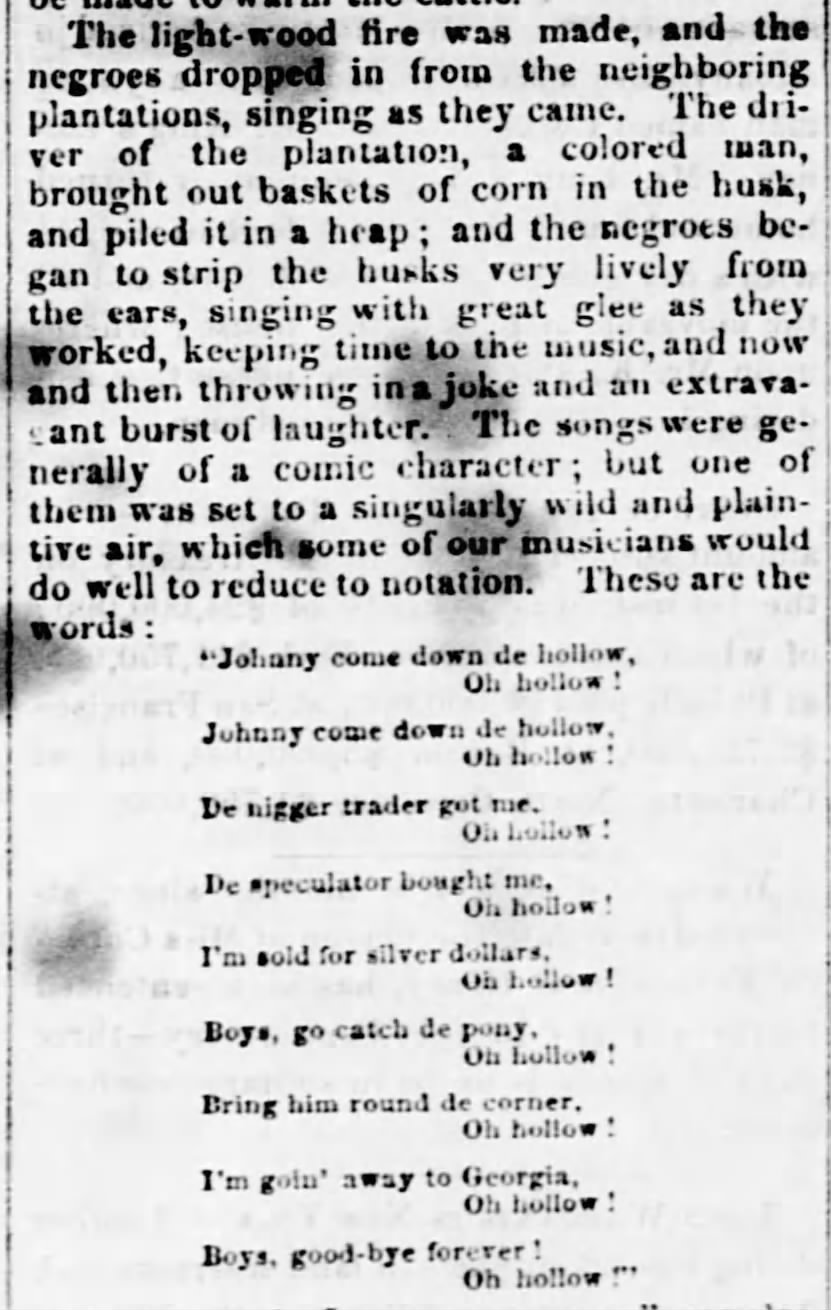
Lyrics to a "singularly wild and plaintive air" about the interstate slave trade, recorded in "Letter XI. The Interior of South Carolina. A Corn-Shucking. Barnwell District, South Carolina, March 29, 1843" in William Cullen Bryant's Letters from a Traveler, reprinted in The Ottawa Free Trader, Ottawa, Illinois, November 8, 1856

The following list is organized by surname of the trader or name of the firm, where principals have not been further identified.

Note: Charleston and Charles Town, Virginia, are distinct places that later became Charleston, West Virginia, and Charles Town, West Virginia, respectively, and neither is to be confused with Charleston, South Carolina.

"We must have a market for human flesh, or we are ruined."

— Frederick Douglass (1852) on the predominant message from the Southern states to the U.S. government in the years leading up to the American Civil War, The Frederick Douglass Papers, vol. II, p. 405.

== A ==
- Abraham, Anderson D., Buckingham County, Virginia
- Adams, John S., Gadsen's Wharf, Charleston, South Carolina
- Adkin & Boikin, Virginia
- Ailer, George, Virginia
- Alexander, Thomas, Charleston, South Carolina
- Algood, Mississippi
- Alsop, Samuel, Fredericksburg, Virginia.
- Anchor, North and South Carolina
- Anderson, John W., Mason County, Kentucky and Natchez, Mississippi
- Anderson, Pat, Tennessee and Louisiana
- James Andrews, New Orleans
- Andrews & Hatcher, New Orleans
- Andrius, Henry, New Orleans
- Apperson, George W.
- Armfield, John
- Arnolds, Francis, Carolinas
- Arterburn, Jordan and Arterburn, Tarlton, Louisville, Kentucky.
- Atkinson & Richardson, Tennessee, Kentucky, and St. Louis, Missouri.
- Austin, Georgia and Virginia
- Austin, George, Charleston, South Carolina
- Austin, Lewis L.
- Austin, Robert, Charleston, South Carolina

== B ==
- Bagby, Thomas, Macon, Georgia.
- Bagby, William K., Atlanta, Georgia.
- J. Russell Baker, Charleston, South Carolina
- Robert M. Balch, Memphis, Tennessee
- Rice C. Ballard, Richmond
- Ballard, William
- Balton or Bolton, Richard
- Banks, Tom, Richmond and Texas
- Barnard, E.
- Barrum, Virginia and Mississippi
- Bates, Virginia and Mobile, Alabama
- Beard, George Richard
- J. A. Beard & May, New Orleans, Louisiana
- Beard, Joseph A.
- Beard, Major, New Orleans, Louisiana
- Beard and Calhoun
- Bearly & Robert
- Beasley, Richard Renard
- Beasley, Robert, Macon, Georgia
- Bebee, Atlanta, Georgia
- Behn, George W.
- Bennett, Samuel, Natchez
- Bennett & Rhett, Charleston, South Carolina
- Berry, Daniel, Tennessee and Texas
- Betts, William, Richmond
- Betts & Cochran, Richmond
- Betts & Gregory, Richmond
- Beverly
- Beverly, Carter, Virginia
- William Biggs & Lyman Harding, Natchez, Mississippi
- Bishop, Richard Chambers
- Blackwell, John, Maryland and South Carolina
- Blackwell, Murphy & Ferguson, Forks of the Road, Natchez, Mississippi
- Blakely, James G.
- Blakely, Joseph G.
- Blakely, Virginia
- Blount & Dawson, Savannah, Georgia
- Boazman, James W., New Orleans, Louisiana
- Bolton, Dickens & Co.
- Booker, John, Virginia and Mississippi
- Booth, Robert, Richmond, Virginia and Alabama
- Botts
- Boudar, Thomas, New Orleans, Louisiana
- Bowen and Burgess, Virginia
- Bowers, J. E., Charleston, South Carolina
- Boyce, Kentucky and Natchez, Mississippi
- Boyce, Robert
- Boyce, Hamburg and Charleston, South Carolina
- Boyd, William L. Jr., Nashville
- Boyd, Whitworth, and Taylor, Nashville
- Brown, Tom, Virginia and Mississippi
- Bush, Edward, Tennessee
- Bradley, Return, Kentucky and New Orleans
- Brady, Dr., Hopkinsville, Kentucky
- Bragg, C. C., Charles Town, Virginia (Note: Charles Town, Virginia became Charles Town, West Virginia in 1863.)
- Robert B. "Old Bob" Brashear, Salem, Virginia; Alexandria, Virginia; New Orleans, Louisiana and Louisville, Kentucky.
- Brenan, Richard
- Elijah Brittingham, Virginia and New Orleans, Louisiana
- Thack Brodnax
- Henry Brooks, Georgia
- Will Brooks, Virginia and Tennessee
- John Brown, Tennessee
- S. N. Brown & Co., Montgomery, Alabama
- Brown & Taylor, Missouri and Vicksburg, Mississippi
- Brown & Watson, Montgomery, Alabama
- Browning, Moore & Co., Richmond, Virginia
- Bruher, New Orleans, Mississippi
- Bruin, Joseph, Alexandria, Virginia
- Bruthing, Alexandria, Virginia, and New Orleans, Louisiana
- Bryan, Alexander, Savannah, Georgia
- Bryan, Joseph, Savannah, Georgia
- Buchanan, Carroll & Co., New Orleans, Louisiana
- Buddy, J., New Orleans, Louisiana
- Buford, S. E., Jefferson City, Louisiana.
- Bugg, Zachariah
- Bunn, Redmond, Macon, Georgia.
- Burrows, Willie, Virginia?
- Busster, Georgia

== C ==
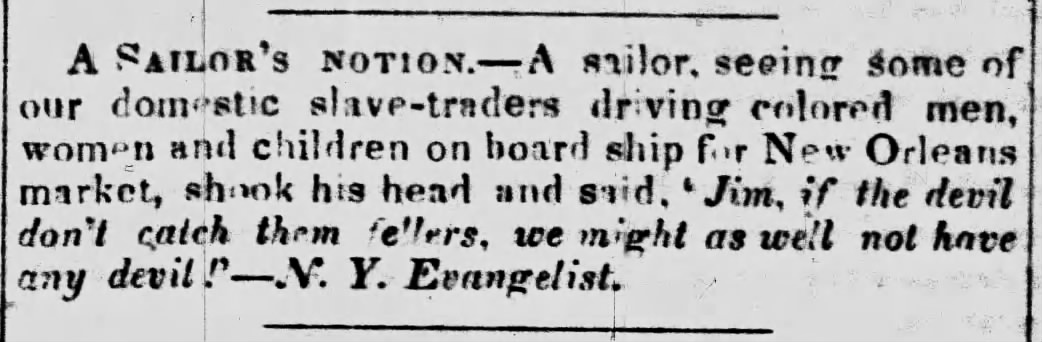
"A Sailor's Notion" The Liberator, March 24, 1837

- Caldwell, Joseph, Virginia
- Campbell, Bernard M., Campbell, Walter L., and relations, Baltimore, Maryland and New Orleans, Louisiana
- Capers & Heyward, Charleston, South Carolina
- Carrod, Mr., Mississippi and South Carolina
- Carter, John and Carter, Jesse, Virginia
- Cavel, Mr., New Orleans, Louisiana
- Cavendish, William, New Orleans, Louisiana
- Chabert, Leon, Louisiana
- Chrisp, John W., Memphis, Tennessee
- Clarant or Clavant, Richmond
- Clark, John, Louisville, Kentucky.
- Clark, William and Samuel, Virginia and New Orleans
- Clarke, James, Bayou Sara, Louisiana
- Clarke, Robert M., Atlanta, Georgia
- Cobb, Amaziah, Georgia
- Cobb, James G., Alexandria, Virginia.
- Cocks, John, Point Coupee, Louisiana
- Coffin, Charles, Boston, Massachusetts, 1734 "Just Imported" advertisement for the sale of enslaved children at the Seven Stars Tavern on Ann Street (now called North Street)
- Coffin, George M. Sr. (Coffin & Pringle), Commission Merchants, Adgers North Wharf, Charleston, South Carolina
- Coffin & Pringle, George M. Coffin and James R. Pringle, Factors and Commission Merchants, Adgers North Wharf, Charleston, South Carolina
- Coffin, William, Slave Trader, Louisiana
- Coffman, Joseph
- Cohen, Levi and Solomon, Atlanta, Georgia
- Collier, Edward
- Lewis A. Collier, Richmond, Virginia and Natchez, Mississippi
- Conel, Virginia
- Cooper, Richard
- Cotton, John
- Cotton & Wakefield
- Couper, John, Virginia
- Cox, William, Charleston, South Carolina and Aberdeen, Mississippi.
- Criddle, John, Virginia and Tennessee
- Creswell, Elihu, New Orleans, Louisiana
- Crosby, William, Alabama
- Crow, William, Charles Town, Virginia
- Cuculla, Seraphin, New Orleans, Louisiana
- Cummings, Clark, Clarksville, Tennessee
- Cunnigan, Mecklenburg, Virginia
- Cureton, John M., South Carolina
- Currie, David, Richmond

== D–F ==
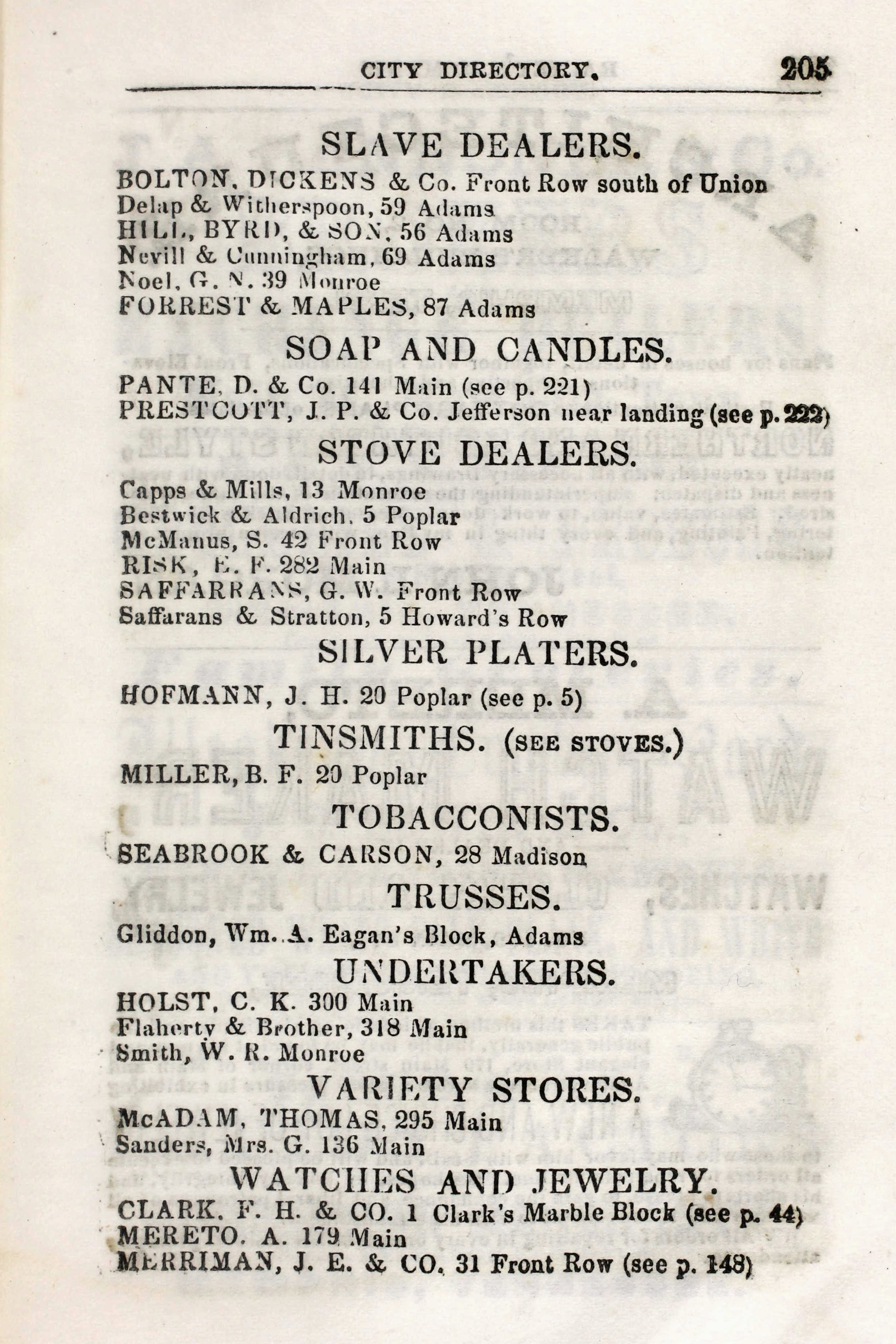
Antebellum city directories from slave states can be valuable primary sources on the trade; slave dealers listed in the 1855 directory of Memphis, Tennessee, included Bolton & Dickens, Forrest & Maples operating at 87 Adams, Neville & Cunningham, and Byrd Hill

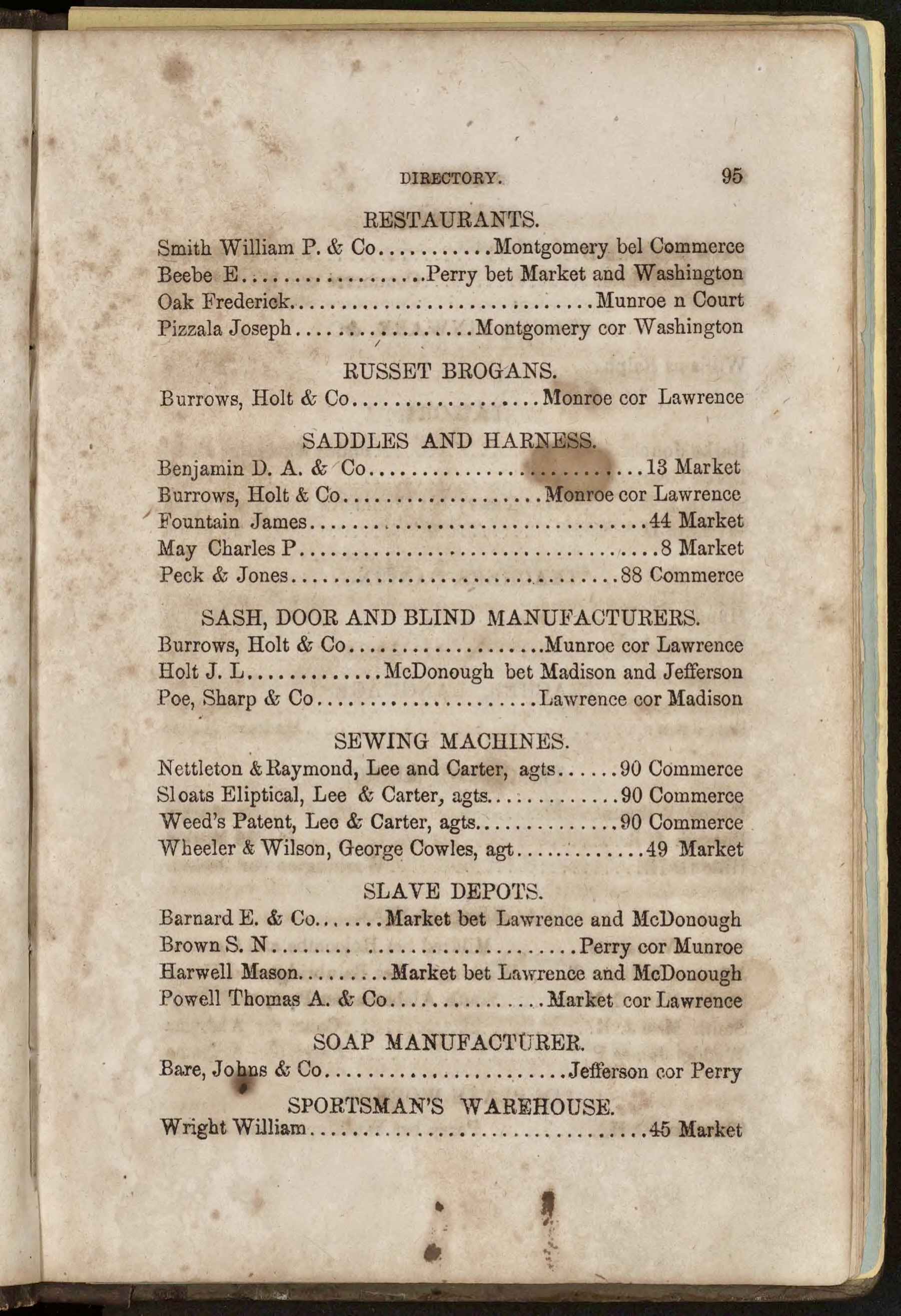
Slave depots, including ones owned by Mason Harwell and Thomas Powell, listed in the 1859 Montgomery, Alabama city directory

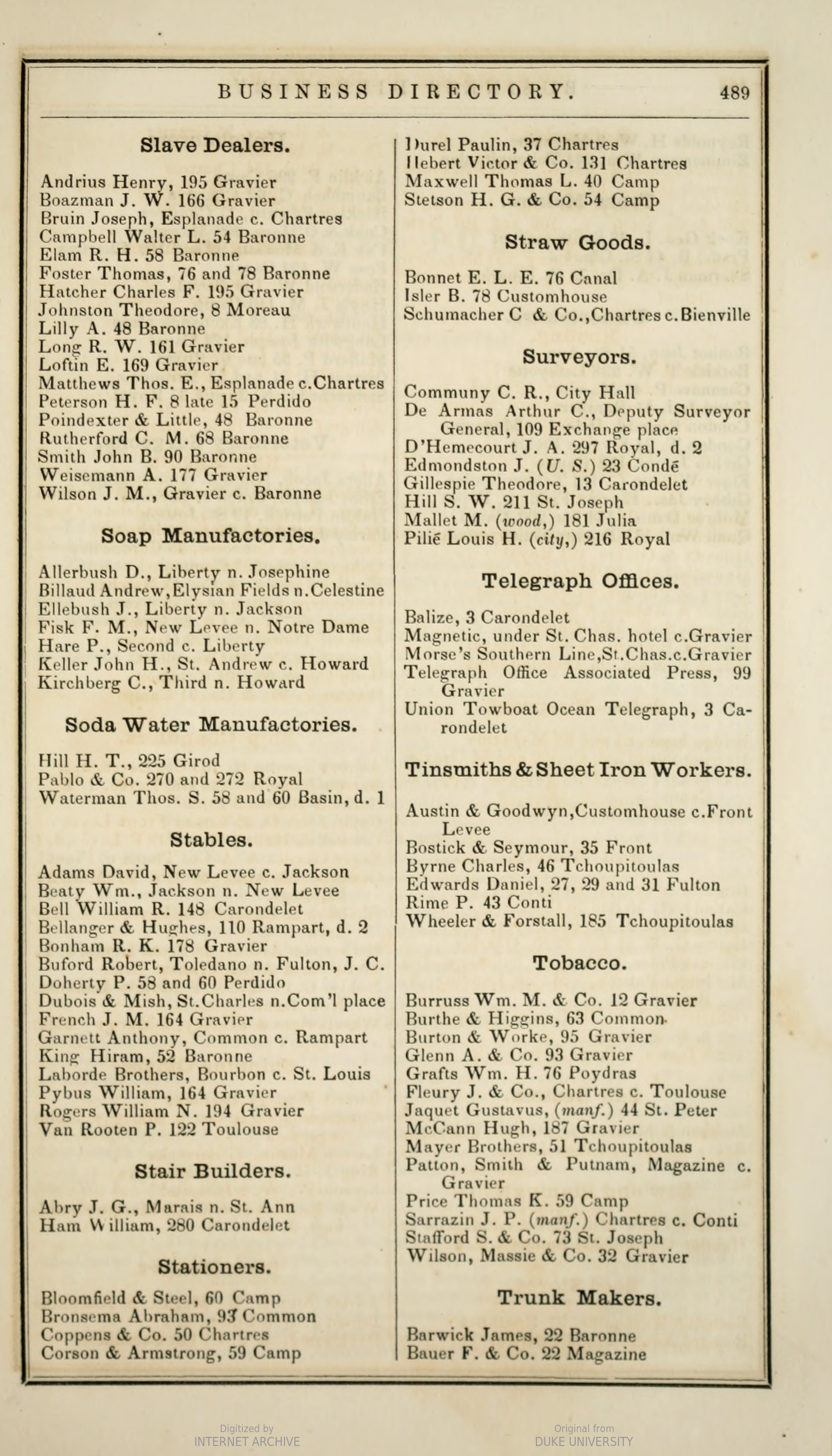
Slave dealers listed in the 1861 directory of New Orleans, Louisiana, including C. F. Hatcher, Walter L. Campbell, R. H. Elam, Poindexter & Little, C. M. Rutherford, and J. M. Wilson

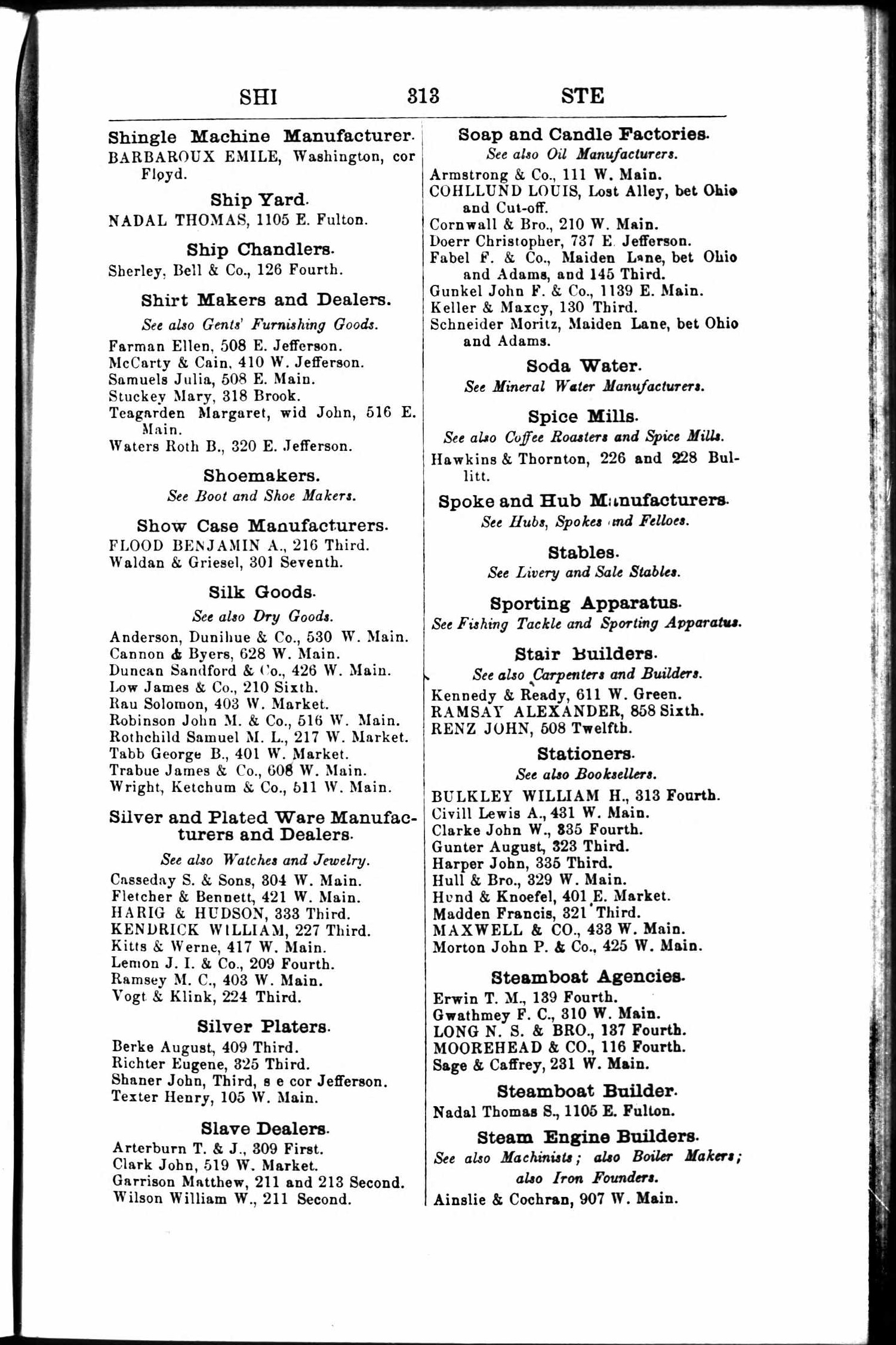
Slave dealers listed in the 1861 Louisville, Kentucky, city directory, including Matthew Garrison and Tarleton and Jordan Arterburn

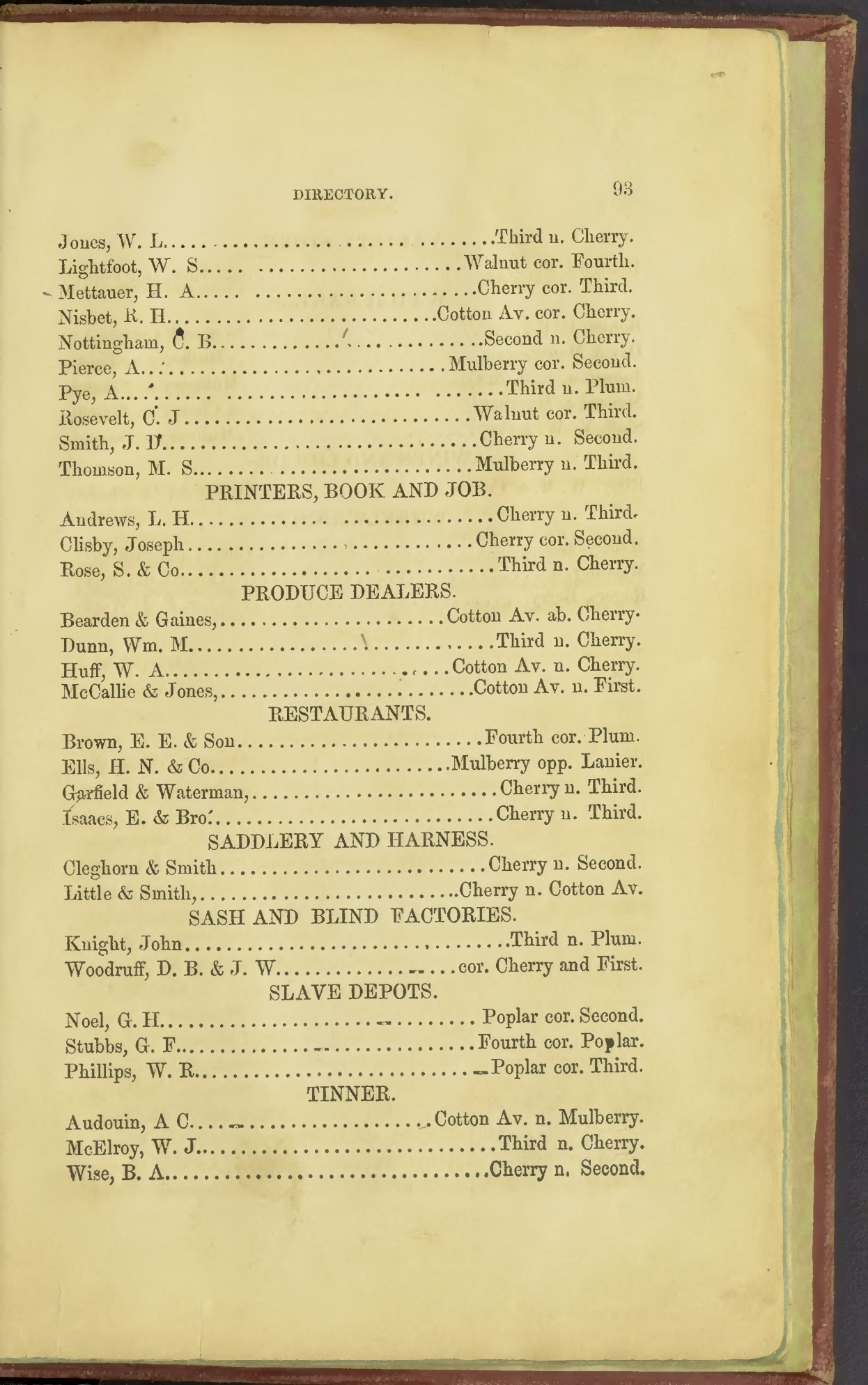
In 1860 the city of Macon, Georgia had a population of 8,000 and supported three slave depots (Digital Library of Georgia)

- John P. Darg, New Orleans
- Davis, Petersburg, Va.
- Ansley Davis, Petersburg, Va.
- Ben Davis, Virginia
- Benjamin Davis, Petersburg, Va. and Hamburg, S.C.
- Bob Davis, Richmond
- George Davis, New Orleans
- Hector Davis, Richmond
- James Davis, North Carolina (?)
- John B. Davis, Richmond
- Mark Davis and Benjamin Davis, Richmond and New Orleans
- R. H. Davis, Virginia
- Solomon Davis, Richmond
- W. C. Davis, Louisville, Ky.
- Davis, Deupree & Co., Richmond
- Samuel J. Dawson, Natchez, Washington, D.C. and Alabama
- William C. Dawson, Savannah
- Anderson Delap, Nelson Delap, and Norman Delap, Memphis
- Denton and Thornton, Richmond
- Charles de Gaalon
- William Deupree, Richmond
- Louis D. DeSaussure, Charleston
- Tom Dickens, Tennessee
- Edd. Dickerson
- Dickson, New Orleans and Mississippi
- Dickinson & Hill, Virginia
- Charles Dickinson, Maryland, Tennessee, and Louisiana
- C. W. Diggs
- James B. Diggs
- Samuel Dillard, Finncastle, Va.
- Dix, Virginia
- P. J. Doubourg & Co., Louisiana
- James Dowell, Virginia
- Downing & Hughes, Kentucky
- Droue, North Carolina
- Dryer
- James Dunahow
- William Dunbar, Mississippi
- Dupree
- Frank Eallem, Tennessee
- Eaton, New Orleans
- Benjamin C. Eaton
- Simeon G. Eddins and brothers, Fayetteville, Tenn.
- Alexander N. Edmonds, Memphis
- R. H. Elam, New Orleans and Forks of the Road, Natchez, Miss.
- Jim Elerson, Missouri and Arkansas
- Ellis, Louisiana
- John Ellis, Fredericksburg, Va.
- W. Ellis, South Carolina
- English, North Carolina and Mississippi
- Joseph Ennells, Pennsylvania
- Erskine, Richmond (and Mississippi?)
- Joseph Erwin, John Erwin, Abraham Wright, and Billings, and Joseph Thompson, possibly Samuel Spraggins, Tennessee and Louisiana
- Ben Farley, New Orleans
- William Ferrill, Virginia and Mobile, Ala.
- James L. Ficklin, Charleston, Va.
- Hugh Fisher, Louisiana
- Samuel R. Fondren, Richmond
- Ford, Kentucky, Mississippi, and New Orleans
- Nathan Bedford Forrest, John N. Forrest, Aaron H. Forrest, William H. Forrest, Jesse A. Forrest, and Jeffrey E. Forrest, Memphis, and Grenada and Vicksburg, Miss.
- John W. Forward
- Thomas Foster, New Orleans
- Isaac Franklin, New Orleans
- James Rawlings Franklin
- Captain Frazier
- John Freeman, New Orleans
- Theophilus Freeman, New Orleans
- Thomas J. Frisby, New Orleans

== G ==
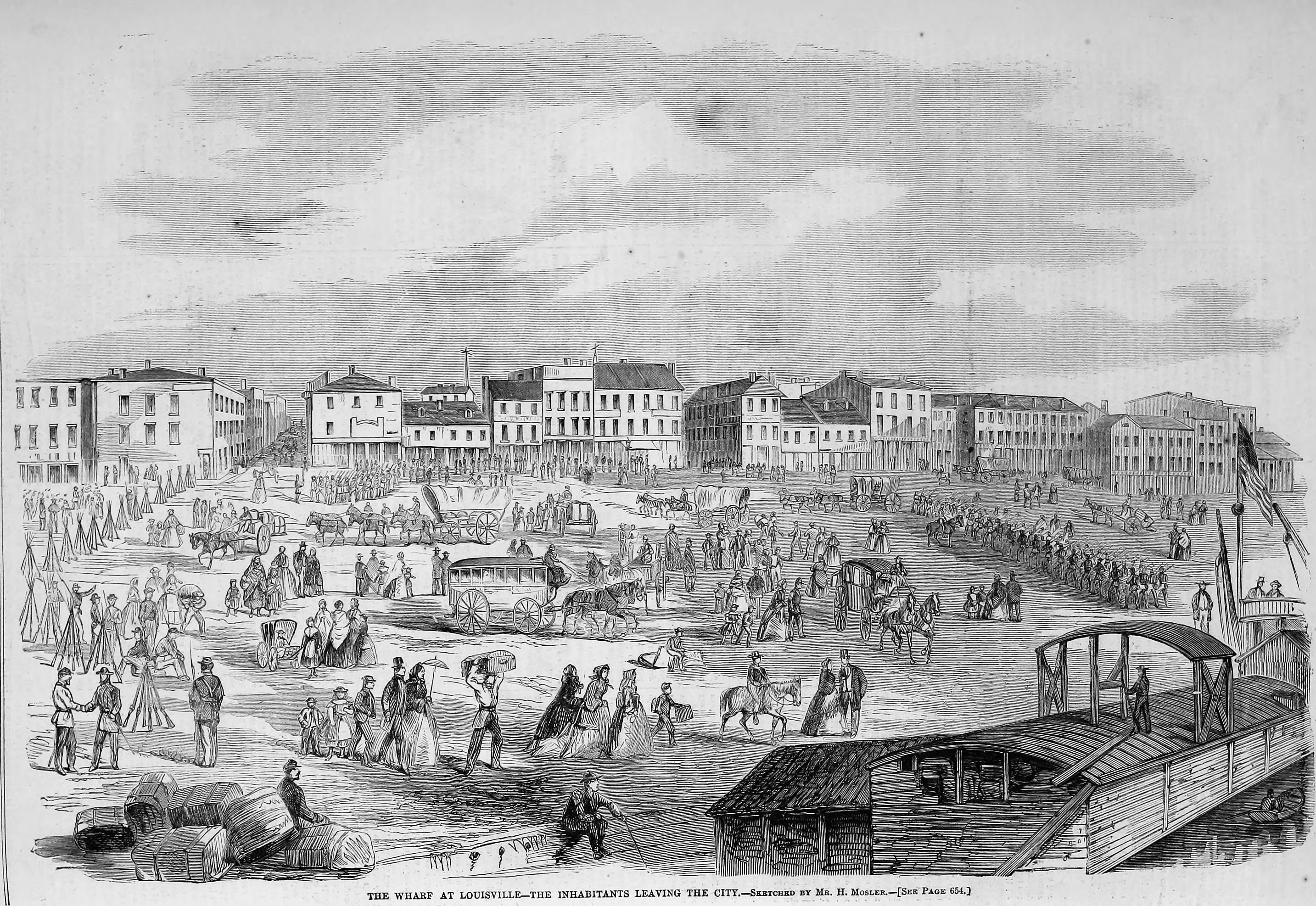
This 1862 etching of the Louisville wharf shows the view slaves might have had of the city before beginning the steamboat journey to the slave markets of the Deep South

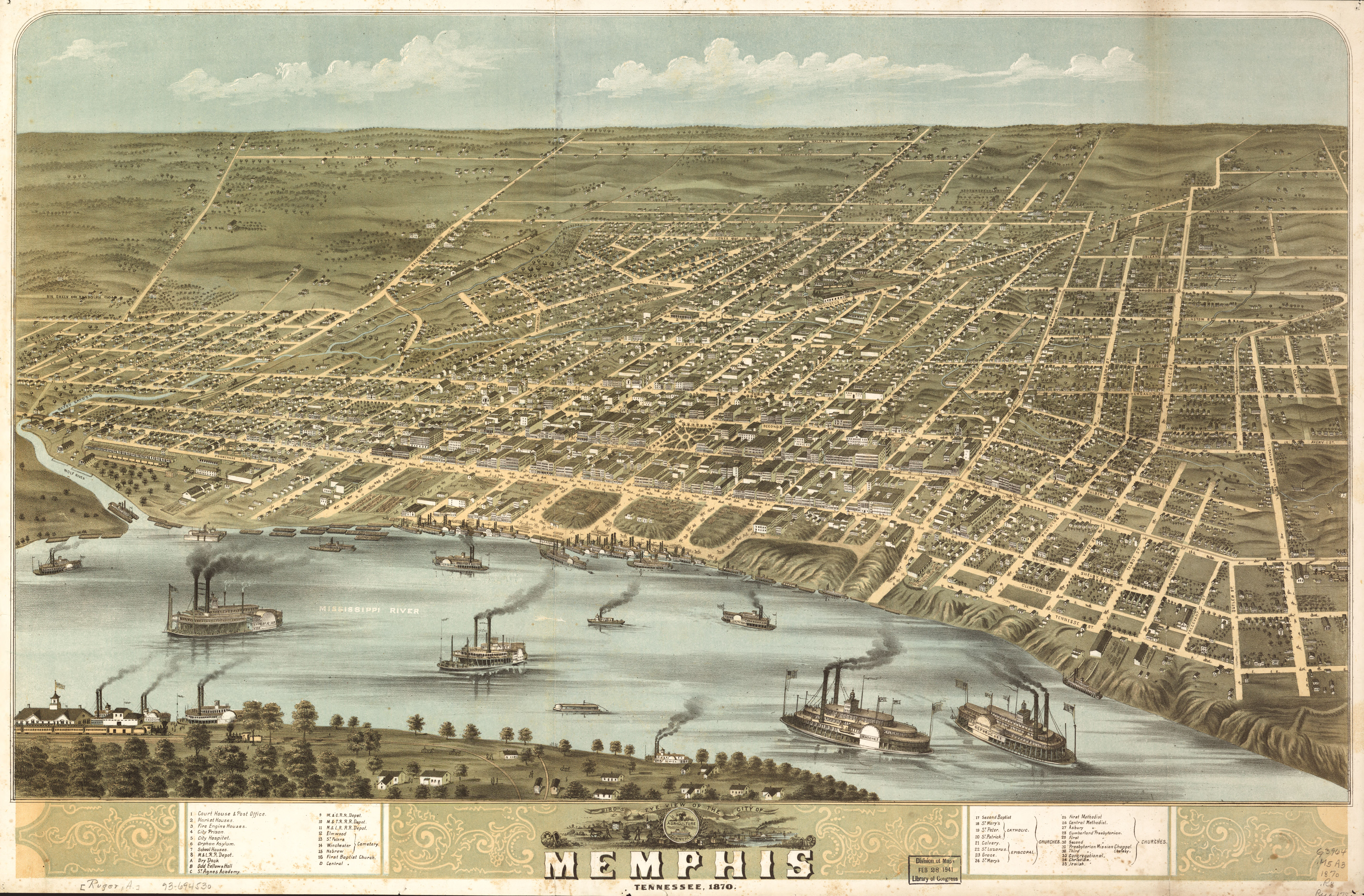
Bird's eye view of the city of Memphis, Tennessee 1870; the city's slave pens had mostly been clustered on Adams

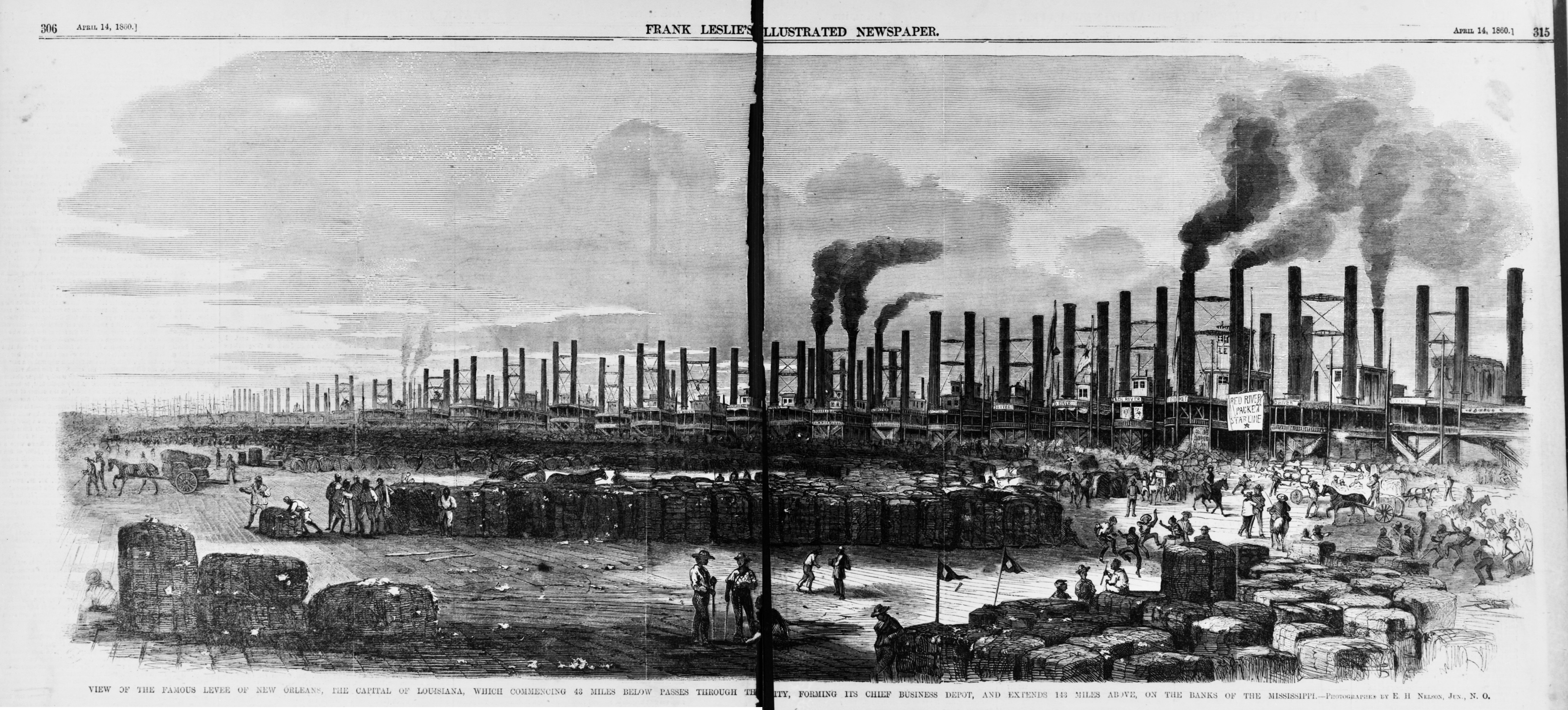
New Orleans levee just prior to the American Civil War

- Thomas Norman Gadsden, Charleston
- Mr. Gaines (or Gains or Goins)
- Galbert, Texas
- Samuel Galloway III, Maryland
- Jose Gamden, Texas and Tennessee
- James Gardner
- Matthew Garrison, Louisville, Ky.
- J. C. Gentry, Louisville, Ky.
- Gibson & Broadfoot, Charleston
- John M. Gilchrist, Charleston
- John Gildersleeves, New Bern, N.C.
- William Gillesbey, North Carolina and Mississippi
- Alexander Gilliam, Richmond
- C. E. Girardey & Co., New Orleans
- Tyre Glen, North Carolina (?)
- William Glover, Elizabeth City, North Carolina
- Thomas Golden, Fairfax, Va.
- Robert Golikely, Richmond and Mississippi
- Goodbar, Tennessee and Montgomery, Ala.
- Thomas Goude
- Grady & Tate, Richmond, Va.
- James Grant, New Orleans
- Hinton Graves, Georgia
- William Green
- William H. Griggs, Virginia
- Spot Grigsbry, Virginia
- Andrew Grimm
- W. H. Gwin, St. Louis and Virginia

== H ==
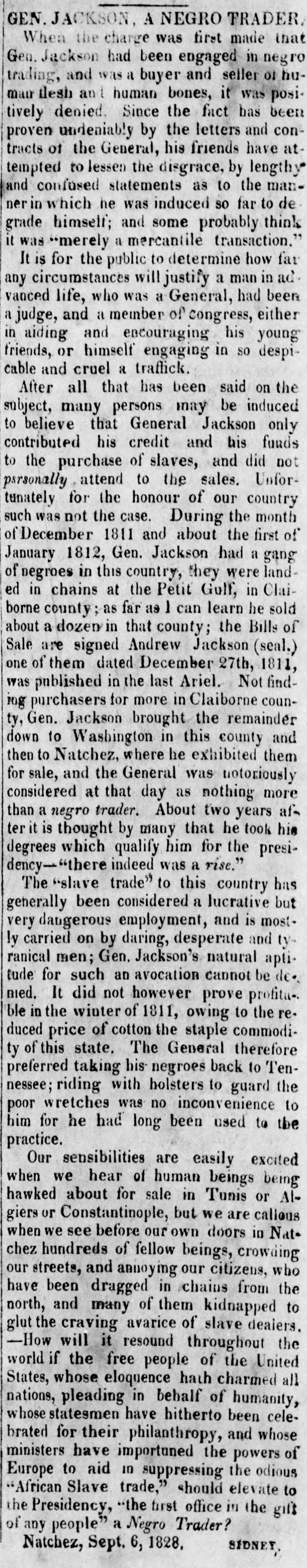
"Gen. Jackson, a Negro Trader" The Ariel, Natchez, September 8, 1828

- Haden, Washington, D.C.
- Haden, Leon Co., Texas
- John Hagan and family, South Carolina and New Orleans
- Hagar, Richmond
- Henry C. Halcomb, Atlanta, Ga.
- Mr. Hall, Norfolk, Va. and Mississippi
- William W. Hall, Norfolk, Va.
- Thomas Hanly, Halifax Co., Va.
- Benjamin Hansford, Natchez
- Giles Harding, Natchez
- James B. Hargrove, E. P. Aistrop, & N. A. Mitchell, Lynchburg, Va.
- G. C. Harness, Potomac River and Natchez
- William L. Harper, Virginia and Jefferson County, Miss.
- Harris, Virginia
- Benjamin J. Harris, Richmond, Va.
- John Harris, Kentucky and possibly kidnapping in Richmond, Indiana
- Harrison, Washington County, Ky.
- Hartzell and Douglass, Virginia, and Mobile, Ala.
- Hatch, Baton Rouge (?), Louisiana
- C. F. Hatcher, New Orleans
- J. T. Hatcher, New Orleans
- E. S. Hawkins, Nashville
- John Hawkins, Virginia & Robert Hawkins, Mississippi
- Robert C. Hawkins, Natchez
- William Hawkins
- Henry H. Haynes, Nashville
- James Hearn, South Carolina and Louisiana
- W. H. Henderson, Atlanta, Ga.
- William Henderson, Mobile, Ala.
- Henson, South Carolina and Georgia
- Heway, North Carolina and Alabama
- Hewlett & Bright, New Orleans
- James Hibler, South Carolina and Alabama
- Peter Hickman, near Jonesboro, Tenn.
- Buck Hicks, Goochland Co., Va. and Alabama
- Joseph Hicks
- Byrd Hill, Memphis & William C. Hill, Memphis
- Charles Hill, Richmond
- Nathaniel Boush Hill and Charles B. Hill, Richmond
- Hill & Powell, Memphis
- G. H. Hitchings, Nashville
- Samuel N. Hite, New Orleans
- Hockens, Missouri (?)
- Holloway, Virginia and Jefferson Co., Miss.
- Francis Holmes III, Charles Town, Berkely County, South Carolina (now Charleston, Scouth Carolina)
- Edward Home, Alexandria, Va.
- Judge Houston, Hopkinsville, Ky.
- Pleas Howard, Virginia
- Joe Hudson, Virginia and Alabama
- James Huie, South Carolina and New Orleans
- James Huie & Robert Huie
- James Huie and Josiah Huie, Rowan County, North Carolina
- Bob Huay, North Carolina
- J. Hull
- John W. Hundley, Natchez, Miss.
- Thomas Hundley, Halifax Co. Va. and New Orleans
- Hunnicut, Virginia
- William Hunt
- Alex. Hunter, Natchez
- Billy Hunter, Virginia and South Carolina
- John Hunter, Louisville
- Peter Hunter, near Lynchburg, Va.
- Foster Hurst, New Orleans

== I–J ==
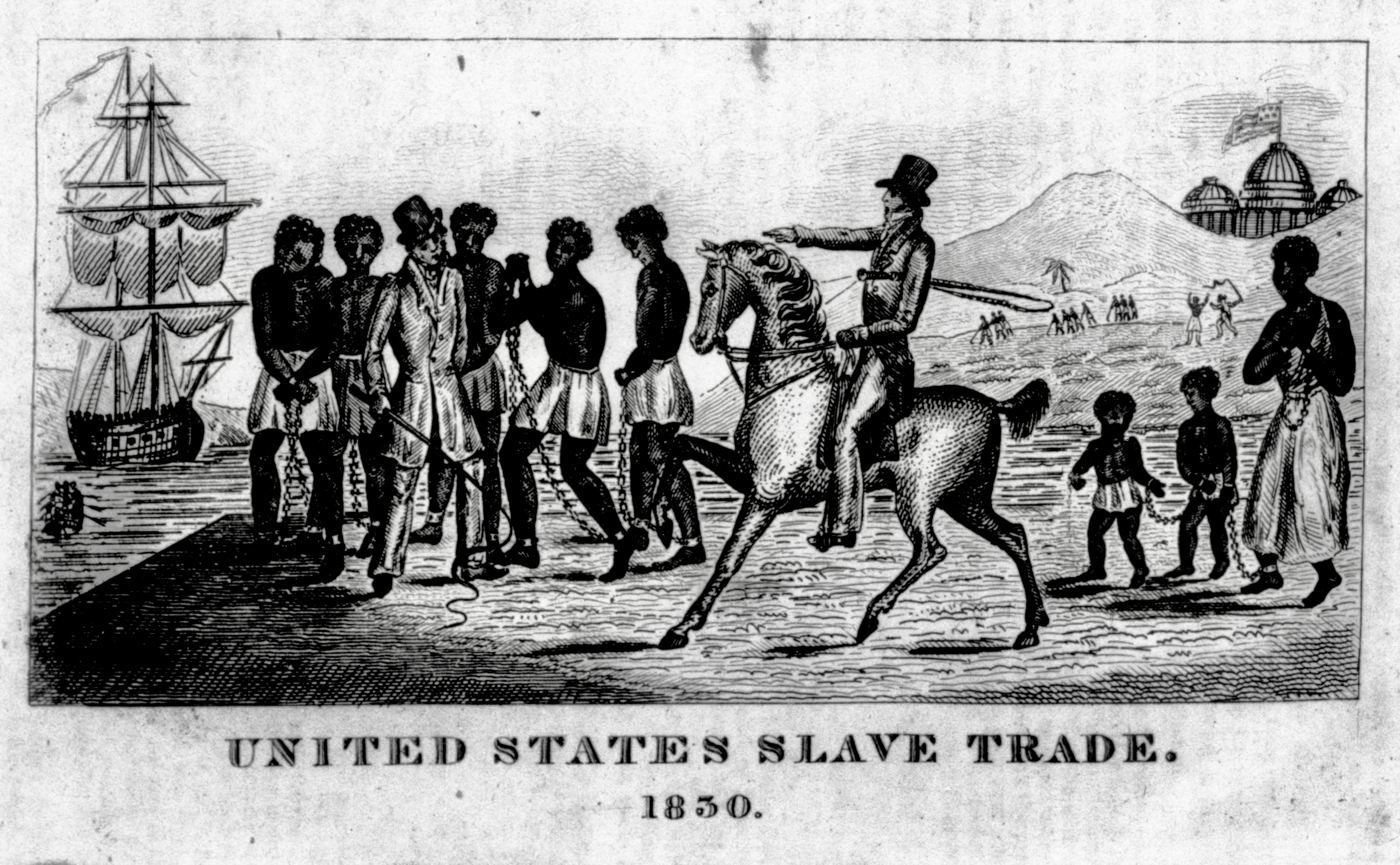
"United States Slave Trade 1830" from Benjamin Lundy's Genius of Universal Emancipation depicted the rise of the coastwise slave trade between the Chesapeake Bay and the Mississippi watershed

- C. S. Irvine, Greenville District, S.C.
- O. B. Irvine, Greenville District, S.C.
- Jackson, Alabama
- Andrew Jackson, Bruinsburg, Natchez District, Spanish West Florida (later Mississippi Territory), and John Hutchings
- John D. James, Thomas G. James, and David D. James, Nashville, Richmond, Va. and Natchez, Miss.
- Sam Jenkins, Prince Edward Co., Virginia
- William Jenkins, Nashville
- Thomas J. Jennings & Co., Hamburg, S.C.
- James Jervey, Charleston
- Johnson & Apperson
- Sherman Johnson, New Orleans
- Theodore Johnston, New Orleans
- Leroy Jones, Alexandria, Va.
- Jones & Robinson, Georgia
- Jones & Slater, Richmond, Va.

== K–L ==
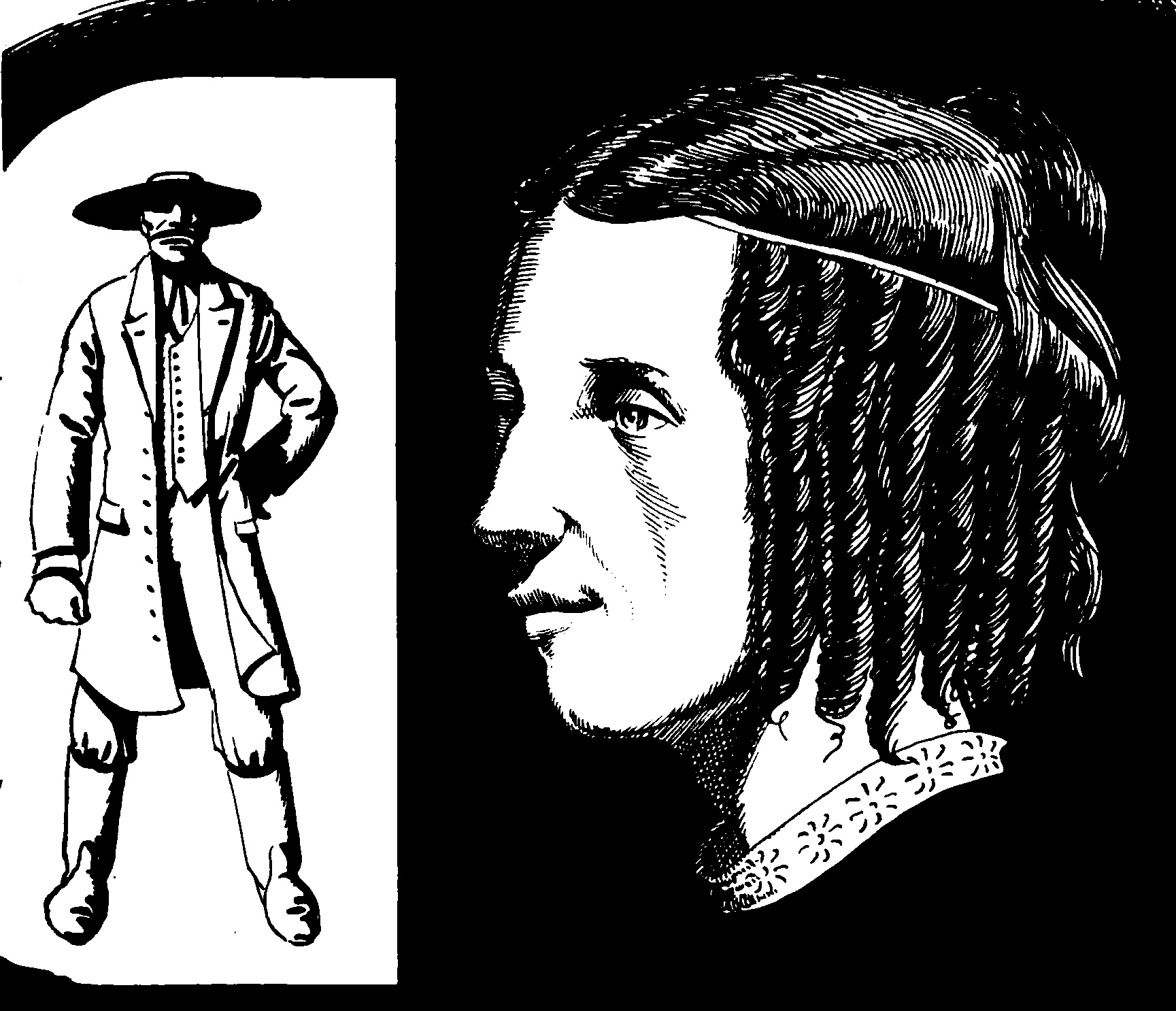
Leonard Everett Fisher illustration showing Mr. Haley, the slave trader character from Harriet Beecher Stowe's novel

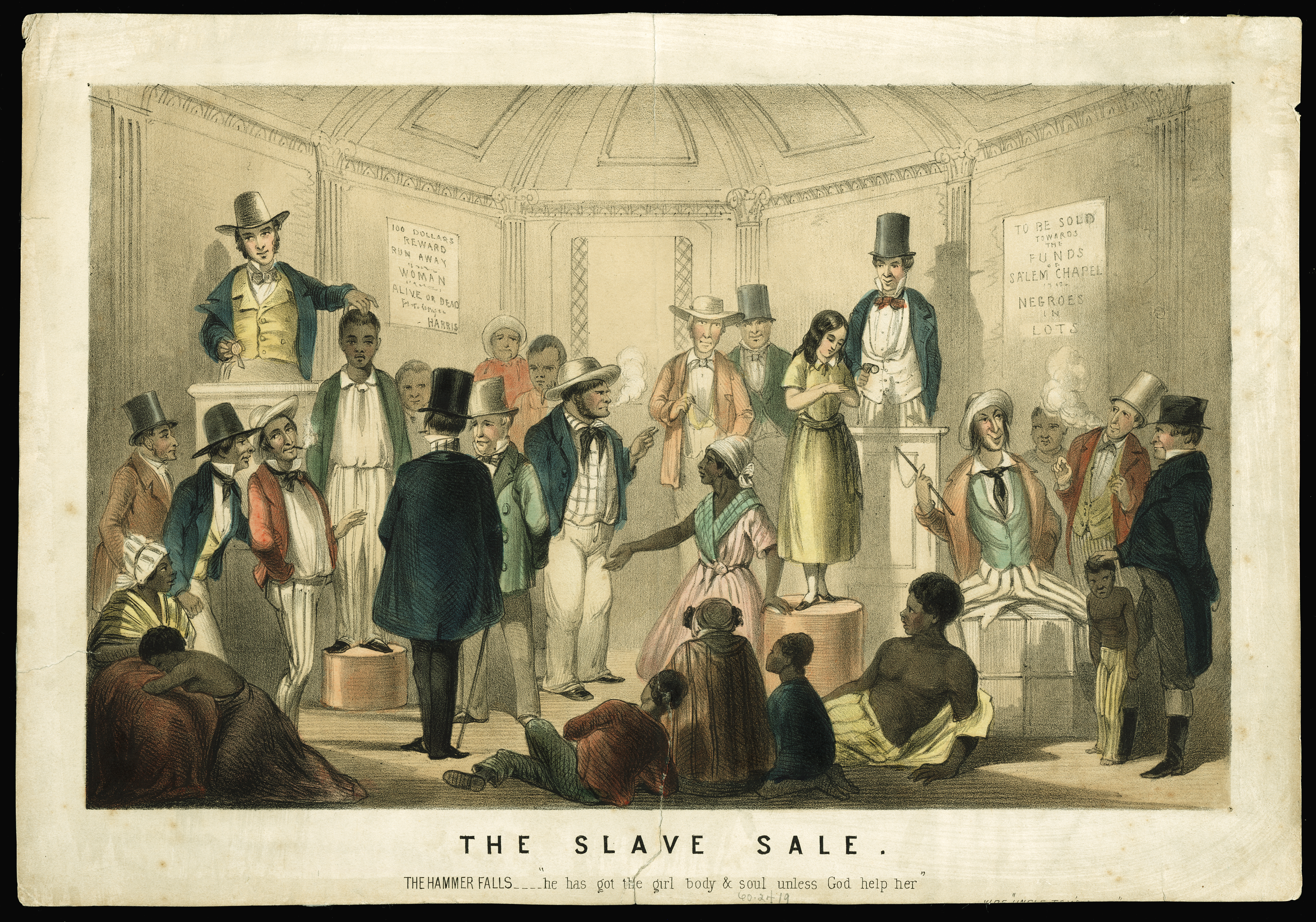
Lithographic illustration of chapter 30 from Uncle Tom's Cabin: "The Slave Warehouse"

- George T. Kausler, New Orleans
- Isreal Keels, King Street [Kingstree?], S.C. and Mississippi
- William H. Kelly, Louisville, Ky.
- James Kelly, Kentucky
- James Kemp
- Benjamin Kendig, New Orleans
- Bernard Kendig, New Orleans
- Edward J. Kendrick
- Henry Kennedy, New Orleans
- Duncan F. Kenner, New Orleans
- George Kephart, Maryland, Virginia, District of Columbia
- Simon Kern, Richmond
- Jesse Kirby and John Kirby, Virginia and Georgia
- Moses Kirkpatrick, New Orleans
- Charles Lamarque, New Orleans
- John Lane, Virginia and South Carolina
- Major Lane, New Orleans
- Larken Lynch, North Carolina and Virginia
- Henry Laurens, Charleston, S.C.
- Bert (or Bird) Leatherwood, Richmond and Mississippi
- N. M. Lee, Virginia
- Laferriere Levesque
- Mr. Leake, Virginia
- J. & L. T. Levin, Columbia, S.C.
- A. Lilly, New Orleans
- Benjamin Little, Montgomery Little, Chauncey Little & William Little, Memphis and Shelbyville, Tenn.
- L. Linder, New Orleans
- William Locket, New Orleans
- E. Loftin, New Orleans
- B. F. Logan, Caddo, La.
- Charles Logan
- R. W. Long, New Orleans
- R. W. Long & Mull
- John Lumpkins, Virginia
- Robert Lumpkin, Richmond
- Lumpkin & Jones
- Lumpkin & Locket
- Robert J. Lyles & George W. Hitching, Nashville and Sumner Co., Tenn.

== M, Mc ==
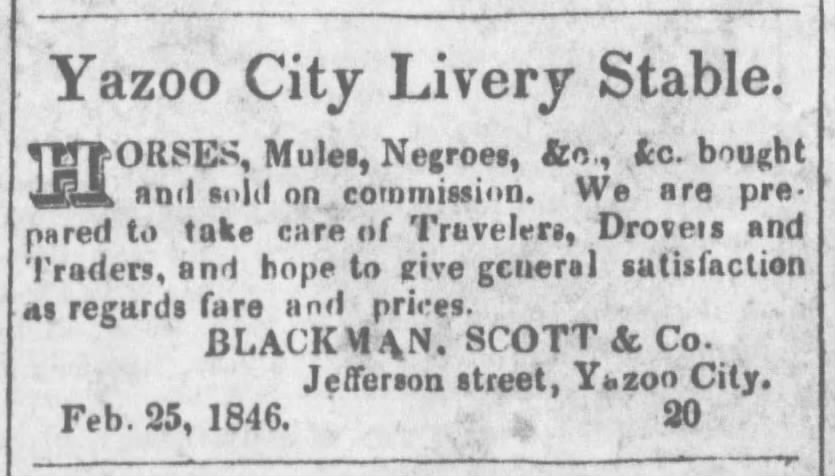
Frederic Bancroft noted that in many towns "the same man dealt in horses, mules and slaves." ("Yazoo City Livery Stable: Horses, Mules, Negroes, &c, &c. bought and sold on commission." The Yazoo Democrat, March 18, 1846)

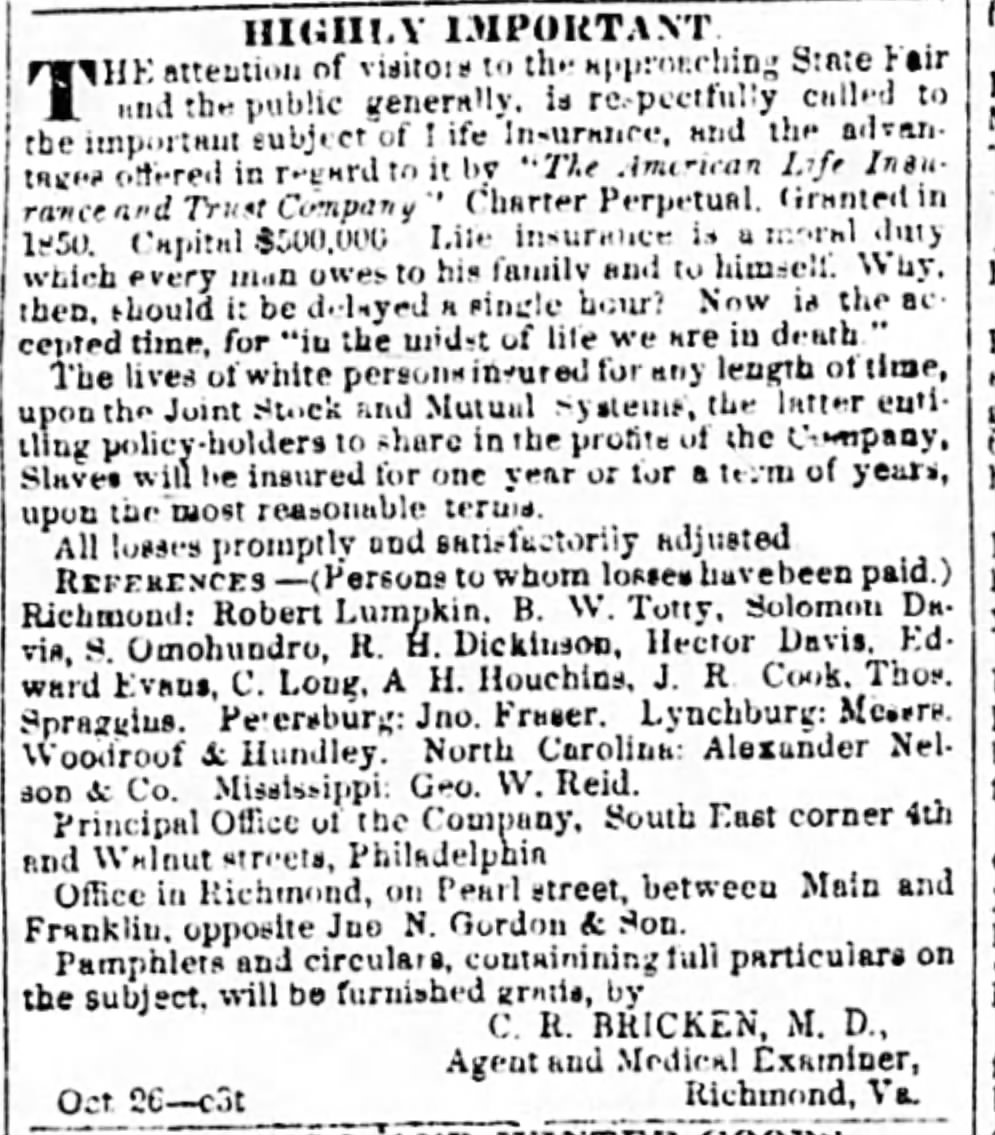
C. R. Bricken sold slave insurance, and listed a number of notable slave traders (including Seth Woodroof, Robert Lumpkin, Silas Omohundro, Hector Davis, Solomon Davis, and R. H. Dickinson) as references to whom "losses had been paid" (Richmond Enquirer, November 6, 1855)

- Macklevane, South Carolina
- Maddock, Tennessee
- John D. Mallory, Virginia and eastern Mississippi
- Josiah Maples, Memphis
- Silas Marshall & Bro., Lexington, Ky.
- John Martin
- W. B. Martin, New Orleans
- Masi & Bourk, New Orleans
- Matlock, Texas
- Mathews, New Orleans
- James G. Mathews, Louisville, Ky.
- Thomas E. Matthews, New Orleans
- John Mattingly, Louisville, Ky. and St. Louis, Mo.
- Mayer, Jacobe, & Co., Atlanta
- Michael McBride
- Thomas McCargo
- McCerran, Landry & Co., New Orleans
- McClaine, Virginia
- Mr. McClinton, Richmond
- David McDaniel, Virginia and Macon, Ga.
- H. J. McDaniel, Winchester, Va.
- McDonald, Virginia and Georgia
- Alexander McDonald and Hugh McDonald, Charleston
- Elijah McDowell, Charles Town, Va. and Winchester, Va.
- William McGee
- John M. McGehee & Thomas McGehee
- McLanahan and Bogart, New Orleans (principals: James McLanahan and Wilhelmus Bogart)
- A. A. McLean, Nashville
- J. B. McLendon, Lynchburg, Va.
- McKeller, Virginia or North Carolina?
- James McMillin, Kentucky
- Jesse Meek Jr., Washington, D.C. and Louisiana
- Joseph Meek, Nashville
- Meek, Logan, Haynes & Magee, Virginia and Mississippi
- Mellon, Alexandria, Va.
- R. H. Melton, Richmond and Louisiana
- L. D. Merrimon, also Merrimon & Clinkscales, Greenwood, S.C.
- William H. Merritt, New Orleans
- D. Middleton, New Orleans
- Ladson Mills, North Carolina and Mississippi
- Miller and Sutler
- James Miller, Virginia and east Tennessee
- James S. Moffett, Troy, Tenn.
- Soloman Moffitt, Port Gibson, Miss.
- Henry Millier & Co., New Orleans
- John S. Montmollin, Savannah
- Benjamin Mordecai
- Henry E. Moore, Plaquemine, Louisiana
- James Moore, Virginia and Alabama
- Peter Moore, Virginia
- William Moore, Carolinas
- Moore & Dawson, Richmond
- James T. Morris, Wilmington, N.C.
- Arthur Mosely, Virginia and Mississippi
- J. F. Moses, Lumpkin, Ga.
- Jean Baptiste Moussier, Richmond and New Orleans
- Dick Mulhundro, Virginia and Georgia
- Mullinnac

== N–O ==
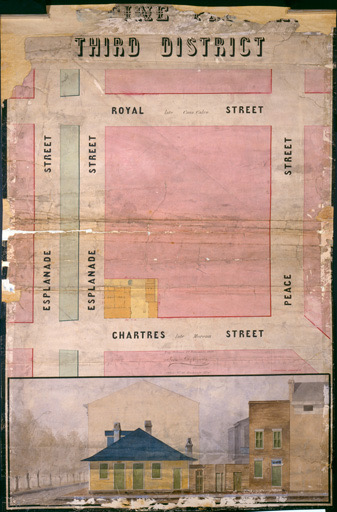
Traders including Shadrack F. Slatter, Walter L. Campbell, Joseph Bruin, and J. M. Wilson all used this site at Esplanade and Chartres (previously Moreau) in New Orleans at various times

- Thomas Napier, Macon, Ga.
- William Nedlock, Virginia
- Nelson & Cobb, South Carolina
- Isaac Neville, Memphis
- Julian Neville, New Orleans
- James Nichols, Halifax County, Va.
- Jack Nickols, Georgia and Alabama
- George Nickson, Virginia
- George Nixon, Carolinas, Georgia, Alabama
- G. H. Noel, Macon, Ga.
- George N. Noel, Memphis
- James G. Noel, Macon, Ga.
- Joe Norris, Georgia (?)
- Nowland, Virginia and Georgia
- Charles Nox, Natchez
- Nutwell
- Ziba B. Oakes, Charleston
- William Oldham, Natchez
- A. C. Omohundro & Co., Mississippi
- Silas Omohundro, Richmond
- A. J. Orr and D. W. Orr, Macon, Ga.
- Thomas Otey
- Overly & Saunders, Petersburg, Va.
- Thomas Overton, Maryland (?) and Louisiana (?)
- Owens, Natchez
- Abraham Owens, Halifax County, Va.
- Owings & Charles, New Orleans

== P ==
- Page, New Bern, N.C. and New Orleans
- Tom Pankey
- John Parks
- Benjamin Parks
- Edward A. Parker, Macon, Ga.
- James Parker, Dinwiddie County, Va.
- Paul Pascal
- Patton & Mossy, New Orleans
- Peck, Washington County, Ky.
- J. C. Peixotto, New Orleans
- Archibald Perkins, Virginia
- Henry F. Peterson, New Orleans
- John Parker Pettiway, New Orleans
- Isaac Phillips
- W. R. Phillips, Macon, Ga.
- G. B. Philippe
- George I. Pitts, Columbus, Ga.
- John J. Poindexter, New Orleans
- Thomas B. Poindexter, New Orleans and Mississippi
- Ponder, Richmond, Va., Florida, and Alabama
- Ephraim G. Ponder, Thomasville, Ga.
- Annie Poore, Georgia
- P. J. Porcher & Baya, Charleston (Philip Johnston Porcher & Hanero T. Baya)
- Thomas A. Powell, Louisville, Ky. and Montgomery, Ala. and St. Louis, and New Orleans, and Mississippi
- John B. Prentis, Virginia
- Price, Birch & Co., Alexandria, Va., principals J. C. Cook, Charles M. Price, George Kephart, William H. Birch
- William Price, Cumberland County, Virginia, and Mississippi
- Pryor
- William A. Pullum, Lexington, Ky.
- D. M. Pullium, Richmond, Va.
- Pullium & Co., Virginia
- Alexander Puryear
- R. C. Puryear
- Alexander Putney, North Carolina and Mississippi

== R ==
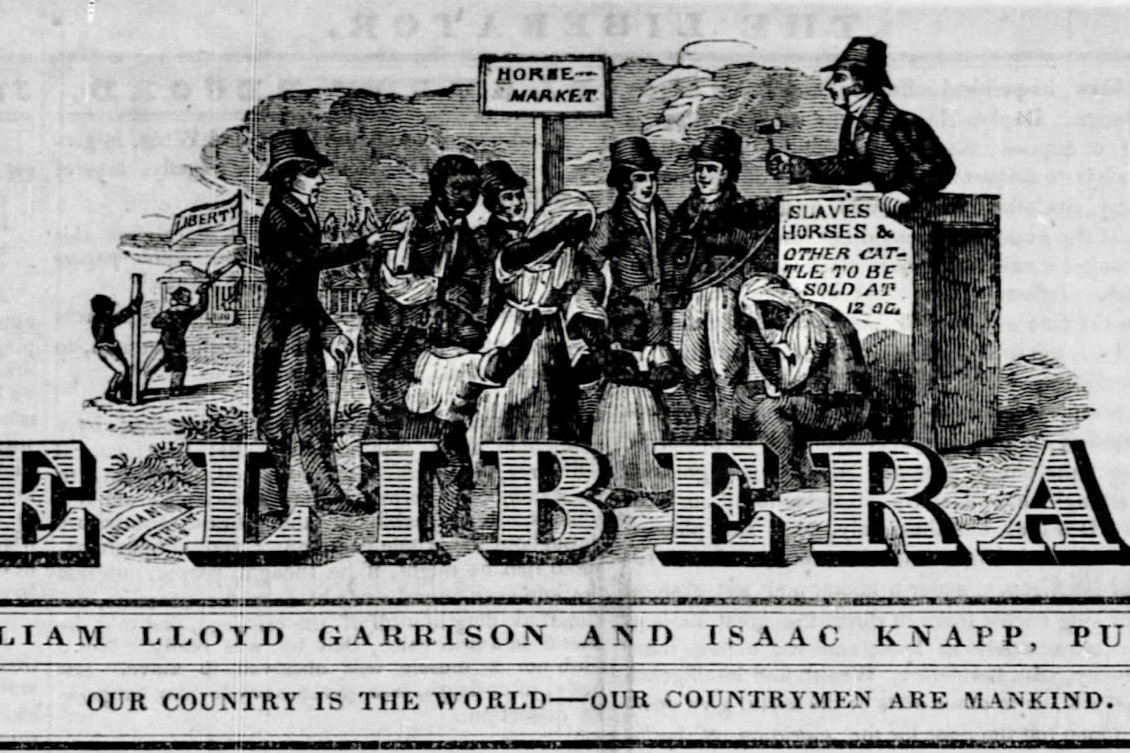
In 1831, the first title-band vignette for The Liberator depicted a slave auction under a horse market sign, a whipping post set up in front of the U.S. Capitol, and an Indian treaty discarded in the mud and forgotten

- Reuben Ragland, Petersburg, Va.
- John Rainey, Richmond, Va. and Louisiana
- John Rath, Smith Co., Tenn.
- Bernard Raux, Virginia
- Dr. Ray, Tennessee (?) and Mississippi
- R. D. P. Read, Lynchburg, Va.
- Redford and Kelly, Kentucky
- Thomas Redman
- Renshaw and Brady, Preston Co., Va.
- Reynolds, Louisville, Ky.
- Reynolds, Byrne, & Co., New Orleans
- Jesse Rice, Virginia
- Zachariah A. Rice, Atlanta, Ga.
- Charles Richards, Henry Co., Tenn.
- John S. Riggs, Charleston
- Thomas Ringgold IV, Chestertown, Maryland
- Alfred O. Robards, Kentucky
- Lewis C. Robards, Lexington, Ky.
- Robe & Anderson, Alabama
- Roberson, Maryland and South Carolina
- Roberson and Garrett, Richmond, Va. and Mississippi
- George Robertson and John Robertson, Virginia and New Orleans
- John Robertson, Mississippi and either New Orleans or Mobile
- Robinson, South Carolina and Georgia
- John Robinson, Georgia
- William Rochel, Virginia and Natchez
- Noah Rollins
- Richard Rolton
- Billy Ross, Virginia
- David Ross, Louisville, Ky.
- John M. Ross & Co., Clinton, Louisiana
- Rowan & Harris, Mississippi
- George Rust Jr.
- C. M. Rutherford, New Orleans
- E. M. Rutherford
- Thomas Ryan, Charleston

== S ==
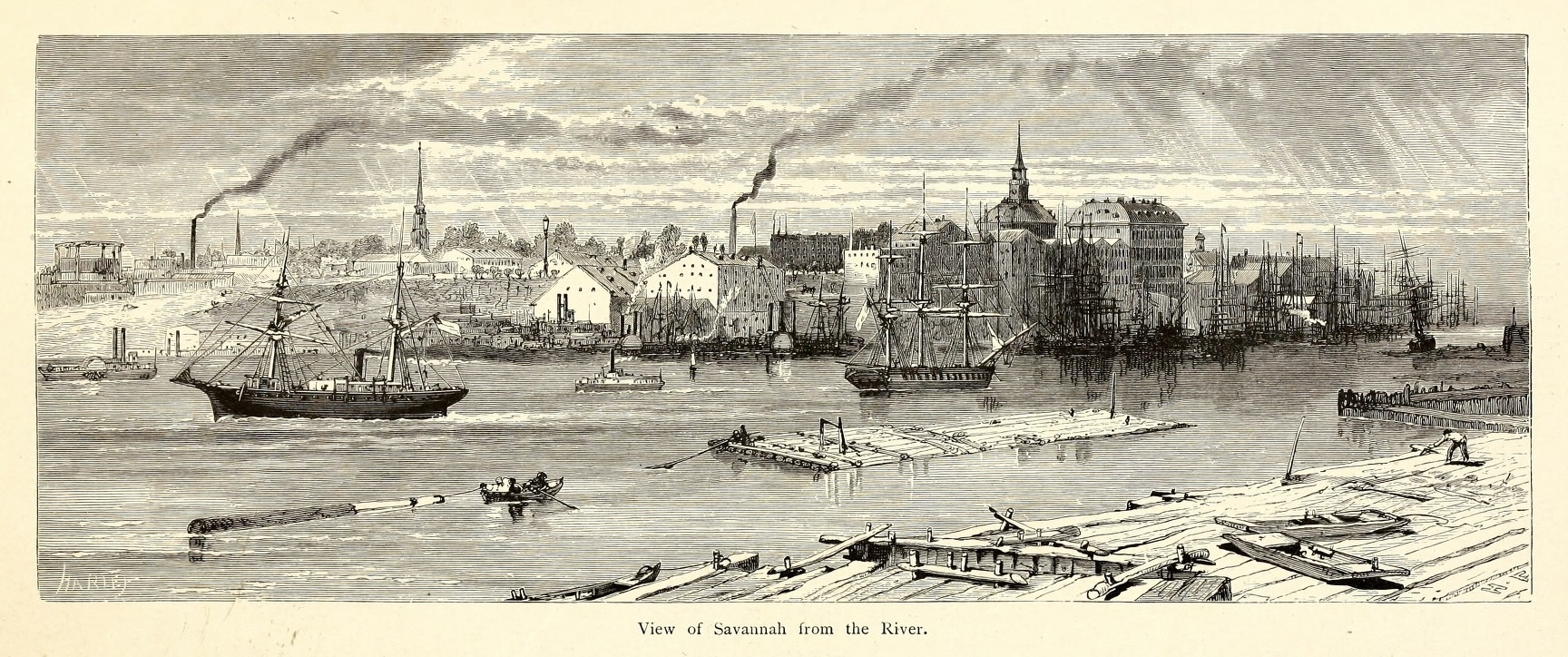
View of Savannah from the River (Picturesque America, 1872)

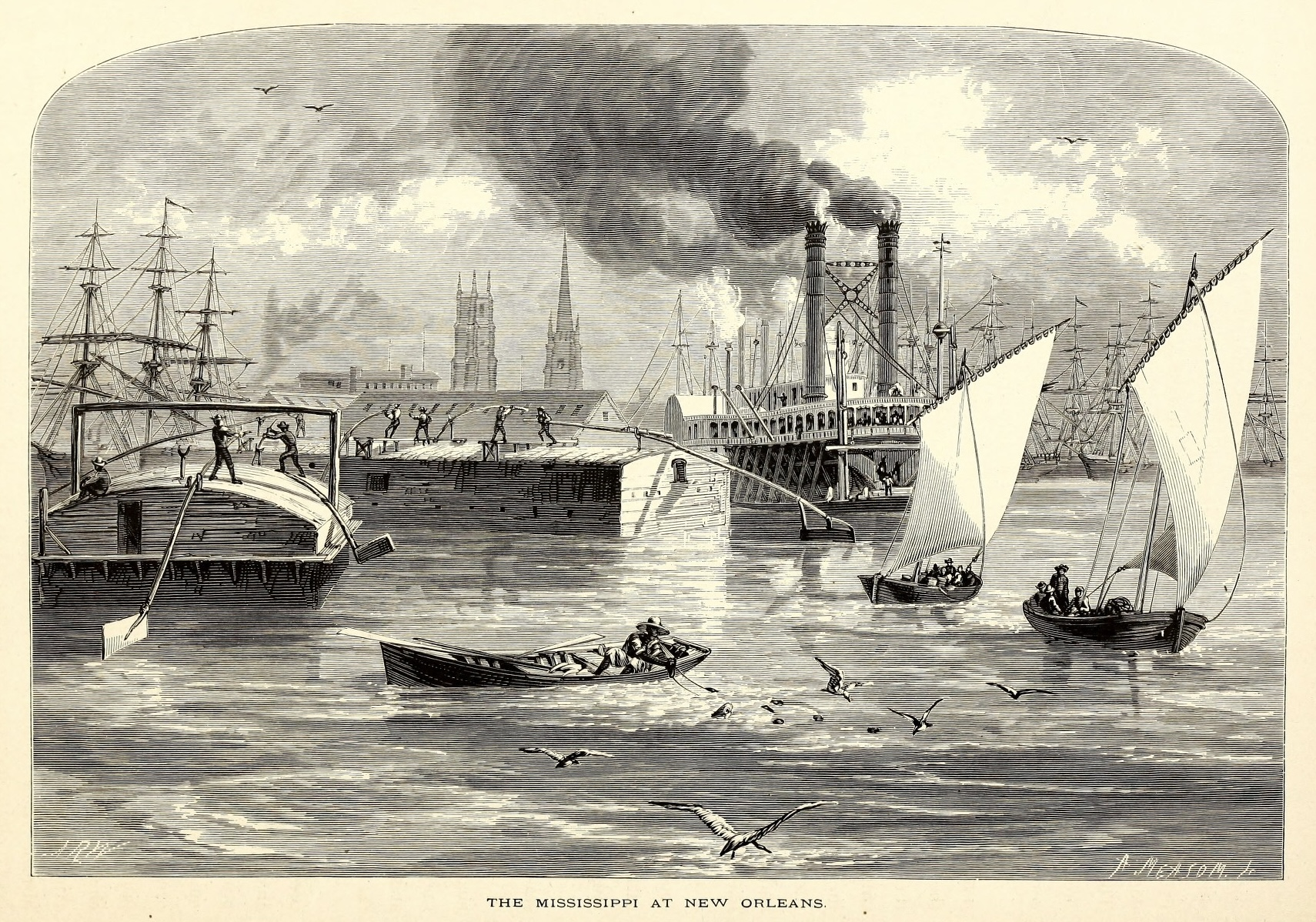
Flat-bottomed barges, sailboats, steamboats, and a fisherman's skiff on the Mississippi at New Orleans (Picturesque America, 1872)

- A. J. Salinas, Charleston
- Bob Sanders, Virginia and New Orleans
- Sanders & Foster
- Thomas Sanders, Washington County, Virginia, and Mississippi
- Jourdan M. Saunders, Warrenton, Va.
- A. C. Scott, Louisville, Ky.
- David Scott
- A. K. Seago, Atlanta, Ga.
- John Seymour, North Carolina and Georgia
- J. M. E. Sharp, Columbia, S.C.
- J. M. F. Sharp, New Orleans
- J. W. Sharp, New Orleans
- Lewis N. Shelton
- Shivers, of Virginia, the Carolinas, and Georgia
- Lee Shoot, Nashville
- E. H. Simmons, Virginia and Georgia
- R. W. Sinclair, Kentucky
- Henry F. Slatter, Baltimore and New Orleans
- Shadrack F. Slatter, New Orleans
- Robert Slaughter, Natchez, Miss.
- B. D. Smith, Atlanta, Ga.
- Benjamin Smith, Charleston, S.C.
- Gardner Smith & Co., New Orleans
- John B. Smith, New Orleans
- John W. Smith, Washington, D.C.
- Thomas Jefferson Smith
- William David Smith, South Carolina
- Smithers, Virginia
- Christopher T. Smithson, Virginia and "the lower country"
- Solomon, South Carolina
- Samuel Spears
- John Springs III, York District, S.C.
- William Stansberry, Kentucky and Mississippi
- John Staples, Memphis
- L. R. Starkes
- John Stickney, Louisville, Ky.
- E. H. Stokes, Virginia
- Mr. Stokes, North Carolina and Mississippi
- Edward Stone and Howard Stone, Bourbon County, Ky.
- Samuel Stone, Danville, Va.
- George Stovall, New Orleans
- Pleasant Stovall, Augusta, Ga.
- G. F. Stubbs, Macon, Ga.
- A. A. Suarez
- Sutler

== T–V ==
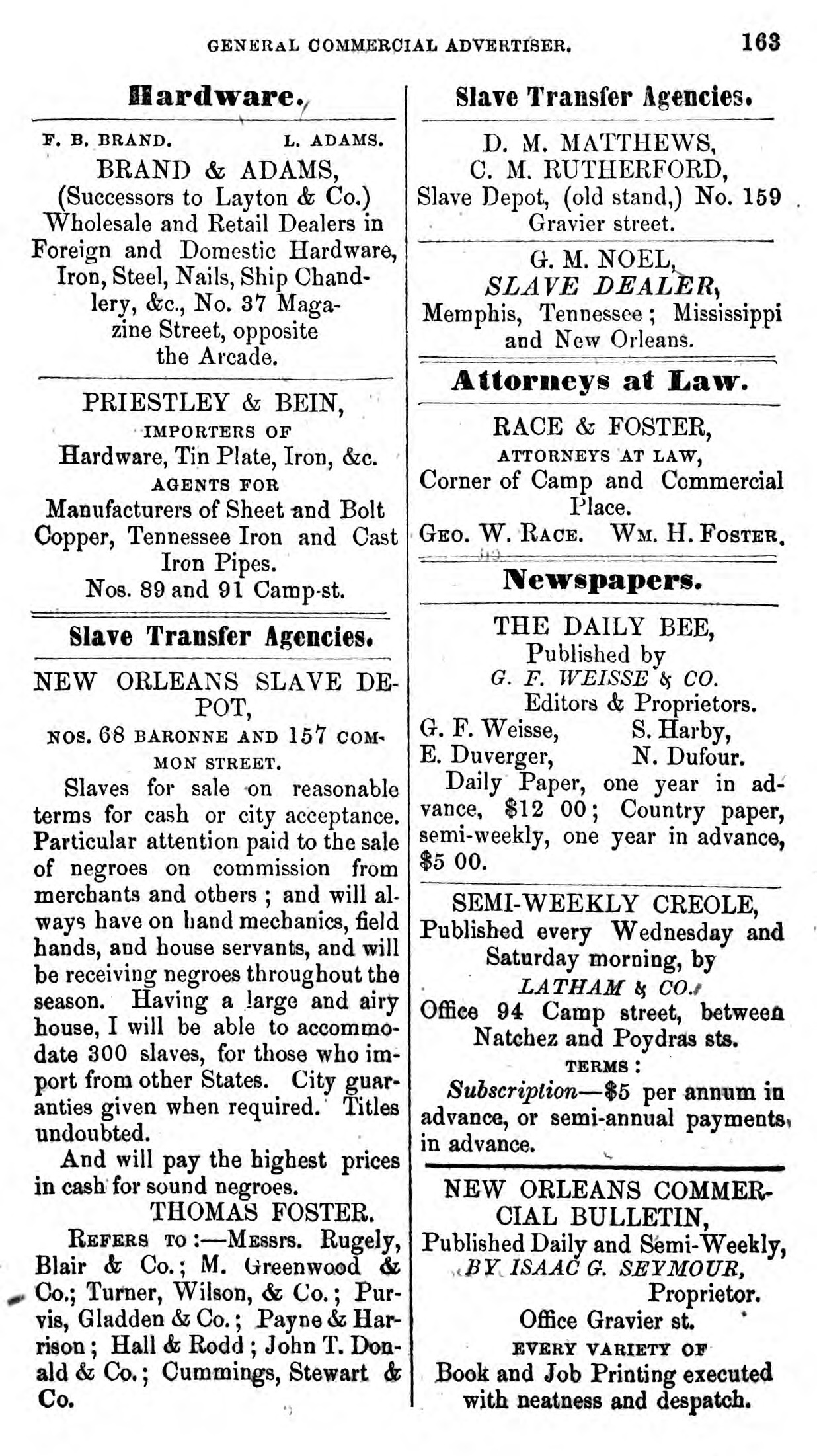
"Slave Transfer Agencies" listed in an 1854 Southern business directory, including Thomas Foster in New Orleans, a C. M. Rutherford partnership, and G. M. Noel in Memphis

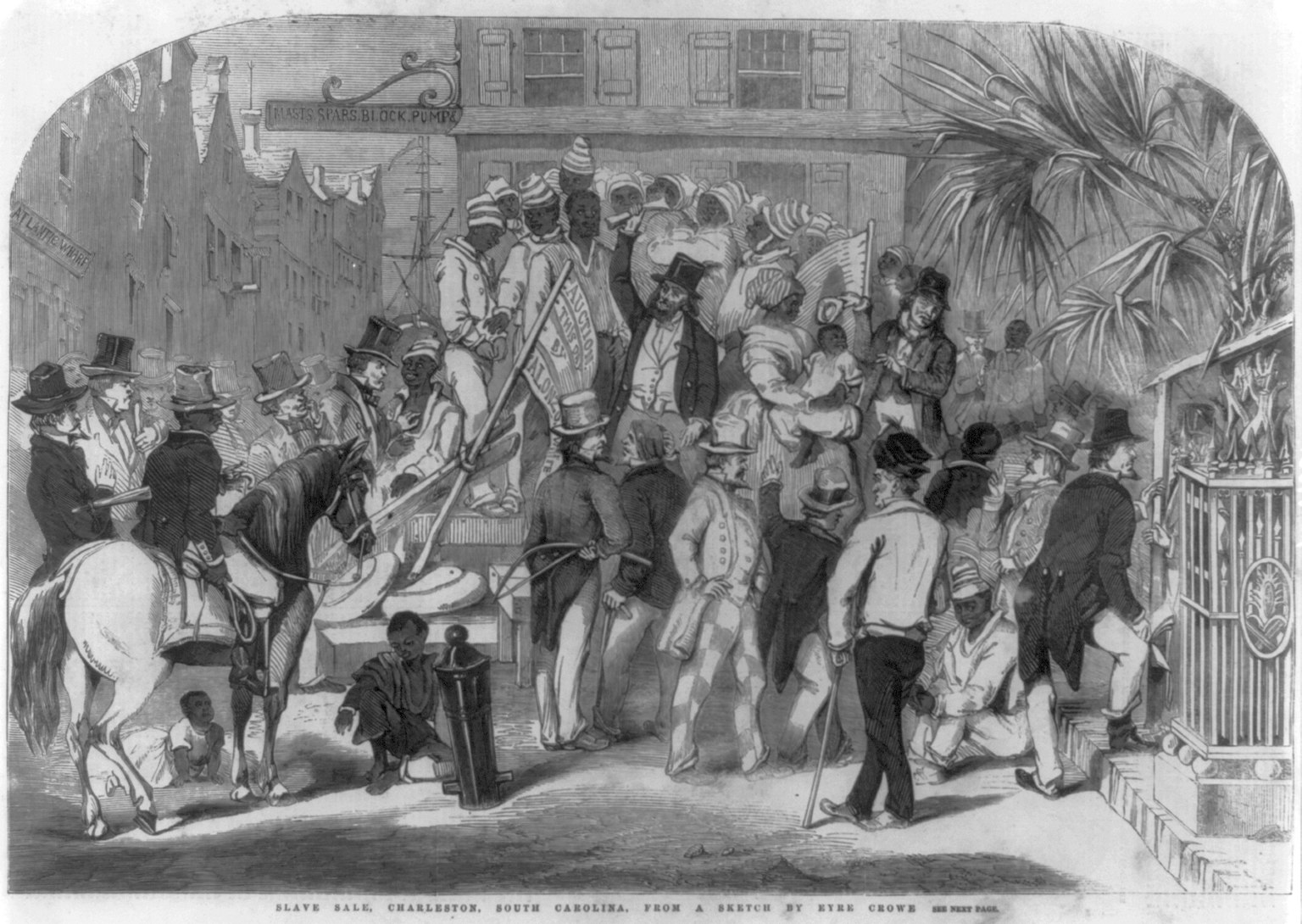
Eyre Crowe, "Slave sale, Charleston, S.C.," published in The Illustrated London News, Nov. 29, 1856: The flag tied to a post beside the steps reads "Auction This Day by Alonzo J. White". The other flag was rendered in red in a later oil painting of the same image. A red flag indicated to buyers that a slave sale was imminent. In 1856, Alonzo J. White, along with fellow slave traders Louis D. DeSaussure and Ziba B. Oakes, opposed a new South Carolina law requiring that slave sales take place indoors rather than on the streets. Their argument was that the law was "an impolitic admission that would give 'strength to the opponents of slavery' and 'create among some portions of the community a doubt as to the moral right of slavery itself.'"

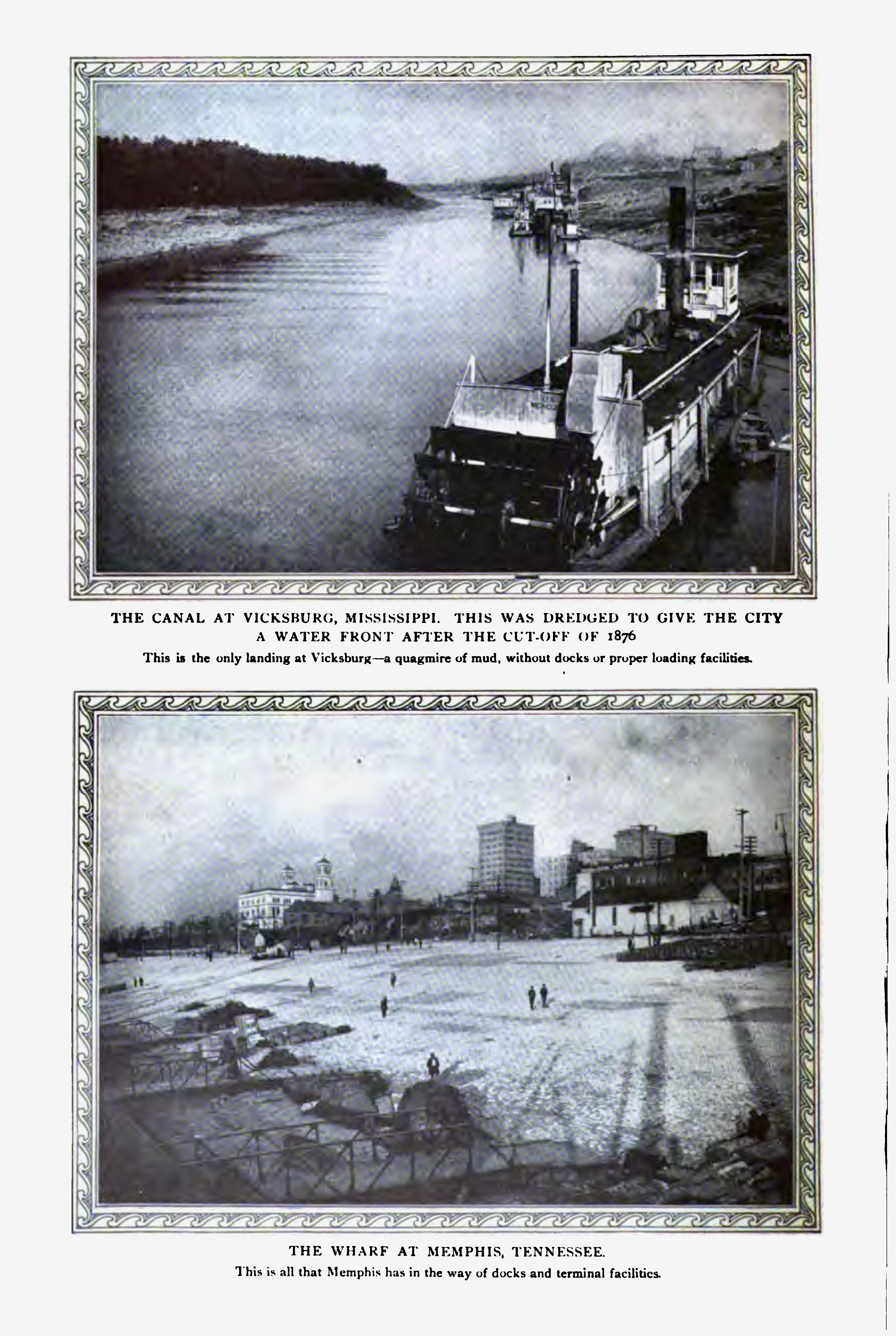
Boat landings at Vicksburg and Memphis photographed c. 1913, perhaps looking not so different from how they looked in their days as hubs of the interstate slave trade

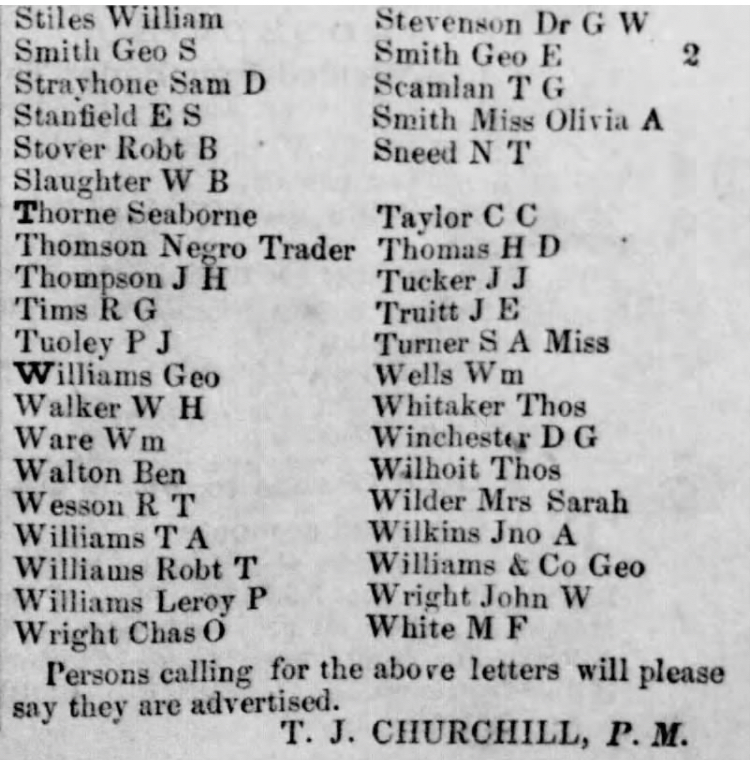
"Thomson Negro Trader" had mail waiting for him in Little Rock, Arkansas, in November 1859

- John and Philip E. Tabb, Norfolk, Va.
- Bacon Tait, Virginia
- Tait & Garland, Virginia and Mississippi
- Talbot, New Orleans
- William F. Talbott, Louisville, Ky. and New Orleans
- James Tarbe, New Orleans (?)
- Tannehill, New Orleans
- H. & J. W. Taylor, Clinton, La.
- Humphrey Taylor, Virginia and Huntsville, Ala.
- J. T. Taylor, New Orleans
- John Taylor, Tennessee and South Carolina
- H. N. Templeman
- Terry, Virginia
- Henry Teuker, Virginia and Georgia
- Harris Tharp
- Philip Thomas
- Sidney Thomas, Virginia
- Thompson, near Nashville, Tennessee
- Mr. Thompson, Baltimore and the lands of the Cherokee nation
- Joseph Thompson, Louisiana
- Thomson, Little Rock, Arkansas
- John Thornton, South Carolina and Dalton, Ga.
- Todd
- John Toler
- Clement Townsend
- Thomas P. Trotter
- N. C. Trowbridge, Augusta, Ga. & Hamburg, S.C.
- Tom Tucker, Knoxville, Tenn.
- Thomas Tunno and John Price, Charleston
- Mr. Turner, Natchez
- Mr. Turner, Virginia
- Allen Vance
- James Vanclevy, Charleston and Texas
- Vanhook, Tennessee
- Vaughan, Virginia
- Norbert Vignié, New Orleans

== W–Y ==
- Wadkins, Virginia and Georgia
- Charles Waley, Potomac River and Natchez
- Mat Warner, Virginia and Georgia
- Walker, Virginia and North Carolina
- Walker, Virginia and Tuscumbia, Ala.
- Ben Walker
- A. Wallace, Memphis
- J. D. Ware, Memphis
- Morton Waring, Charleston
- Warwick, Nashville
- William Watkins, Atlanta, Ga.
- William T. Watkins
- Watley, Richmond and near Auburn, Ala.
- J. Watson, Louisville, Ky.
- Richard Watson, Louisville, Ky. and New Orleans
- Addison Weathers
- Webb, Merrill & Co., Nashville
- A. Weisemann, New Orleans
- Joseph A. Weatherly
- Thomas C. Weatherly, South Carolina
- Weatherby, Augusta, Ga.
- Mr. Wetherby, Mississippi
- James Whidby
- Alonzo J. White, Charleston
- James White, New Orleans
- John White
- John R. White, St. Louis and New Orleans
- Maunsel White & Co., New Orleans
- Frank Whiterspoon, Missouri and Tennessee
- Joseph A. Whitaker, Rosehill, N.C.
- Whitaker & Turner, Atlanta, Ga.
- Theodore A. Whitney, Charleston
- Wilbur & Son, Charleston
- Wilkins, Virginia
- James P. Wilkinson
- David Williams and "Docr. flowers"
- Lewis E. Williams, Campbell Co., Va.
- Stokely Williams, Richmond
- Williams & Glover, Nashville
- Capt. Williamson, Virginia and Selma, Ala.
- Thomas Taylor Williamson, South Carolina and Louisiana
- James B. Williamson
- William Williamson
- J. M. Wilson, Baltimore and New Orleans
- Jerry Wilson, Tennessee
- William Winbush, Virginia
- Winston & Dixon, Georgia
- David Wise, New Orleans
- William Witherspoon, Memphis
- Joseph Woods
- Seth Woodroof, Lynchburg, Va.
- Joseph B. Woolfolk, Eastern Shore, Maryland, and Natchez
- Samuel Martin Woolfolk, Baltimore, New Orleans, and Natchez
- Woolfolk
- Woolfolks, Sanders & Overley (Richard Woolfolk, Robert Sanders, and Thomas W. Overley)
- George Wylly, Savannah
- Mr. Wythe
- Absolom Yancey
- Charles Yancey and Jackson Yancey, Norfolk, Va. and Oxford, N.C.
- Mr. Yeatman, Virginia
- Charles Young, New Orleans
- J. Winbush Young, Virginia

== See also ==
- List of Alabama slave traders
- List of District of Columbia slave traders
- List of Georgia and Florida slave traders
- List of Kentucky slave traders
- List of Maryland and Delaware slave traders
- List of Mississippi slave traders
- List of Missouri and Arkansas slave traders
- List of North Carolina slave traders
- List of Rhode Island slave traders
- List of Tennessee slave traders
- List of Texas slave traders
- Family separation in American slavery
- List of largest slave sales in the United States
- Movement to reopen the transatlantic slave trade
- Kidnapping into slavery in the United States
- Bibliography of the slave trade in the United States
- Slave markets and slave jails in the United States

== Sources ==
- Ball, Edward (2014) [1998]. Slaves in the Family. Macmillan. ISBN 9780374534455. LCCN 97034640.
- Bancroft, Frederic (2023) [1931]. Slave Trading in the Old South. Southern Classics Series. Introduction by Michael Tadman. University of South Carolina Press. ISBN 978-1-64336-427-8.
- Bellamy, Donnie D. (1984). "Macon, Georgia, 1823–1860: A Study in Urban Slavery". Phylon. 45 (4): 298–310. doi:10.2307/274910. JSTOR 274910.
- Calderhead, William (1977). "The Role of the Professional Slave Trader in a Slave Economy: Austin Woolfolk, A Case Study". Civil War History. 23 (3): 195–211. doi:10.1353/cwh.1977.0041. ISSN 1533-6271. S2CID 143907436.
- Carey, Bill (2018). Runaways, Coffles and Fancy Girls: A History of Slavery in Tennessee. Nashville, Tennessee: Clearbrook Press. ISBN 978-0-9725680-4-3. LCCN 2018903570. OCLC 1045068878.
- Colby, Robert K. D. (2024). An Unholy Traffic: Slave Trading in the Civil War South. Oxford University Press. doi:10.1093/oso/9780197578261.001.0001. ISBN 9780197578285. LCCN 2023053721. OCLC 1412042395.
- Fitzpatrick, Benjamin Lewis (December 2008). Negroes for Sale: The Slave Trade in Antebellum Kentucky (Ph.D. thesis). University of Notre Dame. doi:10.7274/pn89d50750n.
- Garrett, Franklin M. (2011) [1954]. Atlanta and Environs: A Chronicle of Its People and Events, 1820s–1870s (Reprint ed.). University of Georgia Press. ISBN 9780820339023.
- Friedman, Saul (2017). Jews and the American Slave Trade. Routledge. ISBN 9781351510769.
- Gudmestad, Robert (1999). A Troublesome Commerce: The Interstate Slave Trade, 1808–1840 (Doctor of Philosophy thesis). Louisiana State University and Agricultural & Mechanical College. doi:10.31390/gradschool_disstheses.6941.
- Head, David (2013). "Slave Smuggling by Foreign Privateers: The Illegal Slave Trade and the Geopolitics of the Early Republic". Journal of the Early Republic. 33 (3): 433–462. doi:10.1353/jer.2013.0061. ISSN 0275-1275. JSTOR 24487048.
- Hedrick, Charles Embury (1927). Social and Economic Aspects of Slavery in the Transmontane Prior to 1850. George Peabody College for Teachers. Contributions to education.no. 46. Nashville, Tennessee: George Peabody College for Teachers.
- James, D. Clayton (1993) [1968]. Antebellum Natchez. Baton Rouge, Louisiana: Louisiana State University Press. ISBN 978-0-8071-1860-3. LCCN 68028496. OCLC 28281641.
- Jay, William (1844). A View of the Action of the Federal Government, In Behalf of Slavery. Utica, N.Y.: J.C. Jackson.
- Johnson, Walter (2013). River of Dark Dreams: Slavery and Empire in the Cotton Kingdom. Cambridge: Belknap Press of Harvard University Press. ISBN 9780674074880. LCCN 2012030065. OCLC 827947225. OL 26179618M.
- Johnson, Walter (2009). Soul by Soul: Life Inside the Antebellum Slave Market. Cambridge: Harvard University Press. ISBN 9780674039155. OCLC 923120203.
- Jones-Rogers, Stephanie E. (2019). They Were Her Property: White Women as Slave Owners in the American South. New Haven, Connecticut: Yale University Press. ISBN 978-0-300-21866-4.
- Kendall, John S. (January 1939). "Shadow Over the City". The Louisiana Historical Quarterly. 22 (1). New Orleans: Louisiana Historical Society: 142–165. ISSN 0095-5949. OCLC 1782268. LDS Film 1425689, Image Group Number (DGS) 1640025 – via FamilySearch Digital Library.
- Kytle, Ethan J.; Roberts, Blain (2018). Denmark Vesey's garden: slavery and memory in the cradle of the Confederacy. New York: The New Press. ISBN 9781620973660. LCCN 2017041546.
- Libby, David J. (2004). Slavery and Frontier Mississippi, 1720–1835. University Press of Mississippi. ISBN 1-57806-599-2.
- Menck, Mary (2017). The Devil's Backbone: Race, Space, and Nation-Building on the Natchez Trace (M.A. thesis). Medford, Massachusetts: Tufts University.
- Mooney, Chase C. (1971) [1957]. "Chapter Two: Hire, Sale, Theft and Flight of Slaves". Slavery in Tennessee. Westport, Conn.: Negro Universities Press. pp. 29–63. ISBN 978-0-8371-5522-7.
- Phillips, U. Bonnell (1936) [1918]. American Negro slavery: a survey of the supply, employment and control of Negro labor as determined by the plantation régime. New York: D. Appleton and Company.
- Rothman, Adam (2005). Slave Country: American Expansion and the Origins of the Deep South. Harvard University Press. doi:10.4159/9780674042919. ISBN 978-0-674-04291-9. LCCN 2004057658. OCLC 56191767.
- Schermerhorn, Calvin (2015). The business of slavery and the rise of American capitalism, 1815–1860. New Haven, Conn.: Yale University Press. ISBN 978-0-300-19200-1.
- Schermerhorn, Calvin (2016). "Chapter 10. The Coastwise Slave Trade and a Mercantile Community of Interest". In Rockman, Seth Edward; Beckert, Sven (eds.). Slavery's Capitalism: A New History of American Economic Development. Early American Studies. Philadelphia: University of Pennsylvania Press. pp. 209–224. doi:10.9783/9780812293098-011. ISBN 978-0-8122-4841-8. JSTOR j.ctt1dfnrs7. LCCN 2016304619. OCLC 945028802.
- Sellers, James Benson (2015) [1950]. "Chapter 5: Traffic in Slaves". Slavery in Alabama. Library of Alabama Classics. Introduction by Harriet E. Amos Doss. Tuscaloosa: University of Alabama Press. ISBN 9780817389147. LCCN 50004433. OCLC 899157440.
- Stowe, Harriet Beecher (1853). A key to Uncle Tom's cabin: presenting the original facts and documents upon which the story is founded. Boston: J. P. Jewett & Co. LCCN 02004230. OCLC 317690900. OL 21879838M.
- Sydnor, Charles S. (1933). Slavery in Mississippi. American Historical Association, Carnegie Corporation of New York. New York: D. Appleton-Century Co. LCCN 33033678. OCLC 1968805.
- Williams, Jennie K. (April 2, 2020). "Trouble the water: The Baltimore to New Orleans coastwise slave trade, 1820–1860". Slavery & Abolition. 41 (2): 275–303. doi:10.1080/0144039X.2019.1660509. ISSN 0144-039X. S2CID 203494471.
- Wilson, Carol (2009) [1994]. Freedom at Risk: The Kidnapping of Free Blacks in America, 1780–1865. University Press of Kentucky. ISBN 9780813149790. JSTOR j.ctt130j5m9. LCCN 93021012. OCLC 900344359.
