= List of North Carolina slave traders =

This is a list of slave traders operating in the U.S. state of North Carolina from settlement until 1865.

- Dr. James Alston
- Baget & King
- Briggs, Cleveland County and Alabama
- Carson, North Carolina (?)
- Charles Carson & Smith, Burke County and New Orleans
- James Davis, North Carolina (?)
- English, North Carolina and Mississippi
- Elias Ferguson
- Obadiah Fields
- H. Forsyth, Statesville
- Lewis Garland
- Garret
- James Gladiss
- Tyre Glen, North Carolina (?)
- Alla Bam Bill Haden, North Carolina, Alabama, and Texas
- Bob Henry
- Heway, North Carolina and Alabama
- Alex. Hopkin, North Carolina and Georgia
- Howard, Chapel Hill, and Virginia
- James Huie and Josiah Huie, Rowan County
- Bob Huay, North Carolina
- Tillman (or Tilmon, Tilman, Tilghman) Hunt, North Carolina
- Samuel Hunter, Maryland and Guilford County
- Barnabas Ivy, Duplin County
- Larken Lynch, North Carolina and Virginia
- Henry Long, Person County
- J. A. McArthur, Clinton
- Spruce McCurry, Jerry Addison, and Add March, Davidson County and Memphis
- John McKane, North Carolina and Alabama
- D. McKay
- McKeller, Virginia or North Carolina?
- Ladson Mills, North Carolina and Mississippi
- Mr. Nash, Caswell County or Rockingham County
- Nelson, Hertford County
- Alexander Nelson, Guilford County
- Page, New Bern and New Orleans
- Everett Peterson, Clinton
- Joe Poindexter
- Capt. Poll, Maryland and North Carolina
- A. S. C. Powell, Clinton
- Luke Powell, Clinton
- Alexander Putney, North Carolina and Mississippi
- Col. Allen Rogers, Wake County
- John R. Sedgwick
- William Simpson
- David J. Southerland, Wilmington
- Charles T. Stevens, Clinton
- Mr. Stokes, North Carolina and Mississippi
- Tisdale, Nash County
- William Tisdale, North Carolina
- Tomkins
- Walker, Virginia and North Carolina
- Whitfield, North Carolina
- Thomas Woods, North Carolina and Mississippi
- Charles Yancey and Jackson Yancey, Virginia and North Carolina

== See also ==
- List of slave traders of the United States
- Family separation in American slavery
- List of largest slave sales in the United States
- Movement to reopen the transatlantic slave trade
- Kidnapping into slavery in the United States
- Bibliography of the slave trade in the United States
- Slave markets and slave jails in the United States
- List of South Carolina slave traders

== Sources ==
- Colby, Robert K. D. (2024). An Unholy Traffic: Slave Trading in the Civil War South. Oxford University Press. doi:10.1093/oso/9780197578261.001.0001. ISBN 9780197578285. LCCN 2023053721. OCLC 1412042395.
- Jones-Rogers, Stephanie E. (2019). They Were Her Property: White Women as Slave Owners in the American South. New Haven, Connecticut: Yale University Press. ISBN 978-0-300-21866-4.
- Sellers, James Benson (2015) [1950]. "Chapter 5: Traffic in Slaves". Slavery in Alabama. Library of Alabama Classics. Introduction by Harriet E. Amos Doss. Tuscaloosa: University of Alabama Press. ISBN 9780817389147. LCCN 50004433. OCLC 899157440.
- Sydnor, Charles S. (1933). Slavery in Mississippi. American Historical Association, Carnegie Corporation of New York. New York: D. Appleton-Century Co. LCCN 33033678. OCLC 1968805.
