= Josiah Maples =

American planter and slave trader (~1819–1876)

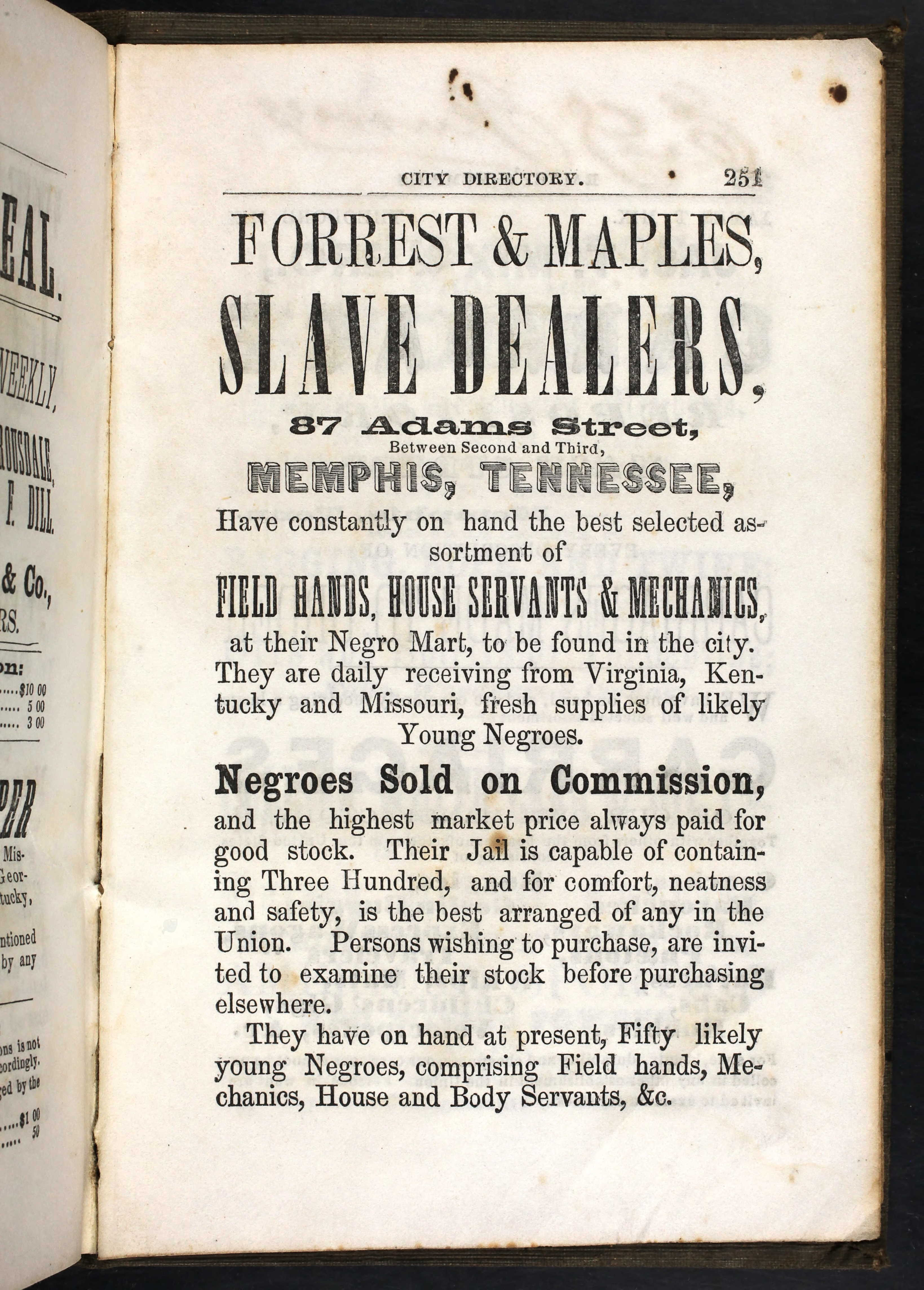
- Ad for Forrest & Maples in the 1855 Memphis city directory
- Born: c. 1819; Alabama Territory or Alabama, U.S.
- Died: September 22, 1876; Raleigh, Memphis, Tennessee, U.S.
- Occupations: American planter and slave trader

Josiah Maples (c. 1819 – September 22, 1876) was a 19th-century cotton plantation owner, bank director, and slave trader of Tennessee, Mississippi, and Arkansas in the United States (and the Confederate States during the American Civil War). Maples is notable as a slave-trading business partner of Nathan Bedford Forrest.

== Biography ==
Josiah Maples was born in Alabama in approximately 1818 or 1820. In July 1849 Maples was appointed to a "committee of twenty" in DeSoto County, Mississippi, that produced a resolution that opposed the Wilmot Proviso, protested northern aggression, and "Resolved, 5th. That while we cherish for the Union a lasting and warm regard, yet, we are not to be frightened from maintaining our just rights by being taunted with the name of disunionist feeling that whatever may be the result of this agitation it is chargeable not only on us who only stand on our rights under the constitution, but on those who have on this subject violated every guaranty of that sacred instrument." In 1851 Maples was the treasurer of the Masonic Lodge in DeSoto County. In 1852 the sheriff of Shelby County, Tennessee, reported that his jail held a 23-year-old runaway slave named Philip, "5 feet, 6 or 7 inches high, weighs about 140 pounds; belongs to Josiah Maples, of De Soto county, Miss." On or about October 1, 1853, Maples married Mary A. Marshall in Fayette County, Tennessee. On July 15, 1854, Maples patented 40 acres of land in Cherokee County, Alabama.

Maples was one of three major business partners of slave trader Nathan Bedford Forrest, along with (serially, not simultaneously) Seaborne S. Jones and Byrd Hill. (Forrest's five brothers also worked in the business.) According to a history of DeSoto County, Mississippi produced by the WPA in the late 1930s, "An interesting fact concerning Gen. Forrest, related by [Anna Maples of Olive Branch, Mississippi], was his having worked for Josiah Maples in his youth, on the old Evans place, a few miles from Pleasant Hill". Maples and Forrest were in business together as Forrest & Maples from July 1854 to December 31, 1855. In November 1854 they sold a nine-year-old girl named Page to Lavinia and Lemuel Smith for $600. On July 9, 1855, they sold Adisson, age 22, to V. Beckworth for $1,000. Also in 1855, Forrest & Maples sold Mary, age 15, for $800. On New Year's 1856 the Maples and Forrest partnership was dissolved.

At the time of the 1860 U.S. federal census, Maples, occupation "planter," with personal property valued at $10,000, lived in Redfork Township, Desha County, Arkansas, in a household shared with an overseer, a housekeeper, and their respective families. The slave schedules show that 70 enslaved people worked on Maples' plantation. In March 1861, Maples was elected a director of the Bank of West Tennessee. During the American Civil War he sold some cotton that was later partially burned by Union troops; there was a lawsuit. The case Butler v. Maples "established that buying cotton through an insurrectionary area through an agent licensed by the Treasury Department was legal".

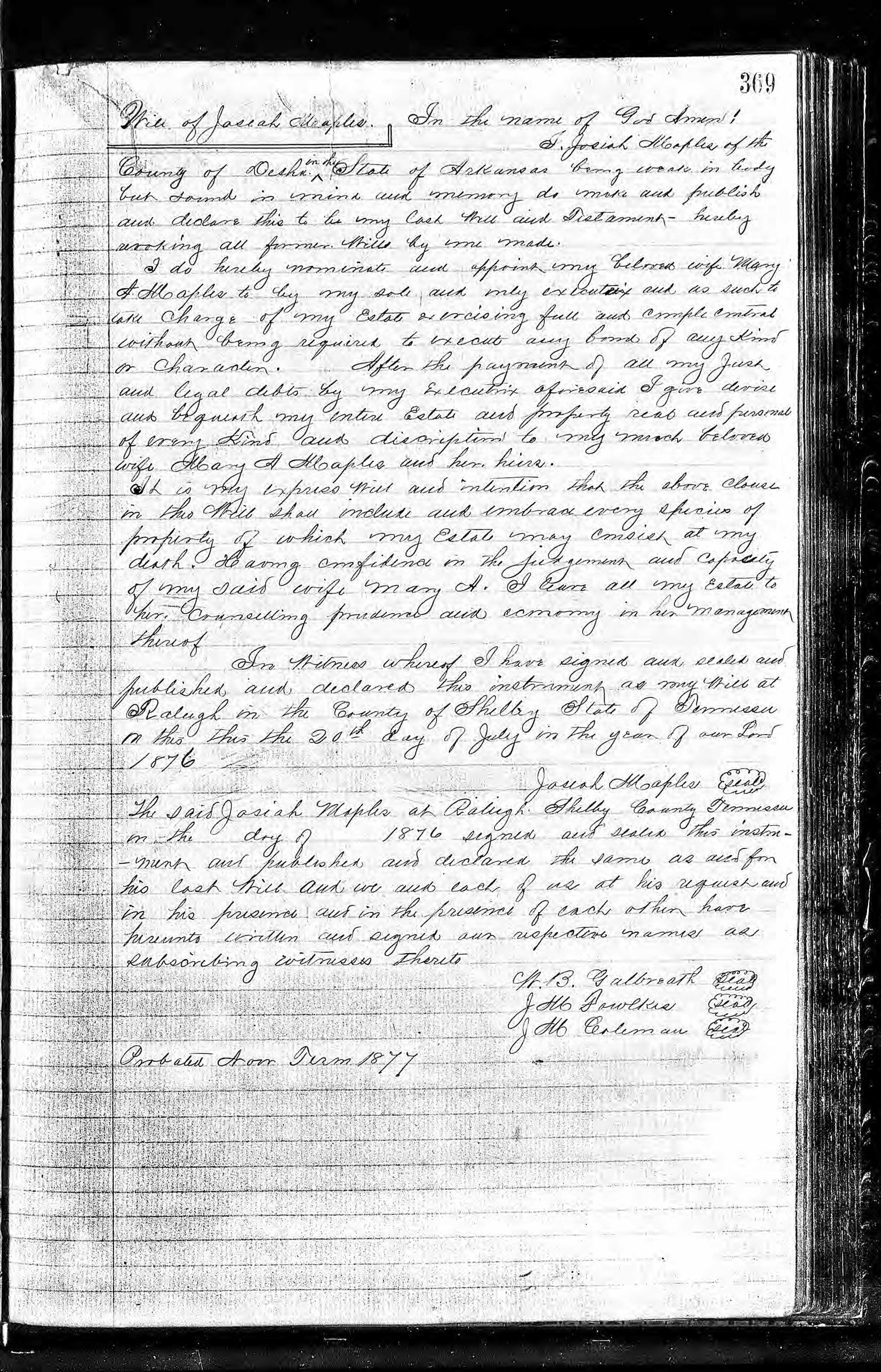
Josiah Maples, last will and testament, made July 20, 1876

Maples was enumerated as a resident of Desha County, Arkansas during the 1870 census, along with his wife, Mary A. Maples, and their three children, Lizzie, Marshall, and Clement. In 1875 he was described as "one of the heaviest cotton planters of the Arkansas valley". In 1876 Maples' primary residence was listed as Red Fork, Arkansas. Red Fork was described as "a post office and landing on the Arkansas River, thirty miles above its mouth, and four miles from Watson, the county seat of Desha county". Maples was considered a pioneer of Desha County, and a leading, if not the leading, citizen of the area of fertile bottomland that was said to "frequently [produce] two bales of cotton to the acre".

Maples died in the Raleigh section of Memphis on September 22, 1876, after a long illness. Maples was buried in Rossville, Tennessee.

== See also ==
- Forrest's slave jail
- Memphis and Hernando Plank Road
- List of American slave traders
