= Forrest & Maples =

Slave-trading company, Memphis, Tennessee

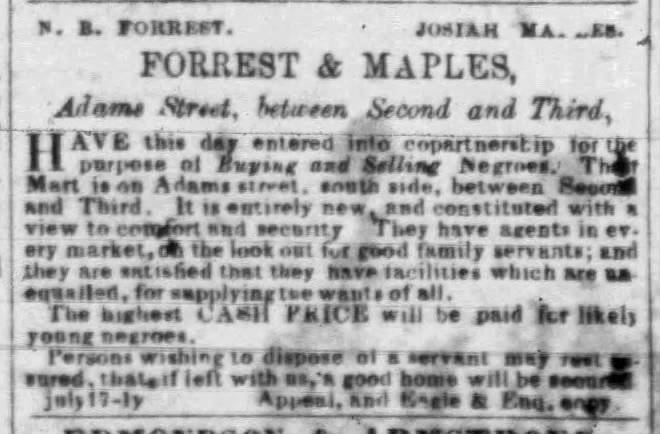
Forrest & Maples newspaper advertisement

Forrest & Maples was an American slave-trading company based in Memphis, Tennessee, United States during the mid-1850s. The principals, Josiah Maples and Nathan Bedford Forrest, were in business together as Forrest & Maples from July 1854 to December 31, 1855.

== History ==
In November 1854 Forrest & Maples sold a nine-year-old girl named Page to Lavinia and Lemuel Smith for $600. According to Forrest biographer Jack Hurst:

The profits of the trade during this era, in which the prices of slaves in the burgeoning Southwest were rising quickly, are indicated by the return on a two-week investment Forrest & Maples made on three—'Ellick aged 30, Rhita aged 40 + her child Ellick 6 years'—purchased from Miss S. I. Stailey on October 16, 1854, for $1,450. On November 2 the firm sold what apparently was the same trio—listed this time in the Shelby County Register's records as 'Ellick age 33, Ritter age 38, Ellick Jr. 5 years old'—to Sam Tate for $ 1,600. Such profit (more than 10 percent in seventeen days) was commonplace, made possible by the economic tenor of the time and place.

On July 9, 1855, they sold Adisson, age 22, to V. Beckworth for $1,000. Also in 1855, Forrest & Maples sold Mary, age 15, for $800.

One interesting case of a runaway slave ad placed by the firm is told in Chase C. Mooney's Slavery in Tennessee (1957): "Forrest and Maples offered the largest known reward for one of their escapees. They would pay $500 to the deliverer of Richard—if taken in a free state—a Charleston-reared carpenter about thirty years old who could read and write well".

On New Year's 1856 the Maples and Forrest partnership was dissolved.

== See also ==
- Forrest's jail
