= Charles S. Sydnor =

American historian (1898–1954)

- Born: Charles Sackett Sydnor; July 21, 1898; Augusta, Georgia, U.S.
- Died: March 2, 1954 (aged 55)
- Occupations: Historian; history professor; author

Charles Sackett Sydnor (July 21, 1898 – March 2, 1954) was an American history professor and author in the United States. He was born in Augusta, Georgia.

He wrote 23 biographical sketches for the Dictionary of American Biography.

The Southern Historical Association gives out an award named for him. Duke University has a collection of his papers.

== Writings ==
- Slavery in Mississippi (1933)
- A Gentleman of the Old Natchez Region: Benjamin L. C. Wailes (1938)
- The Development of Southern Sectionalism, 1818–1848 (1948)
- Gentlemen Freeholders: Political Practices in Washington's Virginia (1952)
- American Revolutionaries in the Making (1965)
