= Post-1808 importation of slaves to the United States =

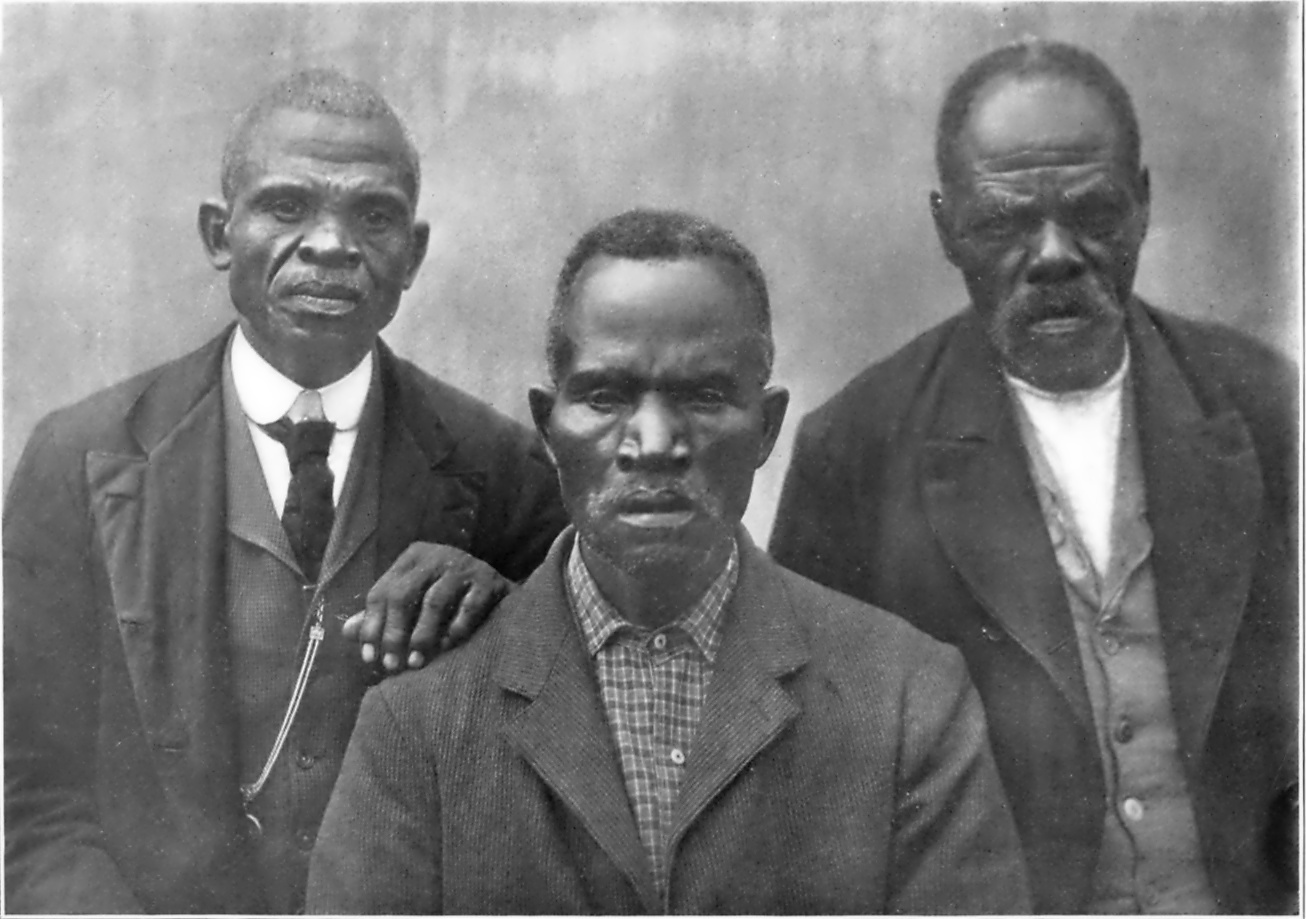
Ward Lee, Tucker Henderson, and Romeo—born Cilucängy, Pucka Gaeta, and Tahro in the Congo River basin—were trafficked to the United States in 1859 on the Wanderer (1908 photograph by Charles J. Montgomery for the journal American Anthropologist)

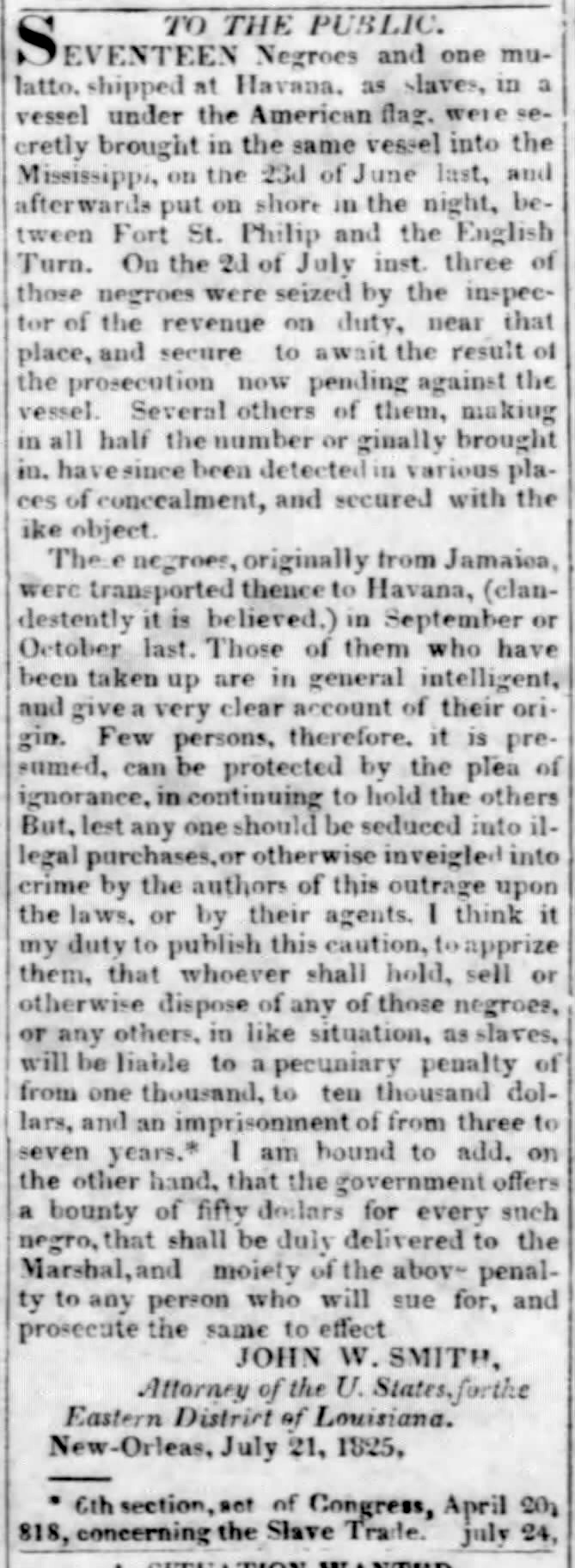
Following the discovery of 18 enslaved people from Jamaica who were deposited along the Mississippi River at a spot between Fort St. Philip and English Turn, U.S. Attorney for the Eastern District of Louisiana John W. Smith published this notice reminding the public that the importation of enslaved people from overseas was illegal and would be prosecuted (Louisiana State Gazette, December 8, 1825)

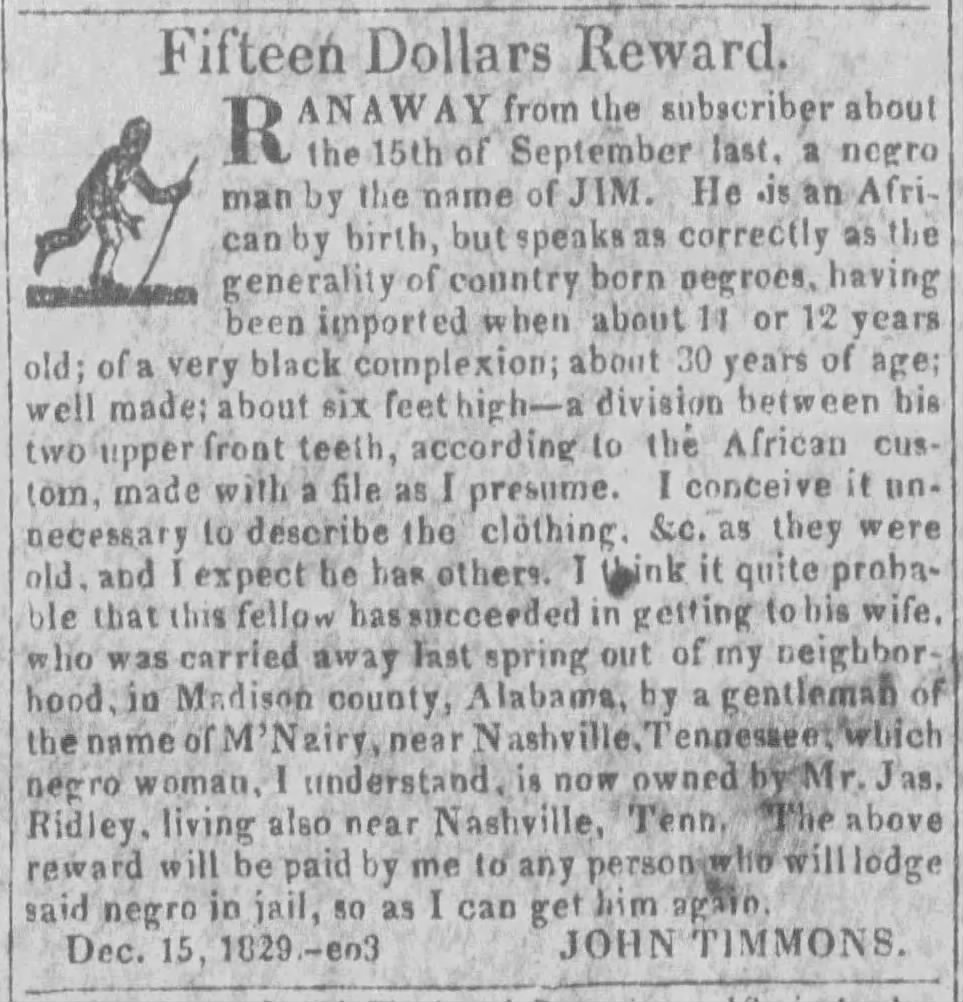
Jim may have been trafficked from Africa three or four years after the 1808 ban went into effect ("Fifteen Dollars Reward" National Banner and Nashville Whig, December 19, 1829)

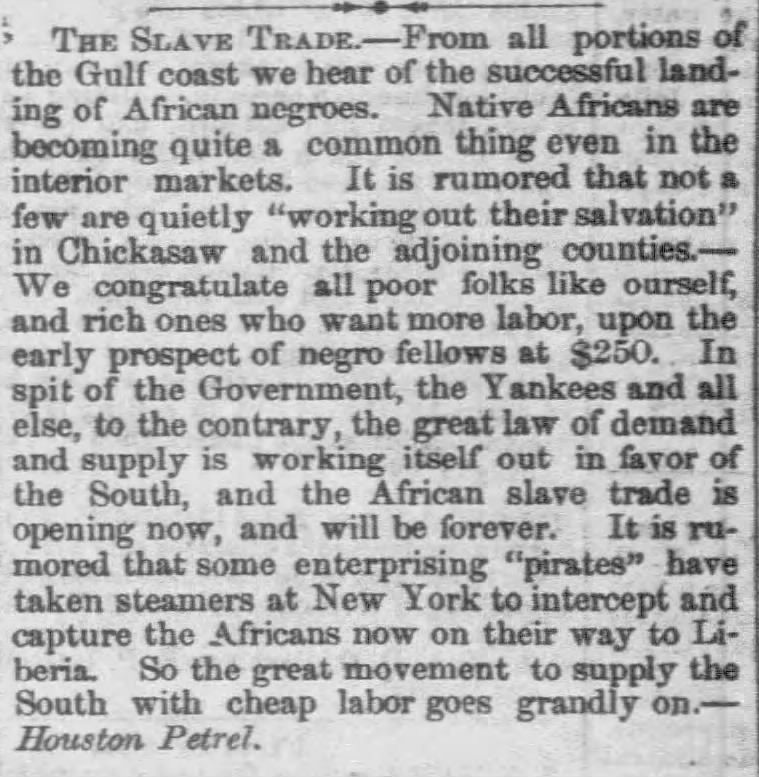
There was a practical resurgence in American piracy in tandem with the political movement to reopen to the Atlantic slave trade; by August 1860, the Houston Petrel claimed "native Africans are becoming quite a common thing, even in interior markets"

The importation of slaves from overseas to the United States was prohibited in 1808, but criminal trafficking of enslaved people on a smaller scale likely continued for many years. The most intensive periods of piracy were in the 1810s, before the U.S. Congress passed laws with massive fines and penalties including execution for illegal importers, and in the 1850s, when pro-slavery activists decided that the solution to rapid inflation in slave prices was simply to flood the market with humans abducted from across the ocean. Regarding the death penalties, in the 1830s a ship captain was jailed for importing from Cuba to Florida and later told an acquaintance at Key West, "no Jury in the United States would hang him for bringing negroes in the United States as an evidence of it he said they bailed him for four hundred dollars."

== History ==
Under an agreement made at the time of the ratification of the U.S. Constitution, Congress passed an Act Prohibiting the Importation of Slaves in 1807 and the law became effective in 1808. Many states already had similar laws, but with a multitude of exceptions; South Carolina, for instance, prohibited and then reauthorized the African slave trade multiple times between colonization and the 1787 Constitutional Convention, and then reopened the port of Charleston to the transatlantic slave trade between 1803 and 1807, during which time some 40,000 to 50,000 enslaved Africans were imported to the state. (Some states also passed laws prohibiting or heavily regulating interstate trading, although over time most of these laws would be diminished, disregarded, and eventually repealed entirely.) After 1808, people transporting slaves by coastwise routes had to sign affidavits before U.S. Customs officers swearing that none of their cargo came from anywhere but the Continental United States. Refugees from the Haitian Revolution who moved to Louisiana were permitted to bring their slaves with them, which added approximately 3,000 souls to the enslaved population of the United States.

Enforcement of the law was initially poor, as the slave trade was banned in the midst of the Napoleonic Wars and Latin American Wars of Independence. Privateers loyal to all sides were active in the Caribbean and used their existing smuggling networks in the United States to also bring slaves into the country. There were at least 100 slave smugglers (privateers and pirates) importing slaves into the U.S. in the 1800s; the Lafittes were the most famous of these. Historian David Head has identified 30 cases of privateers landing or being captured in the U.S. that resulted in 4,000 slaves being imported or captured and then sold. These ships operated primarily off Louisiana, near Galveston, and in the vicinity of Amelia Island off the coast of Florida. In 1820 the Act to protect the commerce of the United States and punish the crime of piracy instituted massive fines and the death penalty for pirates caught importing slaves into the United States. The new laws, combined with geopolitical stability and peace in the Caribbean region, caused a decline in the slave trade after 1820.

By the 1830s, active anti-slavery patrols by both the U.S. and Royal Navies were in operation of the coast of West Africa. Despite the patrols and legal strictures on slave shipments from outside the United States, officials believed that trafficking of enslaved people from Africa, South America, and the Caribbean continued to at least some extent. Although the federal government contributed to the anti-slavery patrols, it refused to allow the Royal Navy to search American-flagged vessels for slaves, the only country to do so. Reasons for this varied; some politicians wished to avoid repeating the impressment controversy which had been a cause of the War of 1812, while others, such as diplomat Nicholas Trist, covertly supported the trade. Increasingly, slave ships bound not just for the United States, but also for Cuba and Brazil, flew the American flag to avoid searches. At least 500 enslaved people from Africa were imported to Mexican Texas in the early 1830s.

Contemporary and later analyses have produced a wide range of estimates on the size of the trade. According to abolitionist William Jay in 1844, "In a debate in Congress in 1819, Mr. Middleton of South Carolina, stated, that in his opinion, 13,000 Africans were annually smuggled into the United States. Mr. Wright of Virginia estimated the number at 15,000!" Supreme Court Justice Joseph Story and Secretary of the Navy Paul Hamilton also asserted in public declarations that human trafficking from overseas continued. According to historian Paul Finkelman, fewer than 10,000 people in total may have been trafficked from Africa to the United States between 1825 and 1850.

Debarking the cargo of William at Key West

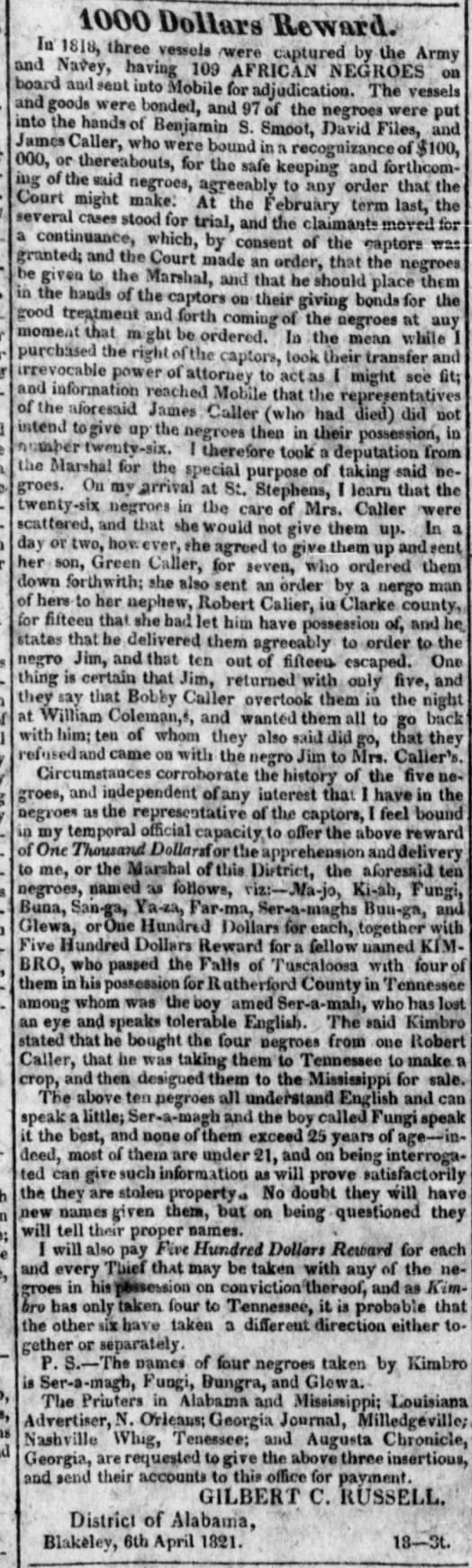
In 1821, Gilbert C. Russell was offering US$1,000 (equivalent to $24,188 in 2025) for the recovery of Majo, Kiah, Fungi, Buna, Sanga, Yaza, Farma, Seramaghs, Buuga, and Glewa, all of whom had been part of a captured cargo of 109 illegally imported African-born slaves and who had been dispersed and resold illegally (Natchez Gazette, April 28, 1821)

By the 1850s, a growing movement to reopen the transatlantic slave trade was part and parcel of the pro-slavery agitation of the Fire-Eaters in the south. During this time (in an attempt to move the ball forward toward an unimpeded nationwide slavery-based economy), Charles A. L. Lamar and investors including N. C. Trowbridge, John Montmollin, and Nathan Bedford Forrest, were involved in trafficking people from the Congo River basin to the Savannah River and Mississippi River watersheds, on the Wanderer certainly, but likely on the E. A. Rawlins and the Richard Cobden as well.

== Specific cases ==
- Jean and Pierre Lafitte, more famous for their actions at the Battle of New Orleans, smuggled slaves to Louisiana on several occasions between 1805 and 1820, operating from bases in Barataria Bay, Amelia Island, and Galveston, Texas, with other French and Spanish privateers.
- Schooner Emperor landed at Port St. Joe, Florida Territory in February 1837 with a cargo of "only a few oranges" that were in fact enslaved Africans most recently held at Havana, Cuba. The captain was arrested and tried. In the words of historian Dorothy Dodd, due "long and idented coastline and of its proximity to Cuba, Florida afforded an excellent opportunity for the illegal importation of slaves."
- On June 12, 1839, the British brigantine HMS Buzzard escorted the brig Eagle into New York Harbor after it was caught engaging in the slave trade in Africa. The ship had been built in Baltimore by William G. Harrison and Walter Price, then sailed to Havana, where it was purchased by Joshua W. Lettig. Multiple American consular staff witnessed and approved of the ship's sale and contracts, including Nicholas Trist, the consul in Havana. Four other American slave ships, the Clara, Wyoming, Catherine, and Butterfly, were similarly captured and escorted to New York that year by the Royal Navy. However, none of the resulting litigation against the ships' owners or crews resulted in conviction.
- Echo, American-flagged slaver captured in 1858 near Cuba and towed to Charleston; crew acquitted by jury; pro-slavery editorial writers later complained that James Buchanan had wanted to squander federal funds to care for the survivors and then ship them back to Africa, rather than release them to the market for sale and the supposed relative beneficence of American slavery.
- In April 1860 there was a rumor that a "cargo of African negroes" had been landed in the natural harbor between Corpus Christi and Indianola, Texas.
- The William, captained by a Philadelphian and bound for Havana, was captured by the USS Wyandotte (1853) and landed at Key West. The bulk of the human cargo would probably be sent to Liberia, and supposedly 190 passengers died at Key West and were to be buried—but this mortality claim may have been a ruse to supply plantations in Alabama and Mississippi with new enslaved laborers, as 23 Africans were to be auctioned at the St. Charles Hotel in June 1860.
- Clotida landed at Mobile Bay in July 1860.

== See also ==
- Atlantic slave trade to Brazil
- Slavery in Cuba
- Nathaniel Gordon – American slave trader (1826–1862)
- Blackbirding
- Piracy in the Atlantic World
- West Indies anti-piracy operations of the United States
- Amelia Island affair – Occupation of island in Spanish Florida in 1817
