= List of Georgia and Florida slave traders =

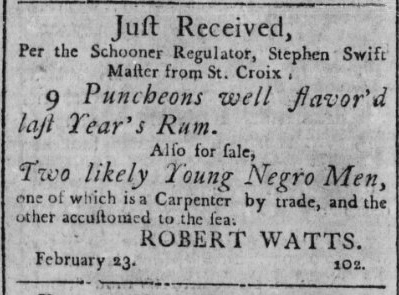
Robert Watts was the leading Savannah slave seller of the immediate post-Revolutionary War era in Georgia

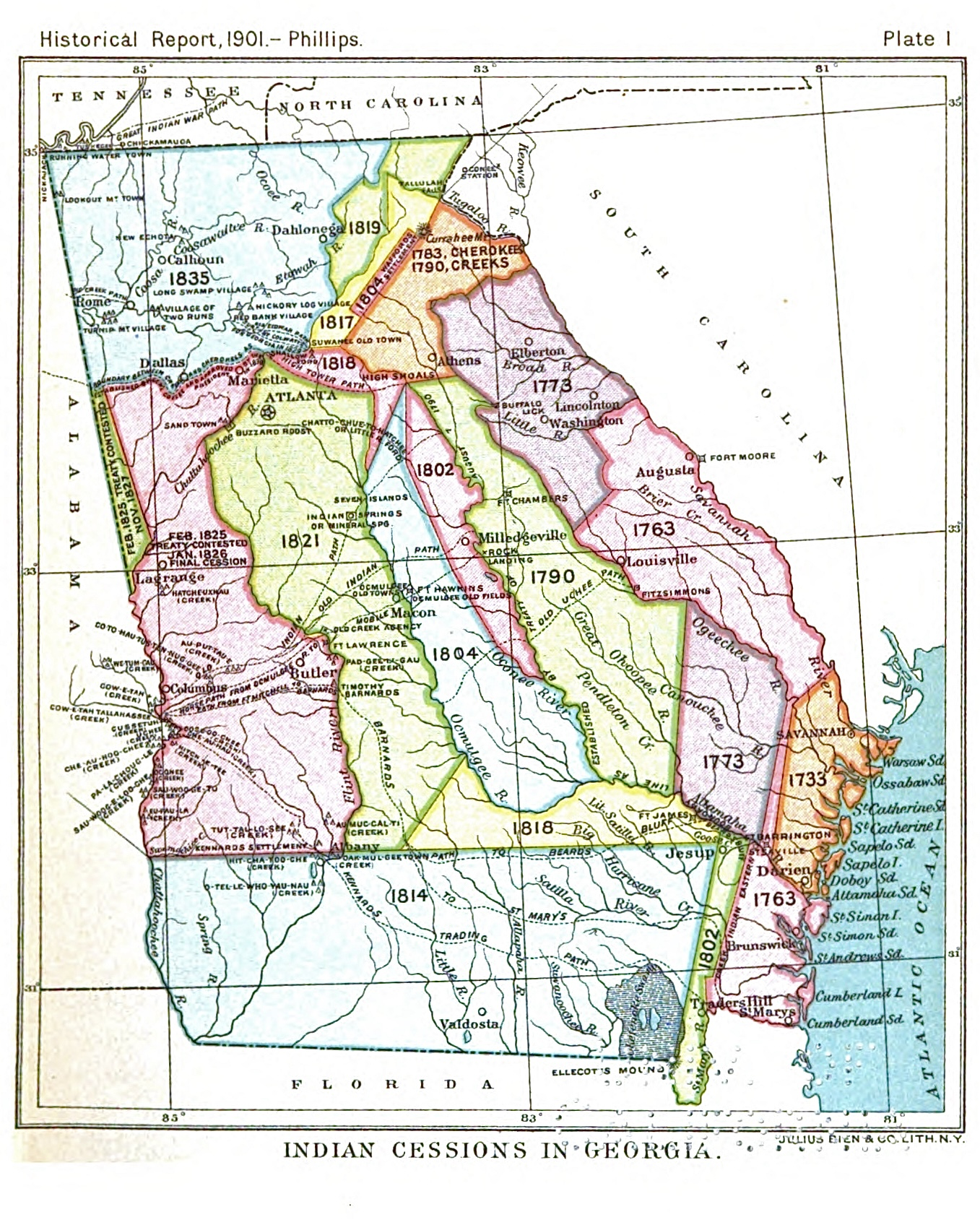
Indian cessions in Georgia (From Eighteenth Report Bureau American Ethnology, with alterations, 1902)

Georgia in 1830

This is a list of American slave traders working in Georgia and Florida from 1776 until 1865.

The importation of slaves from overseas was prohibited by the Continental Congress during the American Revolutionary War but resumed locally afterwards, including through the port of Savannah, Georgia (until 1798). Especially in the 1790s, slavers sailing out of Rhode Island would go directly to Africa and trade rum for captives and then sell them in either Cuba or Georgia, wherever the prices were better that season.

It was technically illegal to import slaves into Georgia from other states from 1788 until the law was repealed in 1856, but there was no law prohibiting the sale of slaves just across the border in the lands of the Cherokee Nation in what became the northwest quadrant of the state after Indian Removal, or across the Savannah River in Hamburg, South Carolina, maybe across the Chattahoochee River from Columbus in Alabama, or perhaps in Tallahassee in the Florida Territory.

Regarding Florida, in 1935 Dorothy Dodd reported on an early 19th-century court case involving an illegal slave ship and noted in her account that slave-traffick records for Florida are thin if not non-existent but Frederic Bancroft in Slave-Trading in the Old South stated that "Florida, especially in the earlier years, bred very few slaves and was almost entirely a slave-importing state. Although Bancroft is concerned primarily with the domestic slave trade, the factors that made Florida a good market for negroes bred in the Old South probably created a certain tolerance of the importation of negroes from beyond the seas."

- W. E. Archer
- J. B. Allgood, Macon
- Austin, Georgia and Virginia
- A. K. Ayer, Columbus, Ga.
- Thomas Bagby, Macon, Ga.
- William K. Bagby, Atlanta, Ga.
- Robert Beasley, Macon, Ga.
- Bebee, Atlanta, Ga.
- Blount & Dawson, Savannah
- Alexander Bryan, Savannah
- Joseph Bryan, Savannah
- Busster, Georgia
- Redmond Bunn, Macon, Ga.
- Curtiss Carroll, Georgia
- Clark & Grubb, Atlanta
- Robert M. Clarke, Atlanta, Ga.
- Amaziah Cobb, Georgia
- Charles Collins, Macon
- Joseph M. Cooper, Macon, Ga.
- W. S. Cothron, Floyd, Ga.
- Crawford, Frazer & Co., Atlanta, Ga., principals Robert Crawford, Addison D. Frazer, and Thomas Lafayette Frazer
- James Dean (or Deane), Macon
- Theophile DeMello, Pensacola, East Florida
- Milledge Durham and William Brightwell, Georgia
- Fields & Gresham, Atlanta, Ga.
- Theophilus Freeman, Georgia, Virginia, and New Orleans
- L. Graves
- George Griffin, Georgia
- S. H. Griffin, Atlanta
- Henry C. Halcomb, Atlanta, Ga.
- George Harris, Georgia
- Charles S. Harrison, Columbus, Ga.
- W. H. Henderson, Atlanta, Ga.
- W. C. Hewitt, Macon, Ga.
- L. Hull, Augusta
- Inman, Cole & Co., Atlanta, Ga.
- George W. Jones, Virginia and Georgia
- Jones & Robinson, Georgia
- John Jossey, Macon
- Jerrome, Danbury, Ga.
- Zephaniah Kingsley, Florida
- Jesse Kirby and John Kirby, Virginia and Georgia
- Charles A. L. Lamar
- Lowe & Simmons, Columbus, Ga.
- McRiley, Georgia
- Meinhard brothers, Savannah
- Miller and Waterman, Macon
- John S. Montmollin, Savannah
- Dick Mulhundro, Virginia and Georgia
- Myers & Thomas, Columbus, Ga.
- Thomas Napier, Macon, Ga.
- Jack Nickols, Georgia and Alabama
- George Nixon, Carolinas, Georgia, Alabama
- G. H. Noel, Macon, Ga.
- James G. Noel, Macon, Ga.
- Joe Norris, Georgia (?)
- Nowell, Macon
- Nowland, Virginia and Georgia
- A. J. Orr and D. W. Orr, Macon, Ga.
- Edward A. Parker, Macon, Ga.
- W. R. Phillips, Macon, Ga.
- Rafe Phillips, Macon
- George I. Pitts, Columbus, Ga.
- Ponder brothers (Ephraim G. Ponder, James Ponder, John G. Ponder, William G. Ponder), Tallahassee, Fla. and Atlanta and Thomas County, Ga.
- Annie Poore, Georgia
- Zachariah A. Rice, Atlanta, Ga.
- Robinson, South Carolina and Georgia
- John Robinson, Georgia
- E. H. Simmons, Virginia and Georgia
- Shadrack F. Slatter
- B. D. Smith, Atlanta, Ga.
- Smith & Co., Macon
- Charles F. Stubbs, Macon, Ga.
- Henry Teuker, Virginia and Georgia
- John Thornton, South Carolina and Dalton, Ga.
- N. C. Trowbridge, Augusta, Ga. & Hamburg, S.C.
- Wadkins, Virginia and Georgia
- Mat Warner, Virginia and Georgia
- Robert Watts, Savannah
- William Watkins, Atlanta, Ga.
- Weatherby, Augusta, Ga.
- Winston & Dixon, Georgia
- William Wright, Savannah

== See also ==
- History of slavery in Georgia
- Amelia Island
- Florida Patriot War
- Seminole Wars
- List of Alabama slave traders
- List of District of Columbia slave traders
- List of Kentucky slave traders
- List of Maryland and Delaware slave traders
- List of Missouri slave traders
- Family separation in American slavery
- List of largest slave sales in the United States
- Movement to reopen the transatlantic slave trade
- Kidnapping into slavery in the United States
- Bibliography of the slave trade in the United States
- Slave markets and slave jails in the United States

== Sources ==
- Ball, Edward (2014) [1998]. Slaves in the Family. Macmillan. ISBN 9780374534455. LCCN 97034640.
- Bancroft, Frederic (2023) [1931]. Slave Trading in the Old South. Southern Classics Series. Introduction by Michael Tadman. University of South Carolina Press. ISBN 978-1-64336-427-8.
- Bellamy, Donnie D. (1984). "Macon, Georgia, 1823–1860: A Study in Urban Slavery". Phylon. 45 (4): 298–310. doi:10.2307/274910. JSTOR 274910.
- Boudreaux, Sybil Ann (May 1983). The First Minute Book of the Supreme Court of the State of Louisiana 1813 to May, 1818: An Annotated Edition (M.A. History). University of New Orleans. 1683.
- Calderhead, William (1977). "The Role of the Professional Slave Trader in a Slave Economy: Austin Woolfolk, A Case Study". Civil War History. 23 (3): 195–211. doi:10.1353/cwh.1977.0041. ISSN 1533-6271. S2CID 143907436.
- Colby, Robert K. D. (2024). An Unholy Traffic: Slave Trading in the Civil War South. Oxford University Press. doi:10.1093/oso/9780197578261.001.0001. ISBN 9780197578285. LCCN 2023053721. OCLC 1412042395.
- Dodd, Dorothy (January 1935). "The Schooner Emperor: An Incident of the Illegal Slave Trade in Florida". Florida Historical Quarterly. 13 (3) 3: 117–128 – via University of Central Florida Libraries.
- Fitzpatrick, Benjamin Lewis (December 2008). Negroes for Sale: The Slave Trade in Antebellum Kentucky (Ph.D. thesis). University of Notre Dame. doi:10.7274/pn89d50750n.
- Garrett, Franklin M. (2011) [1954]. Atlanta and Environs: A Chronicle of Its People and Events, 1820s–1870s (Reprint ed.). University of Georgia Press. ISBN 9780820339023.
- Friedman, Saul (2017). Jews and the American Slave Trade. Routledge. ISBN 9781351510769.
- Gudmestad, Robert (1999). A Troublesome Commerce: The Interstate Slave Trade, 1808–1840 (Doctor of Philosophy thesis). Louisiana State University and Agricultural & Mechanical College. doi:10.31390/gradschool_disstheses.6941.
- Head, David (2013). "Slave Smuggling by Foreign Privateers: The Illegal Slave Trade and the Geopolitics of the Early Republic". Journal of the Early Republic. 33 (3): 433–462. doi:10.1353/jer.2013.0061. ISSN 0275-1275. JSTOR 24487048.
- Hedrick, Charles Embury (1927). Social and Economic Aspects of Slavery in the Transmontane Prior to 1850. George Peabody College for Teachers. Contributions to education.no. 46. Nashville, Tennessee: George Peabody College for Teachers.
- James, D. Clayton (1993) [1968]. Antebellum Natchez. Baton Rouge, Louisiana: Louisiana State University Press. ISBN 978-0-8071-1860-3. LCCN 68028496. OCLC 28281641.
- Jay, William (1844). A View of the Action of the Federal Government, In Behalf of Slavery. Utica, N.Y.: J.C. Jackson.
- Johnson, Walter (2013). River of Dark Dreams: Slavery and Empire in the Cotton Kingdom. Cambridge: Belknap Press of Harvard University Press. ISBN 9780674074880. LCCN 2012030065. OCLC 827947225. OL 26179618M.
- Johnson, Walter (2009). Soul by Soul: Life Inside the Antebellum Slave Market. Cambridge: Harvard University Press. ISBN 9780674039155. OCLC 923120203.
- Jones-Rogers, Stephanie E. (2019). They Were Her Property: White Women as Slave Owners in the American South. New Haven, Connecticut: Yale University Press. ISBN 978-0-300-21866-4.
- Kendall, John S. (January 1939). "Shadow Over the City". The Louisiana Historical Quarterly. 22 (1). New Orleans: Louisiana Historical Society: 142–165. ISSN 0095-5949. OCLC 1782268. LDS Film 1425689, Image Group Number (DGS) 1640025 – via FamilySearch Digital Library.
- Kytle, Ethan J.; Roberts, Blain (2018). Denmark Vesey's garden: slavery and memory in the cradle of the Confederacy. New York: The New Press. ISBN 9781620973660. LCCN 2017041546.
- Libby, David J. (2004). Slavery and Frontier Mississippi, 1720–1835. University Press of Mississippi. ISBN 1-57806-599-2.
- Menck, Mary (2017). The Devil's Backbone: Race, Space, and Nation-Building on the Natchez Trace (M.A. thesis). Medford, Massachusetts: Tufts University.
- Mooney, Chase C. (1971) [1957]. "Chapter Two: Hire, Sale, Theft and Flight of Slaves". Slavery in Tennessee. Westport, Conn.: Negro Universities Press. pp. 29–63.
- Phillips, U. Bonnell (1936) [1918]. American Negro slavery: a survey of the supply, employment and control of Negro labor as determined by the plantation régime. New York: D. Appleton and Company.
- Schermerhorn, Calvin (2015). The business of slavery and the rise of American capitalism, 1815–1860. New Haven, Conn.: Yale University Press. ISBN 978-0-300-19200-1.
- Schermerhorn, Calvin (2016). "Chapter 10. The Coastwise Slave Trade and a Mercantile Community of Interest". In Rockman, Seth Edward; Beckert, Sven (eds.). Slavery's Capitalism: A New History of American Economic Development. Early American Studies. Philadelphia: University of Pennsylvania Press. pp. 209–224. doi:10.9783/9780812293098-011. ISBN 978-0-8122-4841-8. JSTOR j.ctt1dfnrs7. LCCN 2016304619. OCLC 945028802.
- Sellers, James Benson (2015) [1950]. "Chapter 5: Traffic in Slaves". Slavery in Alabama. Library of Alabama Classics. Introduction by Harriet E. Amos Doss. Tuscaloosa: University of Alabama Press. ISBN 9780817389147. LCCN 50004433. OCLC 899157440.
- Stowe, Harriet Beecher (1853). A key to Uncle Tom's cabin: presenting the original facts and documents upon which the story is founded. Boston: J. P. Jewett & Co. LCCN 02004230. OCLC 317690900. OL 21879838M.
- Sydnor, Charles S. (1933). Slavery in Mississippi. American Historical Association, Carnegie Corporation of New York. New York: D. Appleton-Century Co. LCCN 33033678. OCLC 1968805.
- Wax, Darold D. (1984). ""New Negroes Are Always in Demand": The Slave Trade in Eighteenth-Century Georgia". The Georgia Historical Quarterly. 68 (2): 193–220. ISSN 0016-8297.
- Williams, Jennie K. (April 2, 2020). "Trouble the water: The Baltimore to New Orleans coastwise slave trade, 1820–1860". Slavery & Abolition. 41 (2): 275–303. doi:10.1080/0144039X.2019.1660509. ISSN 0144-039X. S2CID 203494471.
- Wilson, Carol (2009) [1994]. Freedom at Risk: The Kidnapping of Free Blacks in America, 1780–1865. University Press of Kentucky. ISBN 9780813149790. JSTOR j.ctt130j5m9. LCCN 93021012. OCLC 900344359.
