= Charles Augustus Lafayette Lamar =

Slave blockade runner, Army Confederate officer

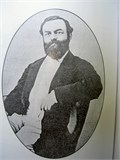
- Born: April 1, 1824; Savannah, Georgia
- Died: April 16, 1865 (aged 41); Columbus, Georgia
- Cause of death: Gunshot wound
- Burial place: Laurel Grove Cemetery
- Spouse: Caroline Agnes Lamar
- Relatives: Gazaway Bugg Lamar
- Military career
- Allegiance: Confederate States of America
- Branch: Confederate States Army
- Service years: 1861–1862, 1865
- Rank: Colonel (CSA)
- Known for: Slave trading, piracy, being the last Confederate officer to be killed in the American Civil War
- Conflicts: American Civil War: Battle of Columbus (1865) †

Charles Augustus Lafayette Lamar (April 1, 1824 – April 16, 1865) was an American businessman from Savannah, Georgia, best known for his leadership in an investment ring to illegally import slaves from Africa on the ship Wanderer in 1858. The ship ran blockades and brought 409 surviving Africans from the Congo to the United States for sale. The ship was later impounded. Although Lamar and numerous other defendants were prosecuted, none of them were convicted.

Born and raised in Savannah, Lamar was the son of businessman and banker Gazaway Bugg Lamar and Jane Meek Cresswell of Augusta. Most of his family was lost in the June 1838 explosion and wreck of the steamship Pulaski. Lamar took over many of his father's business interests and made investments of his own. During the 1850s, he became deeply indebted and entered the illegal slave trade.

Lamar was a secessionist. During the American Civil War, he initially enlisted in the Confederate Army, but he soon returned to civilian life. He worked with his father to manage blockade runners to keep open trade between the Confederacy and the North, as well as Europe. Toward the end of the war, Lamar returned to military service and held the rank of Colonel. He was one of the last Confederates killed in the Civil War, at the Battle of Columbus.

== Early life ==
Lamar was born in Savannah in 1824 to Jane Meek (Cresswell) Lamar, of Augusta, and Gazaway Bugg Lamar. He was named Lafayette after the Revolutionary hero Marquis de Lafayette, who was visiting Savannah as part of his visit to the United States and attended his baptism, as stated in the church record. It has been mistakenly reported that Lafayette was designated as Lamar's godfather.

The Lamar family relocated from Augusta to Savannah, where Gazaway and a group of investors built the steam packet Pulaski in 1837. In June 1838, the Lamar family became victims of the Pulaski disaster off the coast of North Carolina, en route from Savannah to Baltimore. The ship's starboard boiler exploded and sank in only 45 minutes. Out of ten members of the family on board—Gazaway, Jane, Charles, two other sons, and three daughters, Gazaway's sister Rebecca, and a niece—only Gazaway, Charles, and Rebecca survived. Some 128 persons were lost; 59 survived.

Gazaway was married again to Harriet Cazenove of Virginia in July 1839. He and Charles lived with her in Alexandria, Virginia for a year before returning to Savannah. His father and stepmother had a total of six children together. In 1846 the senior Lamar decided to move with Harriet and their family to New York City to expand his business dealings, settling in Brooklyn.

== Marriage and family ==
Lamar married Caroline Agnes Nicoll in February 1846 in Savannah. She was the daughter of John Nicoll and his wife; Nicoll was appointed as the US District judge in Savannah in 1839. Lamar had several other notable relations. Mirabeau B. Lamar, the second President of the Republic of Texas, Georgia judge Lucius Quintus Cincinnatus Lamar I, and representative John B. Lamar were cousins of Gazaway. Speaker of the House Howell Cobb was a cousin by marriage.

== Career ==
Lamar entered several business ventures during the 1840s and 1850s. In 1841, he opened a grocery store with a partner at the age of 17. The store failed by 1844, and he switched to working as a commission merchant. In 1846, Lamar took over his father's business interests in Savannah, which included the Eastern Wharves property and sixteen slaves. He soon became involved in local civic organizations. In 1852, he was elected to a one-year term on the Savannah city council as a Democrat. In 1855, he unsuccessfully ran for the state legislature as a Know Nothing.

Lamar developed a reputation for a hot temper. During his term as an alderman, he was arrested for disorderly conduct and fighting in the street. In 1858, he shot his friend Henry Dubignon during a dispute at a horse racetrack.

== Slave trading ==
A series of bad investments in gold mines and slaves, combined with the Panic of 1857, caused Lamar to fall deep into debt by 1857. He turned to the Atlantic slave trade as a financial remedy, even though the importation of slaves had been banned since 1808. That year, he purchased a ship, the E. A. Rawlins, and had it outfitted to carry a cargo of slaves. He was able to bypass port collector John Boston to allow the ship to clear the port of Savannah, but the ship's hired captain lost his nerve and sailed to New Orleans empty-handed. A second voyage by the Rawlins was made in May 1858, and was rumored to have landed in Cuba with a cargo of 658 Africans. The ship's supercargo abandoned the captain and returned the ship to Savannah with no papers, and the ship was seized by federal authorities but released shortly after.

Lamar openly expressed a desire to reopen the slave trade, and next attempted to bypass existing laws by applying to transport passengers from Africa on the ship Richard Cobden. His cousin Howell Cobb, now serving in the cabinet of James Buchanan as the Secretary of the Treasury, denied three separate applications, deeming each one a ruse to secretly import slaves to the United States or Cuba. Lamar responded by issuing an 11-page pamphlet which criticized and insulted Cobb.

In the summer of 1858, still desperate for money, Lamar led a group of investors to finance an expedition by the Wanderer in order to smuggle in slaves. The ship was outfitted with large water tanks and other requirements for transporting slaves but passed inspection in New York as a pleasure yacht. The ship flew the pennant of the New York Yacht Club when it departed the harbor under command of Captain William R. Corrie, who had purchased it.

Between July and September, the Wanderer sailed from Charleston to the Congo River, evading British and American naval squadrons, where Corrie purchased 487 Africans. On November 29, the ship returned across the Atlantic and arrived at Jekyll Island outside Savannah, which was owned by the Dubignon brothers, friends of Lamar. There were approximately 409 surviving Africans, the remainder having perished on the voyage. Lamar had neglected to hire a local pilot for the crew, and Corrie had to go ashore to hire one and disclose the crew's plans. After the unloading was complete, Lamar and his business associates were alerted and traveled to Jekyll Island on a chartered tugboat. About 300 of the Africans were taken and held at the plantation of Montmillon in South Carolina. Others were distributed to investors. Rumors about the Wanderer soon began to circulate in local newspapers. The ship was taken to Brunswick for repairs but failed to obtain clearance to return to Charleston. Corrie only had unsigned clearance papers to present for the ports of Trinidad and St. Helena, where the ship had never called, raising suspicion. Lamar wrote that he ultimately failed to make a profit on the venture.

=== Trials ===
Joseph Ganahl, the United States Attorney for the District of Georgia, quickly began gathering evidence against Lamar. When three members of the crew entered Savannah on December 7, Ganahl immediately had them arrested. The Wanderer was seized in Brunswick, although the crew had fled Georgia by that point. News of the Wanderer's activities spread nationwide and was overwhelmingly condemned in both the Northern and Southern press. In early January, Lamar's father-in-law, Judge Nicoll, ruled the ship had been used for slave trading and ordered it to be auctioned off.

Lamar was able to successfully thwart Ganahl from retaining the evidence with the assistance of U.S. marshall Daniel Stewart, a close friend. One of the Africans from the ship was found and apprehended on December 24, but was kidnapped from his jail cell the following night. Two other Africans were found shortly after, but Lamar issued a writ of possession for them as his personal slaves while Ganahl was not present in Savannah and was allowed to leave the jail with them, after which they were not seen again. 36 of the Africans were found being trafficked through Worth County in late February, but Stewart ordered their release. In March, Lamar purchased the Wanderer back by placing the highest bid at auction in Charleston.

A series of six trials were held between November 1859 and May 1860, presided over by Associate Justice of the Supreme Court James M. Wayne and Judge Nicoll. Five members of the crew who could be located were tried for piracy, while Lamar and his associates were charged with holding the Africans who had been trafficked. During the trials, Lamar challenged a witness to a duel, where both men missed their marks. Lamar also engaged in another jailbreak to remove one of the crew members from his cell and take him to a party in Savannah, for which he was charged and pled guilty. All other trials resulted in acquittal or mistrial. In November 1860, the remaining charges were dropped amidst talk of Georgia's secession.

Lamar continued to be involved in slave trading activities during the trials. After refurbishing the Wanderer, he attempted to sell the ship but found no potential buyers. In October 1859, he sold a share in the ship to a captain named David Martin. Shortly after, Martin shanghaied the crew and the Wanderer sailed again for Africa. The crew mutinied and returned to the United States in December, where the ship was once again seized. An admiralty court found Lamar liable for Martin's actions and the vessel was declared forfeited.

== Civil War ==
Lamar was a supporter of secession and organized a militia company for the state of Georgia in 1860. After the start of the Civil War, he organized and became a lieutenant colonel of the 7th Georgia Battalion, which later became part of the 61st Georgia Volunteer Infantry. They entered Confederate Army service on October 9, 1861. Lamar was responsible for the defense of Jekyll Island under the command of General Robert E. Lee. After he was ordered to withdraw to the mainland, Lamar resigned his commission on April 2, 1862.

Lamar's father Gazaway had returned to Savannah in 1861, re-establishing himself in the city. After resigning his commission, Lamar worked with his father in his business interests to keep the Confederate States supplied, including through blockade-running ventures. The younger Lamar was sent to England, where he purchased five ships for blockade-running.

After the capture of Savannah during Sherman's March to the Sea, Lamar re-entered the Confederate Army as a colonel on the staff of Howell Cobb, who was now a general. Lamar was shot and killed by a stray bullet during the Battle of Columbus, although sources disagree if he was first captured. He was buried at Laurel Grove Cemetery in Savannah.

== Legacy ==
In 1886, while Lamar's cousin Lucius Quintus Cincinnatus Lamar was serving in the cabinet of president Grover Cleveland, a collection of Lamar's letters was published by the North American Review, claiming that they had been salvaged from a New England paper mill. The publication renewed interest in Lamar, and Generals James H. Wilson and William T. Sherman wrote to the Review, claiming Lamar was the last man killed in action at Columbus and the last Confederate "of note" to be killed. Subsequent sources have claimed Lamar was the last Confederate officer killed in the Civil War. (Note: The Battle of Columbus is regarded by many authorities to be the final battle of the Civil War. The Battle of Palmito Ranch, which occurred after the Battle of Columbus and is regarded by others as the final battle of the war, did not result in any Confederate dead.)

Historians such as Tom Henderson Wells regard Lamar as an effective, if unscrupulous, businessman who acted on principle to defend the slaveholding society. This view has been challenged by Jim Jordan, who writes that Lamar had a poor business record, believed he would profit from the expeditions, and was primarily motivated by financial desperation. An editor for the North American Review wrote Lamar "insisted, before the public, that that he was fighting for a principle; and so queer a bulb is the human head, that perhaps he thought he told the truth".

== See also ==
- Clotilda (slave ship), the final known U.S. slave ship
- N. C. Trowbridge – American slave trader and Confederate agent (1815–1879)
- Ceres (blockade runner)
- List of Georgia slave traders
