= N. C. Trowbridge =

American slave trader and Confederate agent (1815–1879)

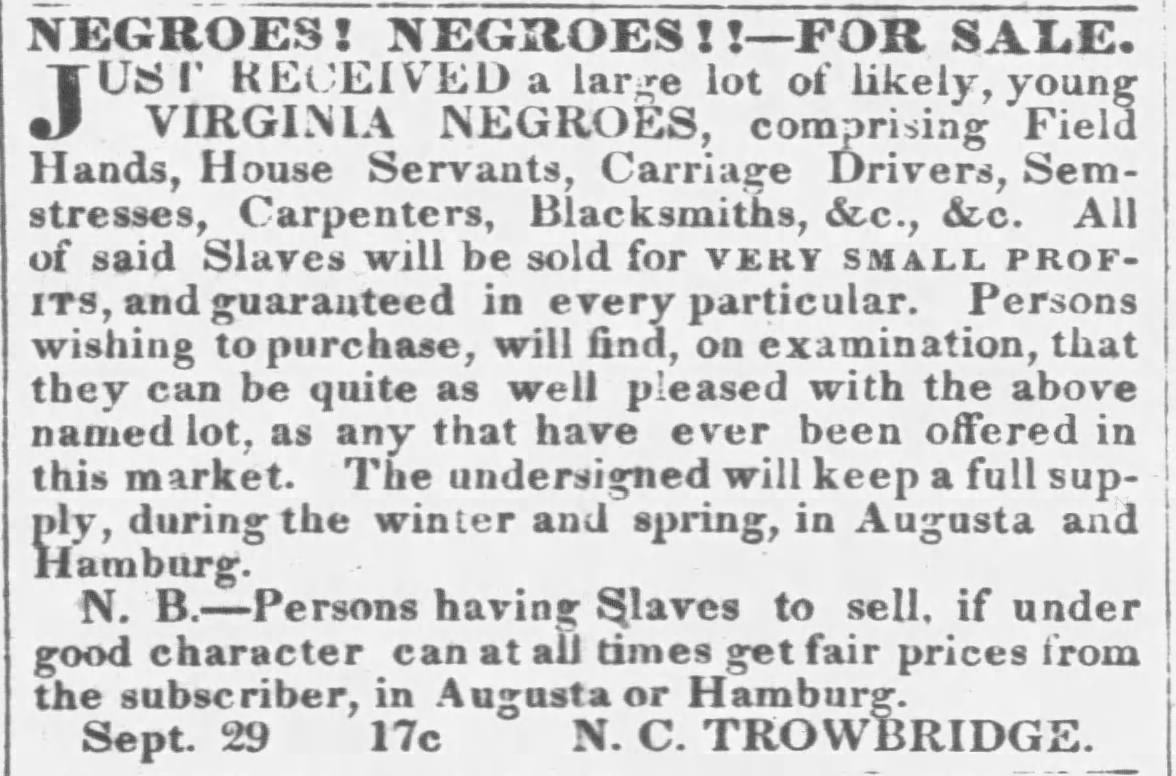
- "Negroes! Negroes!! For Sale" Augusta Daily Constitutionalist and Republic, September 29, 1847
- Born: July 8, 1815; Cambridge, Vermont, U.S.
- Died: April 23, 1879 (aged 63); Canton, Mississippi, U.S.
- Occupations: Slave trader, plantation owner, racehorse breeder

Nelson Clement Trowbridge (July 8, 1815 – April 23, 1879), usually doing business as N. C. Trowbridge, was an American businessman who worked as both a merchant and farmer in Poughkeepsie, New York, and a slave trader in the Deep South for approximately 25 years prior to the American Civil War. Trowbridge trafficked slaves in Virginia, the Carolinas, Georgia, and Louisiana. He also became a plantation owner in Mississippi. He was party to the illegal importation of slaves from Africa on the Wanderer in 1857. Many of the letters written by C. A. L. Lamar about his illegal transatlantic slave trade enterprise of the late 1850s were addressed to Trowbridge ("Trow") in New Orleans. Lamar and Trowbridge, who had had several businesses together, from breeding racehorses to mining for gold, were responsible for at least one blockade-runner, the Ceres, during the American Civil War. Trowbridge was arrested on treason charges twice during the war, and convicted in 1864 of treason and blockade running. The New York Herald and other newspapers deemed him a New York-based Confederate spy and business agent. He seems to have lived in New York City and Mississippi after the war. He died in Mississippi in 1879 and is buried in Augusta, Georgia.

== Early life and business career ==
Trowbridge was born in Vermont. According to a Trowbridge surname study, "Nelson C. Trowbridge received his early instruction in business in his father's store in Medina, N.Y. In 1835 he went to the South and engaged in mercantile business for himself in Augusta, Ga. Subsequently he was engaged in planting and in operating in real estate in the South and in New York City." In what might well have been a case of wartime sour grapes or might have been a statement of facts, in 1864, a Burlington, Vermont newspaper printed the following assessment of Trowbridge's character based on local recollections of his youth in Vermont:

N. C. Trowbridge, who figures so prominently in the Lamar correspondence, is Nelson Clement Trowbridge, a native of Cambridge, Vermont, who after being guilty of many mean tricks, fled from his birth-place many years since to the South, where he married a fair Southron with "lots of nigs." His latter-day reputation is not much more enviable than that of his tender years.

In 1846, newspaper reports show that Trowbridge was engaged in breeding and betting on horses with Charles Augustus Lamar of Georgia. In 1848 his partner was named John M. Cureton, and he worked out of the Hamburg, South Carolina slave market. (Note: For some biographical detail on a J. E. Cureton of Lancaster District, who seems to have been an extensive slave trader in the same geographic area, see Tadman, Michael (September 2007). "The Reputation of the Slave Trader in Southern History and the Social Memory of the South". American Nineteenth Century History. 8 (3): 247–271. doi:10.1080/14664650701505117. ISSN 1466-4658..)

Letters written by Trowbridge were amongst the cache looted from the office of Richmond slave trader R. H. Dickinson by Lucy and Sarah Chase. From these letters, scholars of American slavery have evidence that traders would sometimes let potential buyers "test out" slaves on a trial basis. Slave traders would also do "swaps," with Trowbridge writing Dickinson, "I exchanged your boy Patrick today and got a No. one boy 18 and 50 dolls. A fust rate SWOP." He made at least two slaves sales another Georgia slave trader named to E. H. Simmons. Trowbridge seems to have traveled frequently, visiting New Orleans, Charleston, New York City, and Macon, Georgia.

At the time of the 1850 U.S. census Trowbridge lived in Richmond County, Georgia, and reported that his occupation as "speculator." On the slave schedules he was listed as the legal owner of 29 people, two of whom were categorized as "fugitives from the state." In 1851 Trowbridge advertised the products of the American Railroad Chair Manufacturing Company, of which he was secretary, in railroad industry magazines. In 1856, Trowbridge, Lamar and others were investors in the Park Mine in Columbus County, Georgia that yielded at least two gold nuggets. In 1857 Trowbridge owned stock in the Commercial Bank of Racine, Wisconsin.

== Illegal importation of slaves from overseas ==
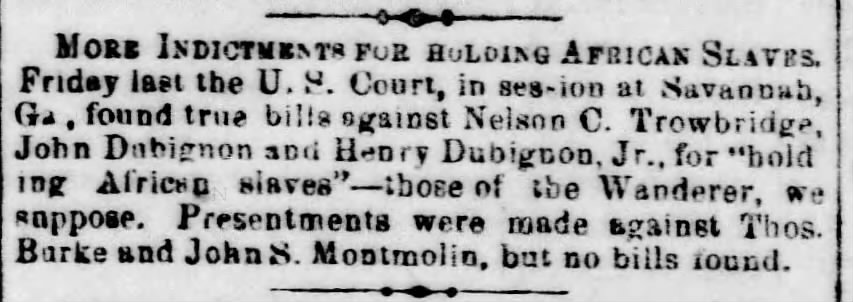
News blurb about the indictments of Trowbridge, John S. Montmollin, the Dubignons of Jekyll Island, and Thomas Burke (The Weekly Democrat, Natchez, Mississippi, May 4, 1859)

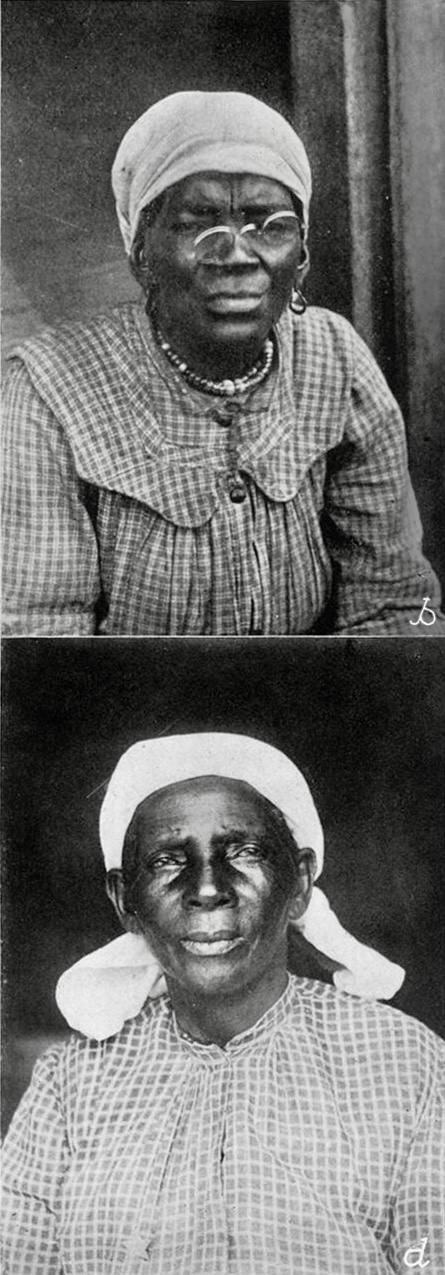
Katie Noble (born Manchuella) and Lucy Lanham - "Survivors of the Slave Yacht Wanderer" published in American Anthropologist (1908)

The "letter book" of Charles Augustus Lamar was rediscovered in 1886 and includes numerous mentions of Trowbridge (sometimes called "Trow"). Lamar and Trowbridge were partners in selling bonds to support a freelance filibuster invasion of Cuba in hopes of bringing it into the Union as another slave state. A letter of 1857 shows that Lamar, Trowbridge, and another New Orleans slave trader named Theodore Johnston were involved in the management of the E. A. Rawlins, which was widely believed to be an illegal transatlantic slave ship, in company with the Richard Cobden and Wanderer. The captain hired to sail the E. A. Rawlins to Africa and back would be paid with "two negroes out of every one hundred that the vessel may land." In November 1859, Lamar griped to Trowbridge: "The Wanderer is going to China, and may return with coolies. They are worth from $340 to $350 each in Cuba, and cost but $12 and their passage. I told you Tucker returned one of the boys sold in Columbus? Sent him to Akin's for my account!!! He is in Joe Bryan's and has had a number of fits. He has the itch, and Joe wants him removed. I don't know what to do with him. No one will take him. He is a dead expense to me." Trowbridge may have been a silent partner in the business, as in 1914, an interview with a survivor of the Wanderer described himself and others trafficked just before the American Civil War as "Lamar's niggers," not naming other investors such as Trowbridge, Johnston, or Nathan Bedford Forrest, etc.

Trowbridge was indicted at the U.S. Circuit Court in Savannah, Georgia in 1859 for "importing and holding slaves". The name of the case was United States vs. Nelson C. Trowbridge. The May 1860 trial ended with a hung jury, and Justice James M. Wayne declared a mistrial.

== American Civil War ==
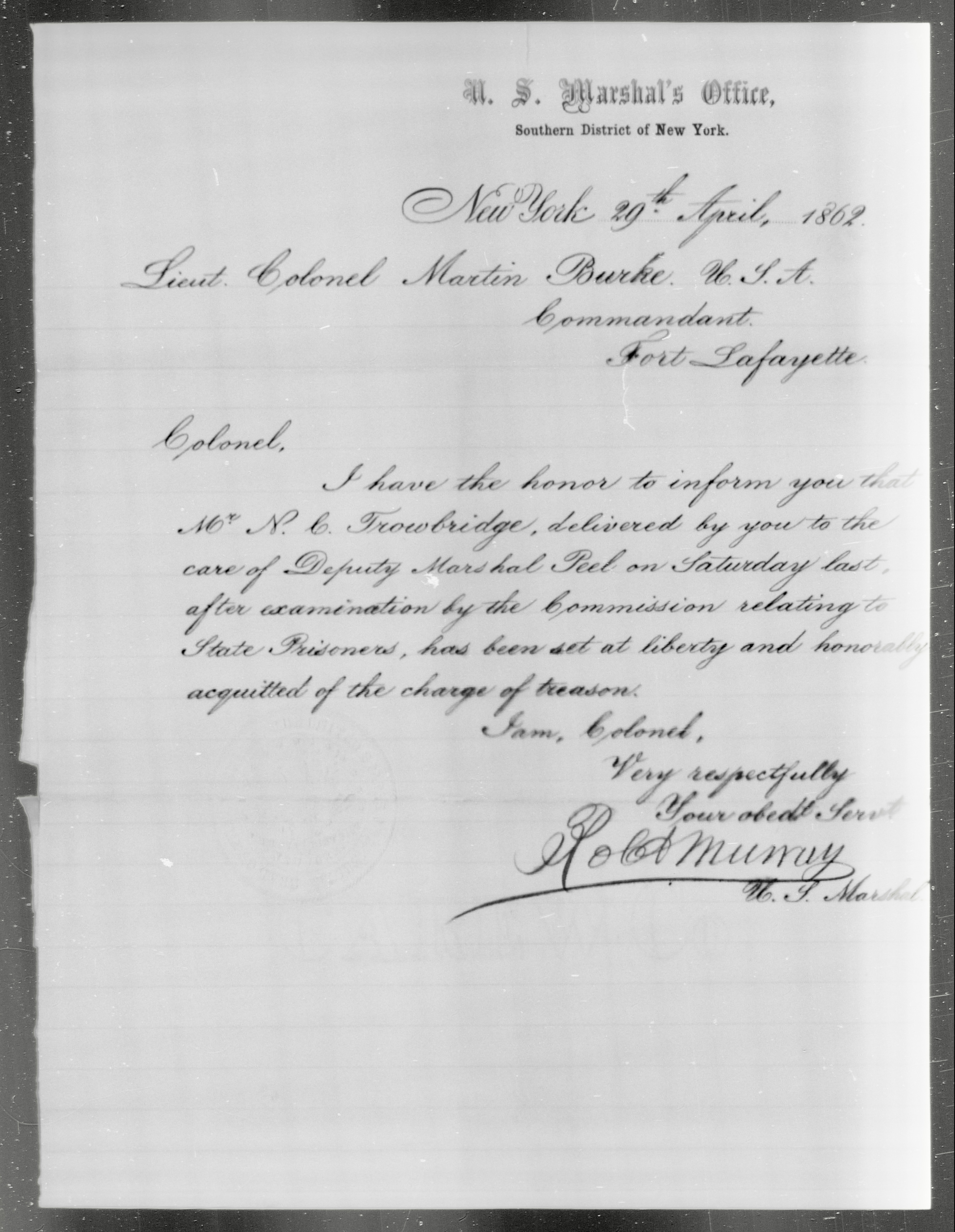
Records related to N. C. Trowbridge: "...honorably acquitted of the charge of treason..." and released from Fort Lafayette on April 29, 1862

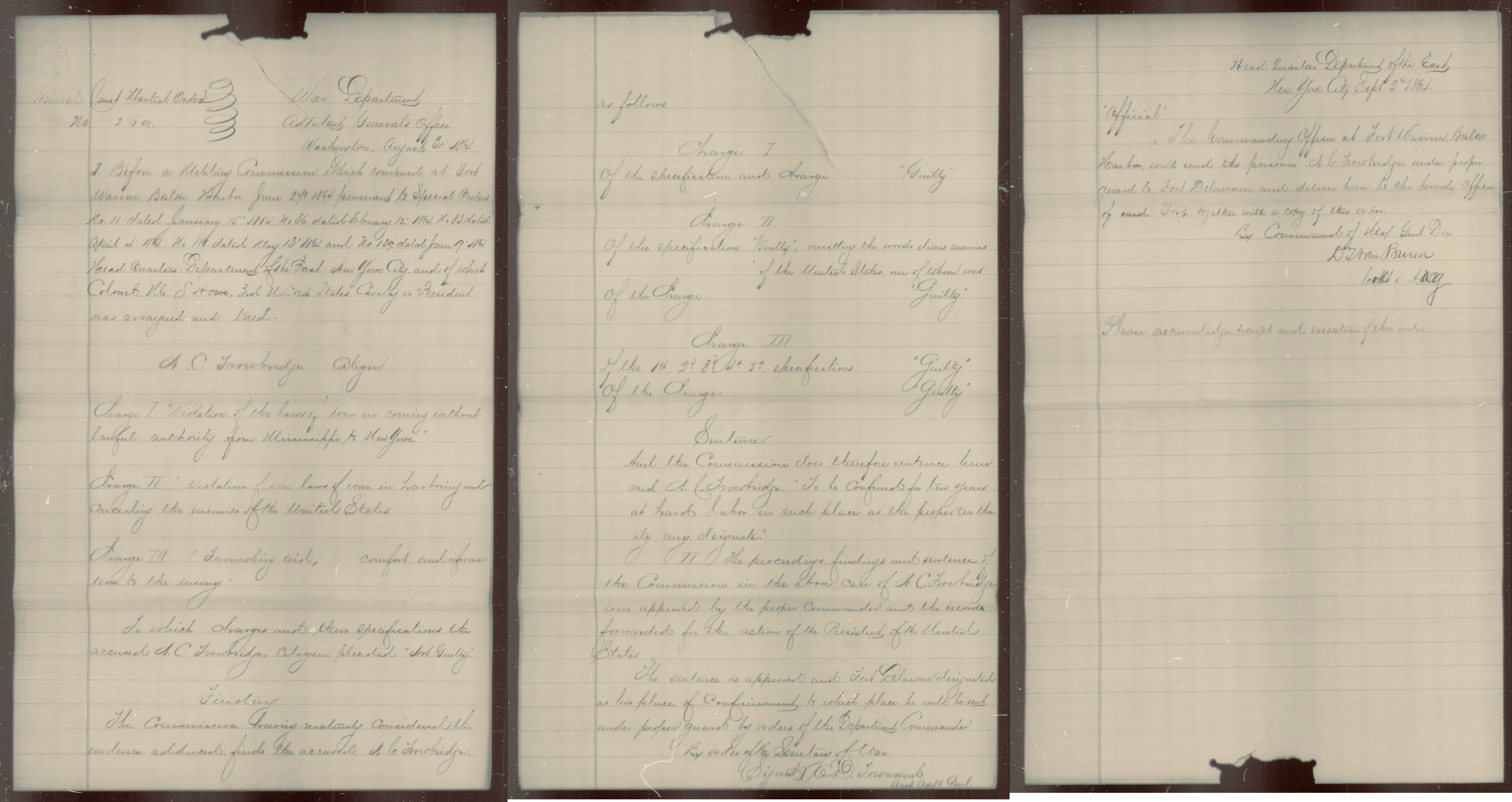
Records related to N. C. Trowbridge: Convicted on all charges of blockade running and treason, August 30, 1864, and remanded to Fort Delaware

On April 23, 1862, Trowbridge was arrested and confined at Fort Lafayette on the orders of the U.S. Secretary of War. On April 29, 1862, having given his "written parole of honor not to render aid or comfort to enemies in enemies in hostility to the United States government" Trowbridge was apparently released from federal custody.

Trowbridge appears in the diary of U.S. secretary of the Navy Gideon Welles, in the entry of December 21, 1863:

I received a large budget of Rebel letters captured onboard the Ceres. Faxon examined and arranged them for publication. An exposure of some which I have read will have a good effect. Returning from an early evening walk, I learned Stanton had called for me, and I went at once to the War Department. Seward and Chase were with him. Stanton read to me a letter which had been written in cipher, but which after two days' labor the experts had unlocked with the exception of a few words. Mention was made of "carrying out the programme" and the intention to seize two steamers. Certain allusions to Briggs, Cavnach, with a conviction on the part of Stanton that the letter was from Trowbridge, and also other points and names struck me as not entirely unfamiliar. The trio had become puzzled, and Stanton called on me to assist, or hear my suggestions. They had come to the conclusion and were confident the 'programme' was to seize one or more of the California steamers, and asked about gunboats. I did not entirely concur in their conclusions and told them the letters captured on the Ceres would furnish some light in regard to the persons alluded to, especially Trowbridge, Briggs, and C.; that I had not read the letters, but parts of several had been read to me and their publication would have a good effect; that they were with the Chief Clerk of the Navy Department, who was to copy and publish portions of them. If, however, Trowbridge was to be arrested, it might be best to suspend publication for the present...Telegrams were sent to Marshal Murray at New York to arrest Trowbridge forthwith, and hold him in close custody, and to Admiral Paulding to place a gunboat in the Narrows and at Throg's Neck to stop all outward-bound steamers that have not a pass."

Trowbridge was arrested again in January 1864 and taken to Fort Warren, a military prison in Massachusetts. He was later transferred to Fort Delaware in Delaware. In January 1864 the New York Herald commented on the "intercepted Rebel correspondence":

The letters from New York will be, perhaps, the most interesting to our readers. They were written by a Mr. N. C. Trowbridge, who appears to have passed last summer at Glen Cove, and who was a frequenter of the Clarendon Hotel. Who in the world is this Trowbridge? Does anybody know anything about him? Is Judge Busteed acquainted with him? Whoever he may be, his letters show that be was a sort of general agent for the rebels. He made his living by speculating in gold, as many other men of his calibre have done, and took a special interest in the purchase of Kentucky colts and Kentucky whiskey. This brand of whiskey was once said to be patronized by General Grant, and Old Abe wanted to send a barrel of it to every general in the army. Perhaps the rebels had some such an idea in regard to its potency and virtue, and desired its aid in their military operations. If so, the whiskey never reached Richmond, as the recent defeats of the rebels conclusively prove...It is very evident that Trowbridge, Cammack and Company were employed here to transmit news to the rebels and to fit out blockade runners. Perhaps this latter part of their business was transacted through their friends in the Custom House. One line in one of the letters very greatly surprises us, however. Trowbridge writes to Charley Lamar: 'I will deliver your message to Dick Busteed.' Now, Busteed is a piloropher, a lawyer, and a patriot of the first water. He has been a brigadier general, and Old Abe recently appointed him to a judgeship in Alabama. What message could the rebel Lamar send to this incorruptible and incomparable loyalist? How dared the rebels be so familiar with him as to call him Dick? How did it happen that he knew Trowbridge, or Trowbridge him, except by reputation? The Senate has not yet confirmed Judge Busteed, and this matter ought to be investigated before any action is taken upon him.

Convicted of blockade running, Trowbridge was sentenced to 10 years of hard labor at Fort Delaware. He was ordered transferred to Clinton Prison on September 13, 1864. Daniel Tompkins Van Buren and John Adams Dix handed down the orders regarding the transfer process. Trowbridge apparently escaped from Fort Lafayette in fall 1864. He was later described as a "notorious...rebel spy and emissary." He later applied for a presidential pardon, sometimes called the Confederate amnesty program. After the American Civil War, a witness testified to investigators for the U.S. Congress that N. C. Trowbridge was one of the brokers who helped them buy ships for cotton smuggling from the Confederate states.

== Later life ==
Trowbridge was listed as a principal of Trowbridge & Co. (N. C. & J. Trowbridge), a dry goods, hardware, seed, and agricultural implement store located at 821 Main St. in Poughkeepsie, New York.

At the time of the 1870 census, Trowbridge was retired and living in New York City. He and his wife had a declared combined net worth of $32,500. In 1879 Trowbridge signed a petition in Madison County, Mississippi recommending a pardon for "Jeff. Pitman" on charges of "shooting with intent to kill" because of "The extreme youth of the prisoner, and his uniform good character as a peaceable, quiet and industrious man. Besides, the evidence was uncertain and contrary, and very grave doubts are entertained as to his actual guilt." Trowbridge died in Canton, Mississippi in 1879, and is buried in Magnolia Cemetery in Augusta, Georgia.

== Personal life ==
In 1836, Trowbridge married Evalina T. Olive in Richmond, Georgia. In 1864 a Vermont newspaper described him as marrying "a Southern lady and a nigger plantation." They had five children, most of whom lived in New York City as of 1908. Trowbridge's wife was involved with the Horticultural Club of Poughkeepsie in 1860.

== Additional images ==
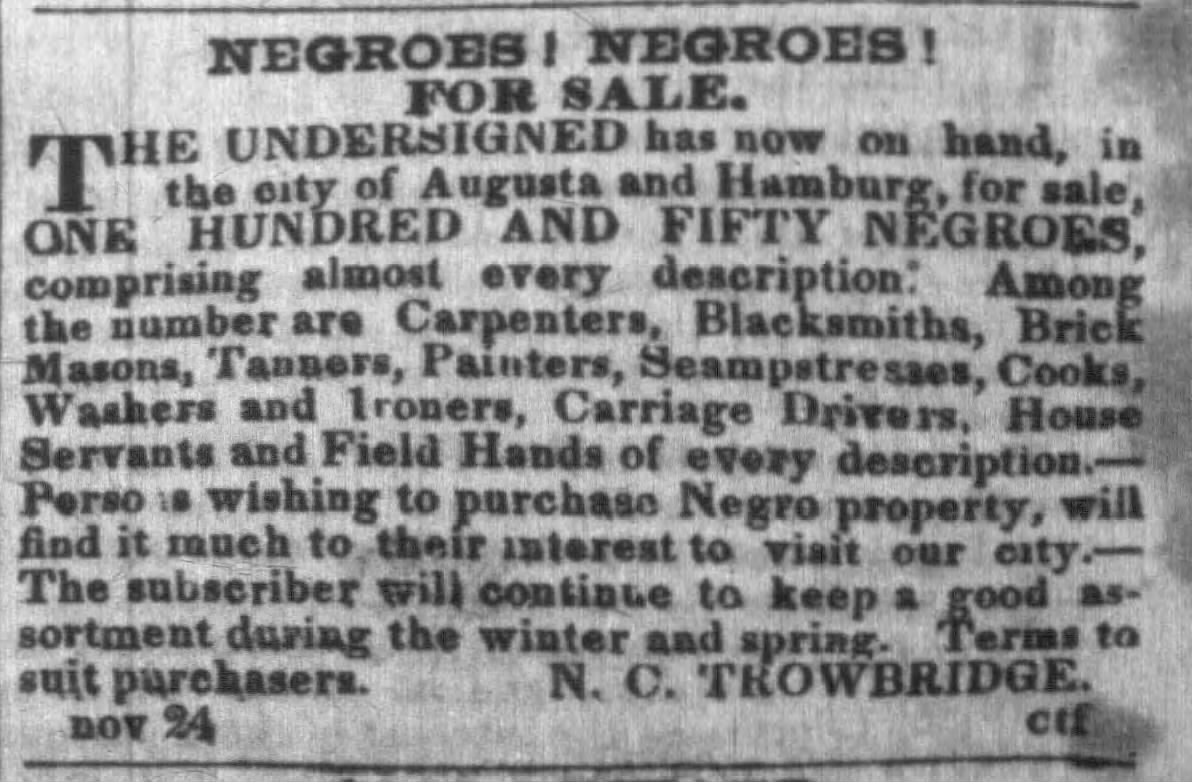
"Negroes! Negroes! For Sale" (The Daily Constitutionalist and Republic, Augusta, Georgia, March 21, 1851)

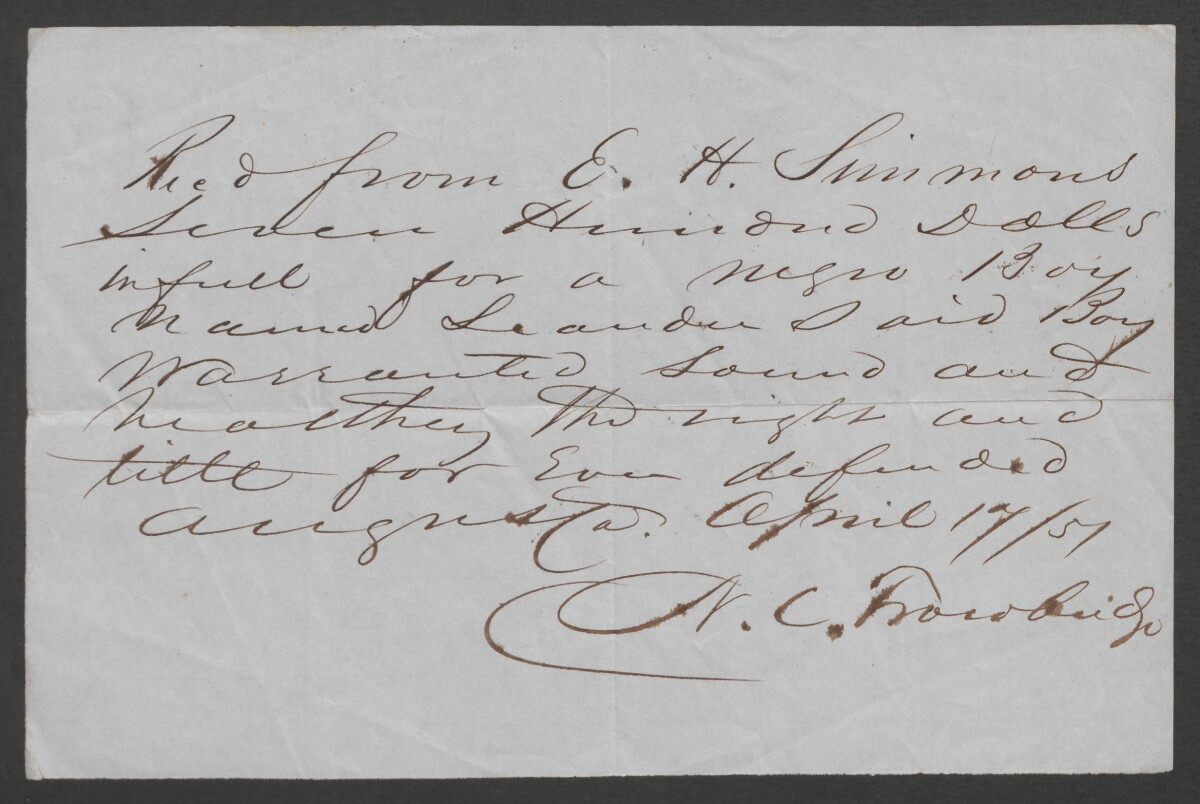
Bill of sale for Leander, an enslaved person, from N. C. Trowbridge to E. H. Simmons, 1851 in Augusta, Georgia (Duke University Libraries Digital)

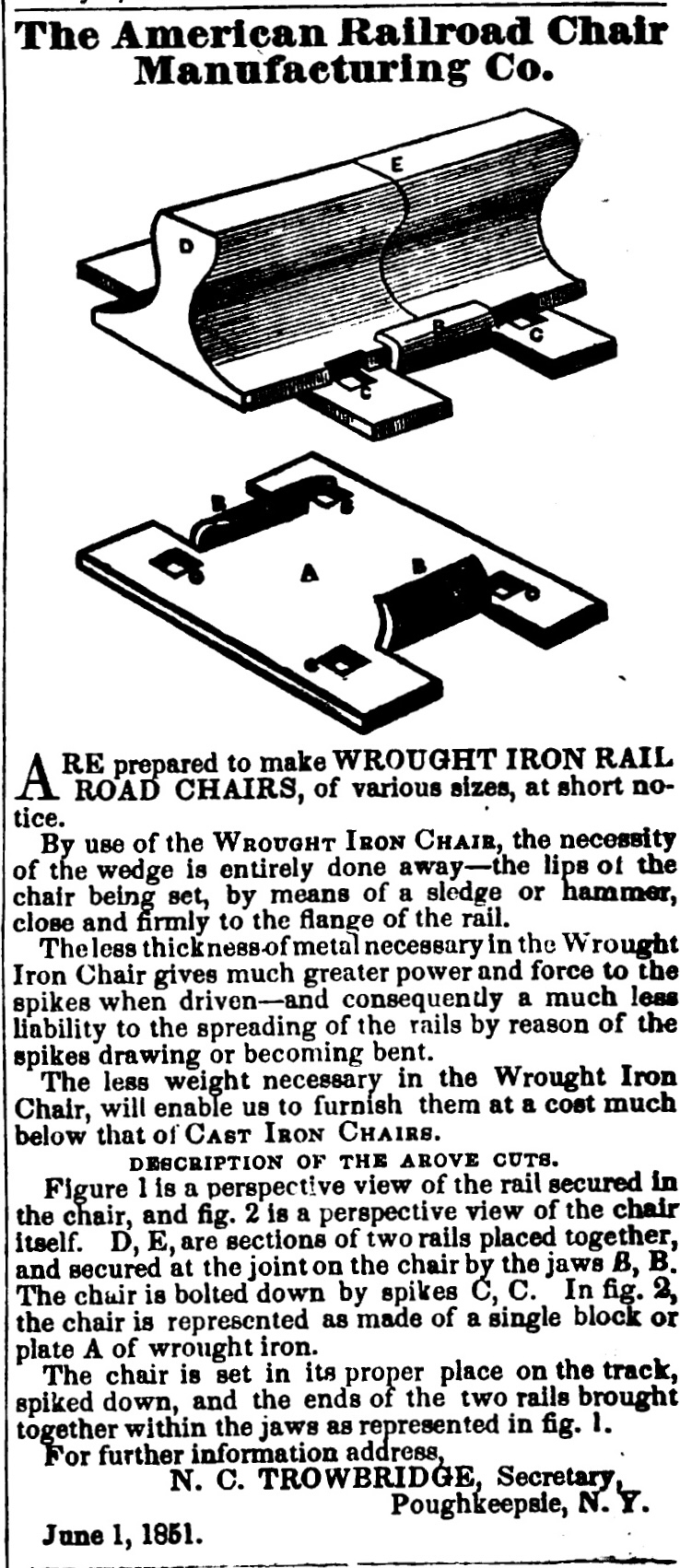
American Railroad Chair Manufacturing Co. 1851

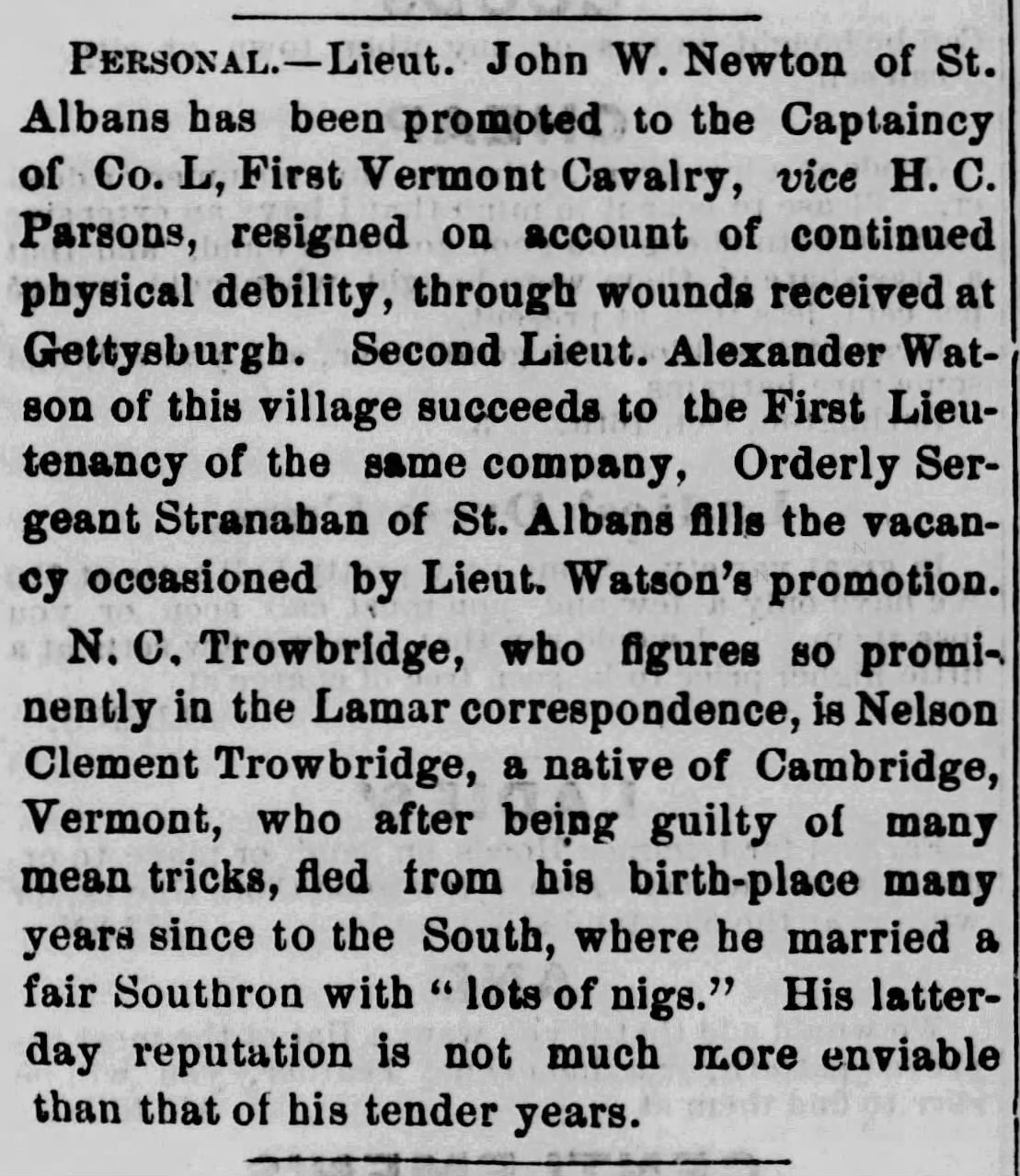
"Personal." The Burlington Times, Vermont, January 19, 1864

== See also ==
- John S. Montmollin – American slave trader and banker (1808–1859), also involved with the Wanderer
- Bernard Kendig – American slave trader (~1813–1872), born Pennsylvania
- Ziba B. Oakes – American slave trader (1807–1871), born Maine
- List of slave traders of the United States
- List of Georgia slave traders
- Slave markets and slave jails in the United States
- Bibliography of the slave trade in the United States

== Sources ==
- n.a. (November 1886). "A Slave-Trader's Letter-Book". The North American Review. 143 (360): 447–461. ISSN 0029-2397. JSTOR 25101128.
- NARA (n.d.). "The Wanderer: a finding aid" (PDF). National Archives Southeast Region.
- Tadman, Michael (1996) [1989]. Speculators and Slaves: Masters, Traders, and Slaves in the Old South (2nd ed.). University of Wisconsin Press. ISBN 9780299118549. OCLC 34825947.
- Trowbridge, Francis Bacon (1908). The Trowbridge Genealogy: History of the Trowbridge Family in America. New Haven, Connecticut: Tuttle, Morehouse & Taylor. LCCN 09000552. OCLC 6175654. OL 7003948M.
