= E. H. Simmons =

American slave trader (c. 1815–c. 1852)

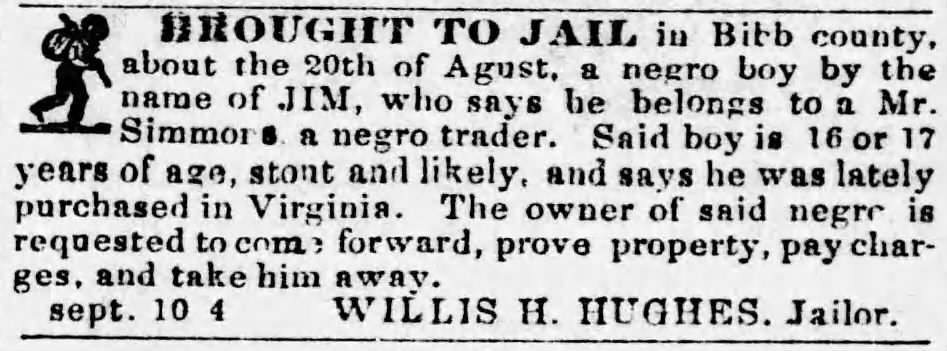
- "Brought to Jail in Bibb County" Macon Weekly Telegraph, Georgia, September 10, 1850
- Born: c. 1815; United States
- Died: Between August and December 1852; Vicinity of Columbus, Georgia, United States (?)

Elmore H. Simmons (c. 1815 – c. 1852), generally signing documents as E. H. Simmons, was an American slave trader. He is primarily known from receipts for purchases and sales of slaves that are held in various slavery document collections held in U.S. libraries. Simmons was active as a slave trader from 1847 until 1852 in the U.S. states of Virginia, North Carolina, South Carolina, and Georgia.

== Biography ==
According to the 1850 U.S. census, Simmons was probably born around 1815. He began working as a slave trader by 1847, as the E. L. McGlashan Collection of Documents Concerning Slavery in the United States at the Beinecke Rare Book & Manuscript Library at Yale has a receipt for Simmons' purchase of Zena on May 25, 1847, from William Perry at Richmond, and the purchase of an enslaved man named Moses for $500 from D. M. Miller, "commission" salesman, somewhere in one of the Richmond, Virginia slave markets on June 5, 1847. The McGlashan collection also has a receipt for the sale of 21-year-old Priscilla to Simmons by Benjamin Sumner of Lincoln County, North Carolina, on October 6, 1849.

The special collections department of the Washington and Lee University libraries holds five slave receipts for purchases made by Simmons:

- June 18, 1847: Charity, $87.50
- March 1, 1850: Agnes, 16 years old, $600
- June 8, 1850: Alfred, 13 years old, $500
- April 29, 1852: Billy, 17 years old, $700
- August 7, 1852: Caroline, 19 years old, $890

In 2009, an auction of Americana in Connecticut included a slave sale receipt from Hugh Hogare (sp?) of Richmond, Virginia, for $375 paid by Simmons for an enslaved man named John on June 26, 1849.

In 2023, an auction house offered a slave receipt for the sale by G. W. Williams of Richmond of an enslaved man named Ryal to Simmons for $525, on November 19, 1851.

In March 2024, the Swann Galleries auctioned off a set of slave sale receipts, two of which included the name E. H. Simmons:

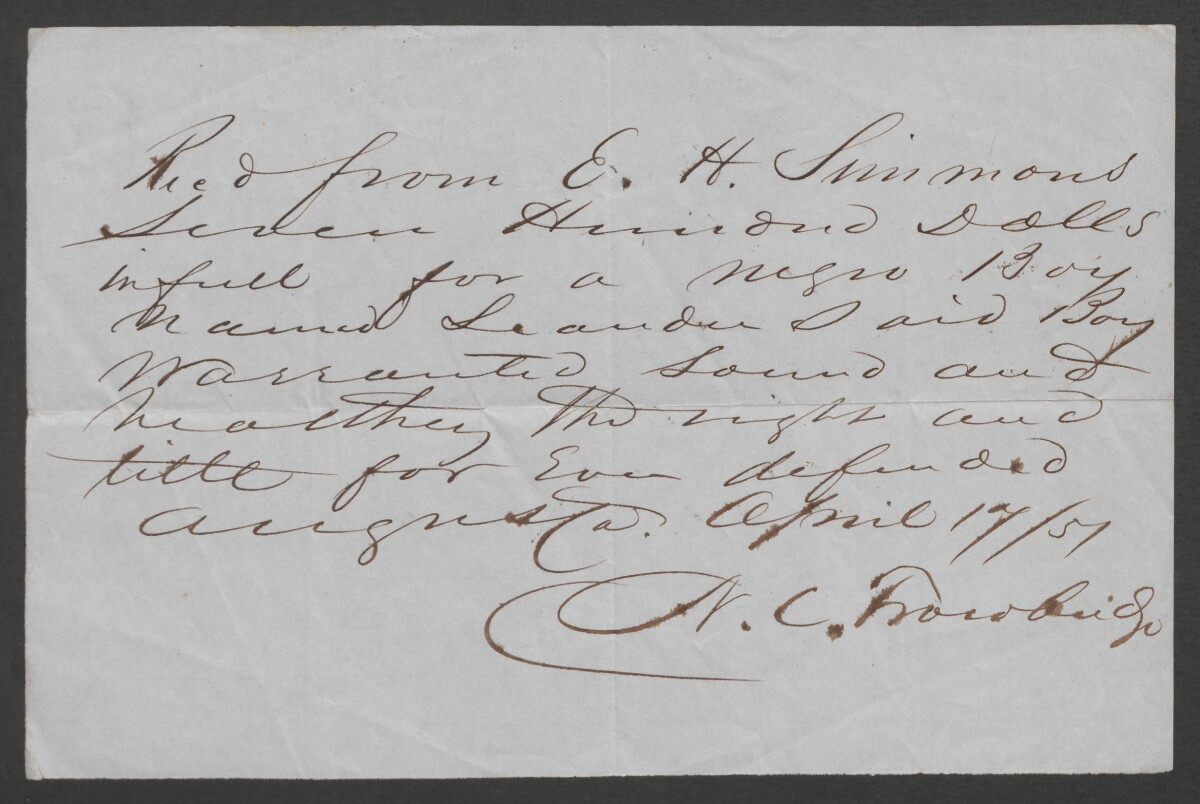
N. C. Trowbridge sold Leander to Simmons in 1851—slave trading was illegal within Georgia until 1856, so slave traders like Trowbridge operated at Hamburg, South Carolina, just across the Savannah River from Augusta, Georgia

- At the Hamburg, South Carolina slave market trader N. C. Trowbridge sold nine people to Simmons on February 3, 1850. These people were identified as "Preston, Lewis, King, Susan, Sarah, Francis, Sally, Jane & child."
- On August 5, 1857 [1851?], Simmons bought four nine-year-old boys and a seven-year-old boy from W. B. Rhem of Lenoir County, North Carolina. The boys were named Fred, Sippio, Moses, John, and Lewis.

Duke University libraries holds another slave sale receipt showing a business relationship between Trowbridge and Simmons, which states that the latter paid the former $700 for Leander, age 13, on April 17, 1851. Another receipt held by Yale shows that Simmons bought "four Negro slaves...Betsy and her three children...Rachel, Clea, and Eliza" from the traders Bernard M. Campbell and Walter L. Campbell at their Baltimore slave jail for $1,000, on September 4, 1851.

Simmons was enumerated as a resident of Harris County, Georgia at the time of the 1850 U.S. census. He appears to have been boarding with the Lowe family. The head of the household, Henry H. Lowe, listed his occupation as farmer, and told the enumerator that he owned real estate valued at US$250,000 (equivalent to $9,449,000 in 2024). Lowe had previously served as a Georgia state legislator and militia officer, and his slaves had built a landmark plantation house called Ossahatchie at Waverly Hall in the 1830s. The census enumerator listed Simmons' birthplace as unknown, and his occupation as "negro trader." Simmons was listed as the legal owner of 68 slaves on the 1850 slave schedule, while Lowe, his nearest neighbor, legally owned scores more people, collectively bound to at least two distinct plantations in the Harris County area.

In December 1852, Lowe sought letters of administration in Harris County for the estate of Elmore H. Simmons, deceased, notice of which was published in a Columbus, Georgia, newspaper. A second notice, about the planned closure of Simmons' estate, was published in a Columbus newspaper in December 1855.

== See also ==
- History of slavery in Georgia § Domestic slave trade
