= Wanderer (slave ship) =

American vessel, 1858–1871

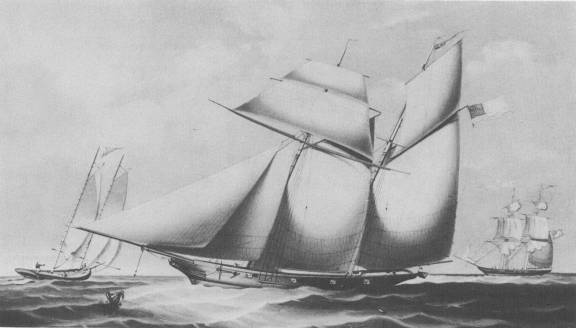
- Wanderer in US Navy service during the American Civil War (1861–1865), after being used once in the slave trade and for mercantile trade.

History

United States
- Name: Wanderer
- Launched: 1858
- Fate: Lost 12 January 1871
- Notes: Slave trade and mercantile service 1857–61; US Navy service 1861–65; Mercantile service 1865–71

General characteristics
- Displacement: 300 tons
- Length: 106 ft 0 in (32.31 m)
- Beam: 25 ft 6 in (7.77 m)
- Draught: 9 ft 6 in (2.90 m)
- Propulsion: Sails
- Sail plan: Schooner-rigged
- Speed: 20 knots (37 km/h; 23 mph)

Wanderer was the penultimate documented ship to bring an illegal cargo of enslaved people from Africa to the United States, landing at Jekyll Island, Georgia, on November 28, 1858. It was the last to carry a large cargo, arriving with some 400 people. Clotilda, which transported 110 people from Dahomey in 1860, is the last known ship to bring enslaved people from Africa to the US.

Originally built in New York as a pleasure schooner, Wanderer was purchased by Southern businessman Charles Augustus Lafayette Lamar and an investment group, and used in a conspiracy to import kidnapped people illegally. The Atlantic slave trade had been prohibited under US law since 1808. An estimated 409 enslaved people survived the voyage from the Kingdom of Kongo to Georgia. Reports of the smuggling outraged the North. The federal government prosecuted Lamar and other investors, the captain and crew in 1860, but failed to win a conviction.

During the American Civil War, Union forces confiscated the ship and used it for various military roles. It was decommissioned in 1865, converted to merchant use, and lost off Cuba in 1871. Lamar himself would later become the last Confederate soldier to be killed in action during the war.

In November 2008, the Jekyll Island Museum unveiled an exhibit dedicated to the enslaved Africans on Wanderer. That month also marked the unveiling of a memorial sculpture on southern Jekyll Island dedicated to the enslaved people who were landed there.

== Summary ==
The trans-Atlantic slave trade was made illegal by both Britain and the United States in 1807, with the two laws coming into effect on 1 May 1807 and 1 January 1808, respectively. The Royal Navy started intercepting illegal slave traders off the coast of Africa in 1807, but serious enforcement activity started in 1808 with the establishment of the West Africa Squadron The British also worked to persuade other nations to end their involvement in slave trading. At the same time, the British began exerting pressure on the African rulers to stop exporting people as slaves. In contrast, the United States made little effort to enforce their legislation until 1820 and 1821, when US naval ships patrolled the West African coast. A level of local co-operation was achieved between the two navies, but the US persisted in forbidding Royal Navy ships to board slavers flying the American flag. Consequently, US colors were a means by which slavers of many nations avoided interception. US Navy ships were next involved in anti-slavery patrols off Africa in 1842 as a result of the Webster–Ashburton Treaty, but with limited effect.

After the US outlawed the transatlantic slave trade, people continued to buy slaves in Africa and bring them to the US. As sectional tensions rose in the late 1850s, there was growing sentiment among some Southerners to reopen the slave trade. The Wanderer was built in 1857 and in 1858 it was partially outfitted for a long voyage. There was considerable speculation about the ship's projected use; it was inspected in New York harbor. As there was no conclusive evidence that it was to be used as a slave ship, it was allowed to pass. It departed flying the pennant of the New York Yacht Club and under command of Captain Corrie.

When the Wanderer stopped in Charleston, South Carolina, on its way to Africa, its mission was so well known that it was greeted with a cannon salute.

Corrie sailed to the mouth of the Congo River in the Kingdom of Kongo (present-day Democratic Republic of the Congo), which was then a Portuguese protectorate with a long-established slave market. For a period of 10 days, he had shelves and pens built into the hold in order to accept a shipment of 490–600 people, who were loaded on the ship. Most of the group were Kikongo speakers. Many of the people died on the six-week journey across the Atlantic Ocean. Wanderer reached Jekyll Island, Georgia on November 28, 1858, delivering 409 enslaved people alive.

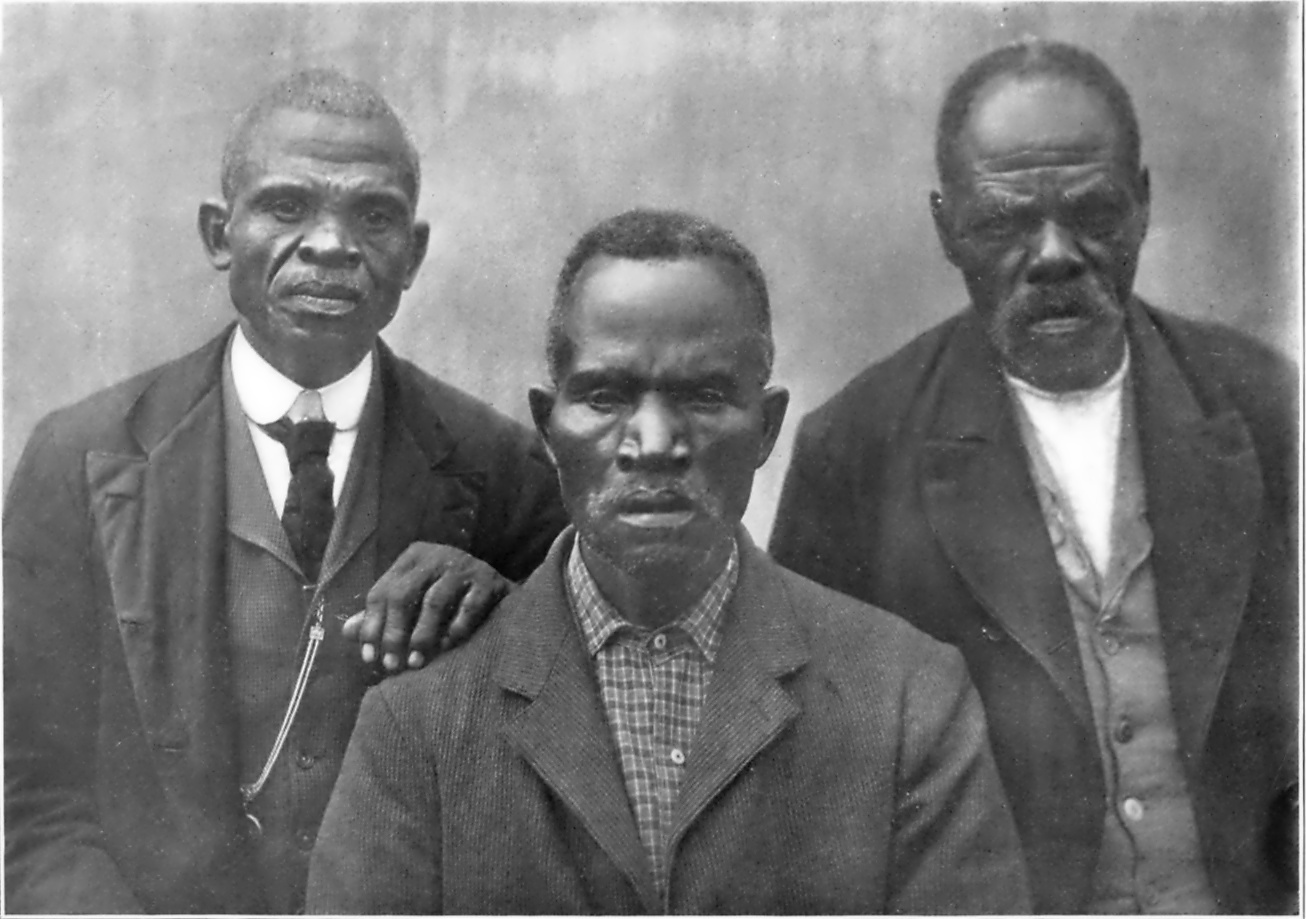
Ward Lee, Tucker Henderson, and Romeo – born Cilucängy, Pucka Gaeta, and Tahro in the Congo River basin, photographed 1908

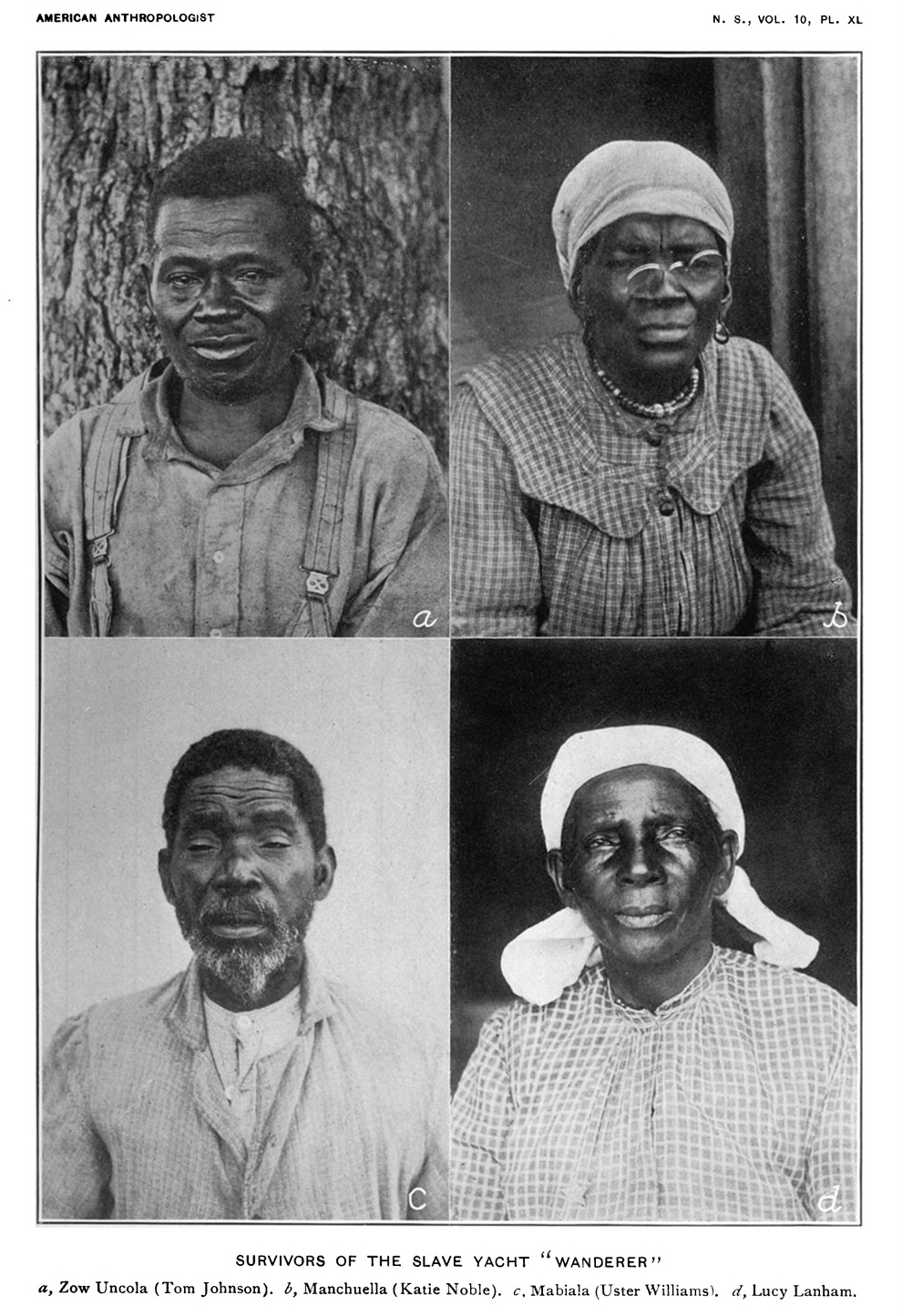
Wanderer survivors Tom Johnson, Katie Noble, Uster Williams, Lucy Lanham, photographed 1908

A prosecution of the slave traders was launched, but the defendants were acquitted by the jury in Georgia. The outrage aroused by the case is believed to have contributed to increasing sectional tensions and the American Civil War. The US District judge, John Nicoll, was the father-in-law of Charles A. L. Lamar. The US prosecutor, Henry R. Jackson, became a major general in the Confederate States Army. Defendants John Egbert Farnum and Lamar served as officers on each side of the conflict. Farnum became a colonel and brevet brigadier general in the Union Army. Lamar organized the 7th Georgia Battalion, and later served at the Battle of Columbus. He was the last officer to be killed in the Civil War. Also among the defendants was John Frederick Tucker, a planter and one of the owners of the ship through the investment group.

During the war, the ship was seized by Union troops and used for the Naval blockade of the Confederate States of America.

== Background ==
Wanderer was built in a Setauket, New York (Long Island), shipyard in 1857 as a pleasure craft yacht for Colonel John Johnson. The vessel's streamlined design allowed the ship to achieve speeds of up to 20 knots (37 km/h; 23 mph), making Wanderer one of the fastest ships of the day. While on a trip to New Orleans, Johnson stopped in Charleston, South Carolina. Later, upon his return to New York, Johnson sold the Wanderer to William C. Corrie of Charleston.

Corrie became a partner with wealthy businessman and cotton planter Charles Augustus Lafayette Lamar (son of Gazaway Bugg Lamar) from Savannah, Georgia. He was hired to transport slaves from Africa, although such importation had been prohibited since 1808 by federal law. Corrie achieved some elements of conversion, but much of the work was accomplished after the ship reached an Angolan port. Both men opposed the restrictions on importing slaves, as demand drove a high price for domestic slaves. The Wanderer was returned to New York to undergo preparation for a long voyage.

Some observers accused the shipyard of preparing it as a slave ship. The ship was inspected and cleared on its voyage out. Public rumors of the ship's being involved in the slave trade persisted and were permanently associated with her name.

== Arrival at Jekyll Island and publicity ==
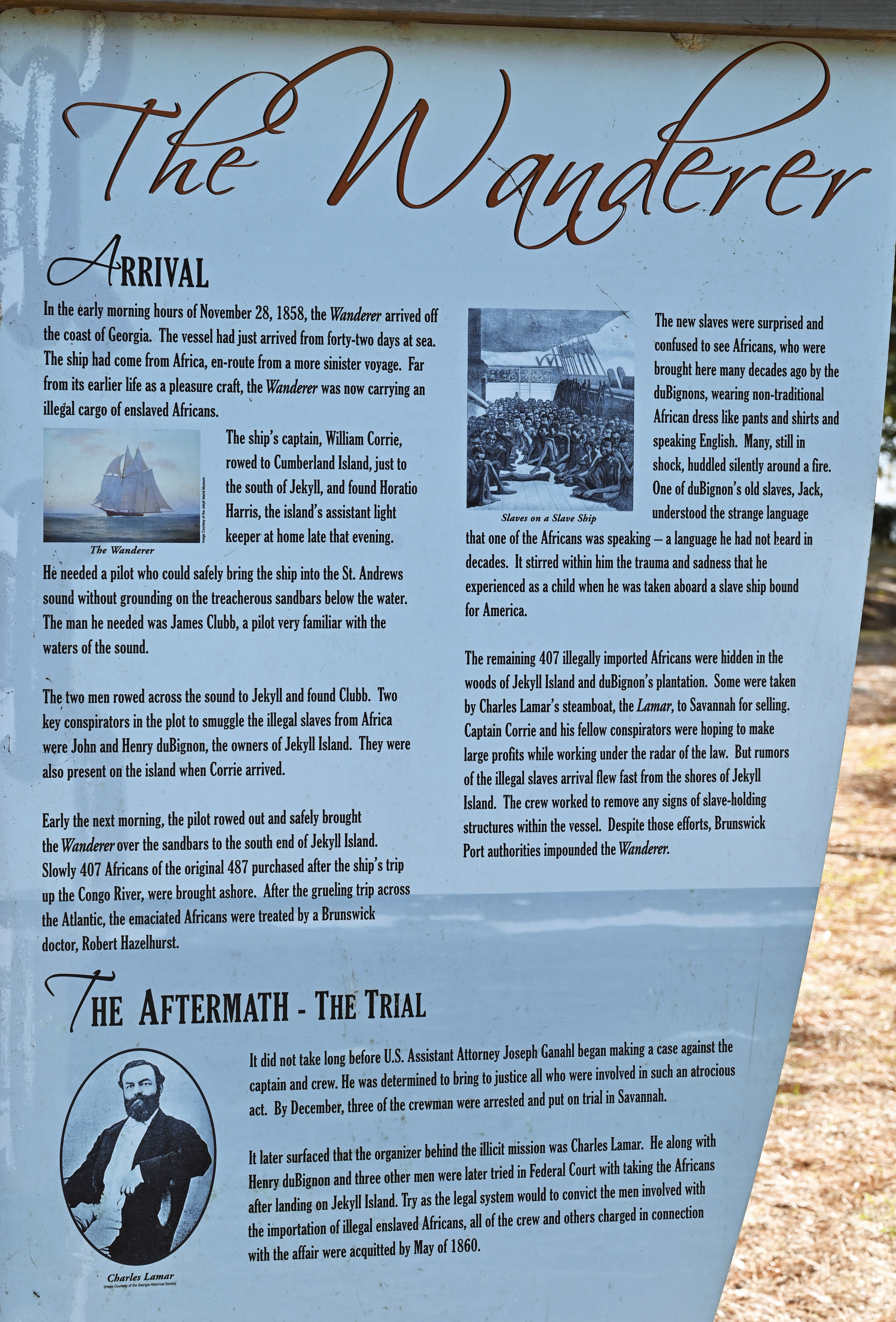
Sign on Jekyll Island, side 1

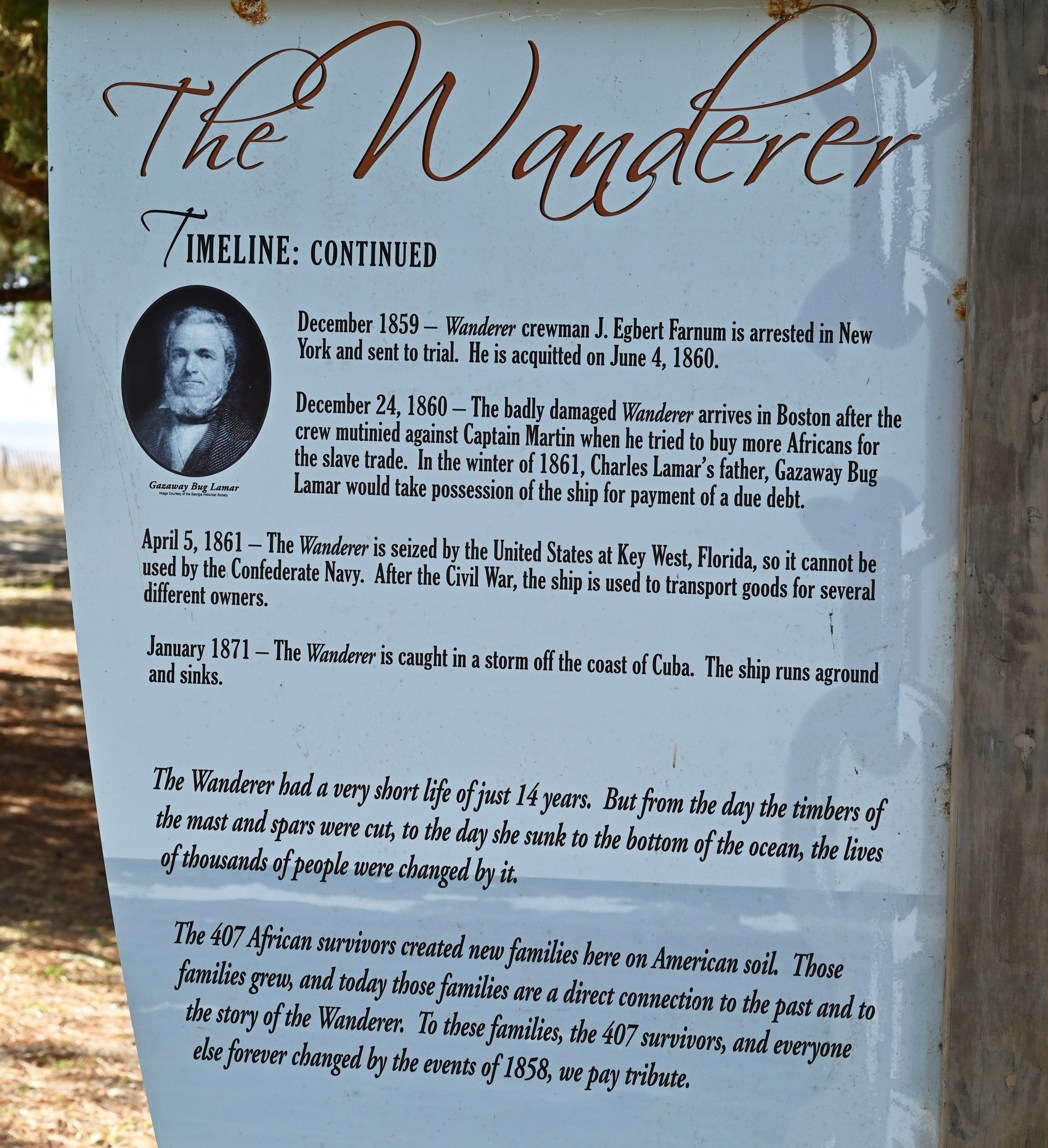
Sign on Jekyll Island, side 2

In his ship's log, Corrie noted arriving at Bengula (probably Benguela in present-day Angola) on October 4, 1858. Wanderer took on 487 slaves between the Congo and Benguela, which is located forty miles south of the Congo River. After a six-week return voyage across the Atlantic, Wanderer arrived at Jekyll Island, Georgia, around sunset on November 28, 1858. The tally sheets and passenger records showed that 409 slaves survived the passage. They were landed at Jekyll Island, which was owned by John and Henry DuBignon Jr., who conspired with Lamar. These figures present a slightly higher mortality rate than the estimated average of 12 percent during the illegal trading era. Hoping to evade arrest, Lamar had the slaves shipped to markets in Savannah and Augusta, Georgia, South Carolina, and Florida.

As the federal government investigated, news of the slave ship raised outrage in the North. Southerners pressed Congress to reopen the Atlantic trade. The federal government tried Lamar and his conspirators three times for piracy in Savannah, Georgia but was unable to get a conviction, possibly due to the jury composed of only white, Southern men. There has also been speculation that one of the judges in the case was Lamar's father-in-law.

However, Lamar and three other men were later arrested after trying to break another codefendant out of jail. They all later pleaded guilty to charges of attempting to rescue their. Each of them were sentenced to 30 days in jail and fined $250.

== Buchanan administration ==
The arrival of Wanderer prompted the Buchanan administration to strengthen the United States' role in anti-slave-trade efforts. Following the dispersion and sale of the 400 Africans throughout the South, there were rumors of subsequent slave ship landings in the region. The Buchanan Administration sent a "secret agent" named Benjamin F. Slocum on a two-month journey to search for evidence.

Slocum, working undercover, spoke with slave traders, plantation owners, and townspeople, hunting down every possible lead. In the end he delivered a detailed report, in which he concluded that the rumors of subsequent landings, "were founded upon the movements of the Wanderer negroes, or else they were mere fabrications, manufactured and circulated for political effect, or to fill a column in a sensation newspaper."

Based on that investigation, Buchanan reported to Congress on December 3, 1860, that "since the date of my last inaugural message not a single slave has been imported into the United States in violation of the laws prohibiting the African slave trade."

== Known survivors of the transport ==
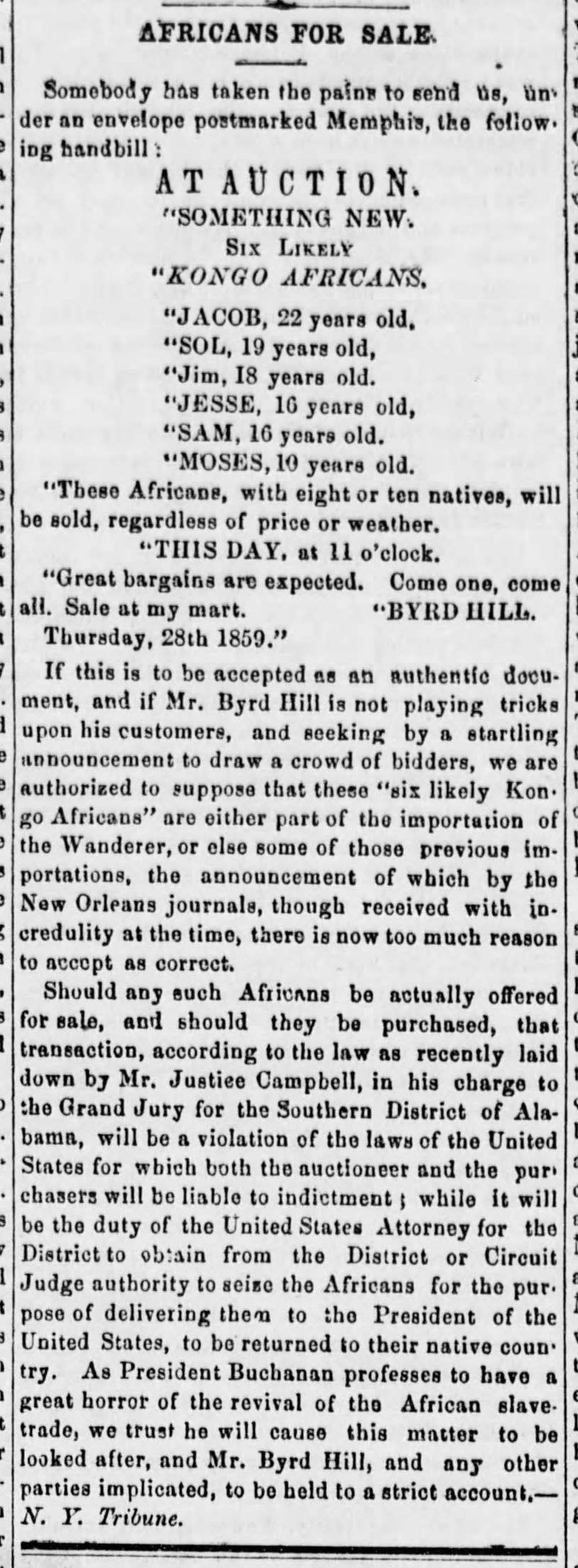
"Africans for sale" listed by long-time slave trader Byrd Hill were believed to be part of the Wanderer cargo

Names and descriptions of some of the survivors of the Wanderer are known. Some of the people transported on the Wanderer spoke the Yoruba language, were abducted "from some towns west of Abeckuta, by Dahomey slave hunters," and had been sold at Porto Nevo. Many had chest, arm and thigh tattoos, and some their teeth sharpened so they looked like of the blade of a saw. Their captors noted that some of the stolen people referred to whiskey as melapho.

According to Capt. A. C. McGhee, said to be a co-owner of the Wanderer, "They possessed many tricks of catching small animals and reptiles. One would stand in the middle of a field and make a peculiar noise with his mouth, which would attract a cloud of grassohppers. Catching them on the wing in his open hands he would devour them with great gusto. Raccoons, opossum, hares, and even skunks were regarded as great delicacies, and some of the older ones had a knack of catching and eating rattlesnakes." Another account claimed, "It was difficult to teach them to eat cooked food and use salt. They were expert swimmers, and caught fish with their hands, feeling In holes for them after deep diving." A third account reported that a number of survivors later committed suicide under the belief that "if they would jump into the sea and drown themselves they would be carried back to Africa by the good spirits...among them being one called King Mingo, who decoyed two children to St. Simon's beach, during the absence of his mistress, and all three of them jumped from a high bluff Into the swift current and were drowned."

McGhee also claimed that the Wanderer was used for two separate slave cargoes but only was caught the once. (Former governor of South Carolina D. C. Heyward believed that Lamar had also imported slaves from Africa to the United States on the E. A. Rawlins and Richard Cobden.) In 1859 the Augusta Sentinel reported that "it is quietly hinted that this is the third cargo loaded by the company in the last six months." A news account from 1914 claimed that the Wanderer had landed a total of 1350 people from at least two separate slave-buying voyages.

- Between 270 and 277 of the human cargo were delivered to a South Carolina plantation at the confluence of Horse Creek and the Savannah River.
- A wagon carrying 36 enslaved people from the Wanderer were spotted in a wagon in Worth County, Georgia, held captive in the county jail in Jacksonville, Ga. for a week and then released for lack of direction from the feds. When captured, they were in the custody of Richard F. Aiken, "a prominent Savannah citizen."
- Old Gazemba or Lazemba, "Lazemba had a bunch of grass behind each ear, and carried a small calabash or gourd on which he blew at the end of every hour with perfect regularity day and night, though not guided by watch or clock. He was given the freedom of the ship, while the others were kept between decks."
- Julius Lemons
- "a king and a conjuror of wonderful power"
- Peter, one of "over one hundred of these people living in the counties of Montgomery, Lowdnes, Dallas and Mobile"
- Lucius Williams, born Umwalla in Guinea; "He is not lonesome here, for on a neighboring plantation, Captain Benjamin Tillman's place, are many negroes from his old home, and they frequently meet and converse in African."
- Peter and Robert Du Bignon of Jekyll Island, Georgia; "there's a few over to St. Simon's and upcountry"
- A group of 169 were taken by investor John P. Tucker to his lands, called the Drakee plantation, 9 mi (14 km) above Savannah.
- A number of survivors were said to have been hidden away on an island on the Savannah River; Savannah slave trader John S. Montmollin, whose descendants claimed was the originator of the Wanderer scheme, was killed in a steamship boiler explosion "within a short distance of the spot where his captives had been incarcerated" on an island in the Savannah River. A neighbor of Montmollin took 21 of this group and sold them on to South Carolina.
- Thomas Lanham, transported to Edgefield County, South Carolina; according to a descendant, "He was stolen using a red piece of cloth which was a payment in Africa. In Africa you worked for cloth and you bartered and traded with it. So, they waved a piece of cloth which was almost sort of like an ad 'come work.'"
- Tom and Clementina of Brunswick, Georgia
- "Captain Urbanus Dart had one in his employ on the steamer Pope Catlin who was the son of a Wanderer woman, and who was one of the best cooks on the coast."
- "Mr. McGee says that many of them died from grief at being torn from their home and country. I well remember seeing some of them at work in Col. Mott's garden in Columbus, and my heart bled for them then, for they looked forlorn and miserable. They could not speak nor understand our language and had to work by signs. Of course they became weaned in time and took wives and reared children, and occasionally we find some of these and their children here and there in our state and they rejoice that they were brought from their native land to this country."

== Victims of the passage ==
At least 80 enslaved people died on the Wanderer. According to one account, well over 800 people were packed into the Wanderer, vastly more than the ship was meant to carry, and fewer than 500 landed in the United States. Some of the deaths were because "between Cuba and Jekyll island a vessel was sighted which was believed to be in chase of her by the officers of the Wanderer. Hurriedly as many negroes as could be forced between the hatches were crowded below and weights were fastened to those remaining and they were heaved overboard. The exact number thus massacred is not known."

== Wanderer's later career ==
During the next two years, ownership of Wanderer changed several times.

In November 1859 the ship sailed again on another slaving expedition, by a crew of 27 "stealing" the vessel from its owner, with the apparent connivance of port officials. According to one report, it sailed in broad daylight, with hundreds looking on; according to another, it left between midnight and 1 AM. The owner, who was suspected of participating or approving, attempted to chase it on another ship, "but he was like the Irishman looking for a day's work, and praying that he might not find it". Near the coast of Africa, the first mate led a mutiny and left her captain at sea in a small boat. The mate said he had been forced onto the ship and prevented from getting off. He sailed Wanderer to Fire Island, then Boston, Massachusetts. After he arrived at Boston on 24 December 1859, the mate turned her over to federal authorities, and 10 men were imprisoned; those who had been forced onto the ship were released.

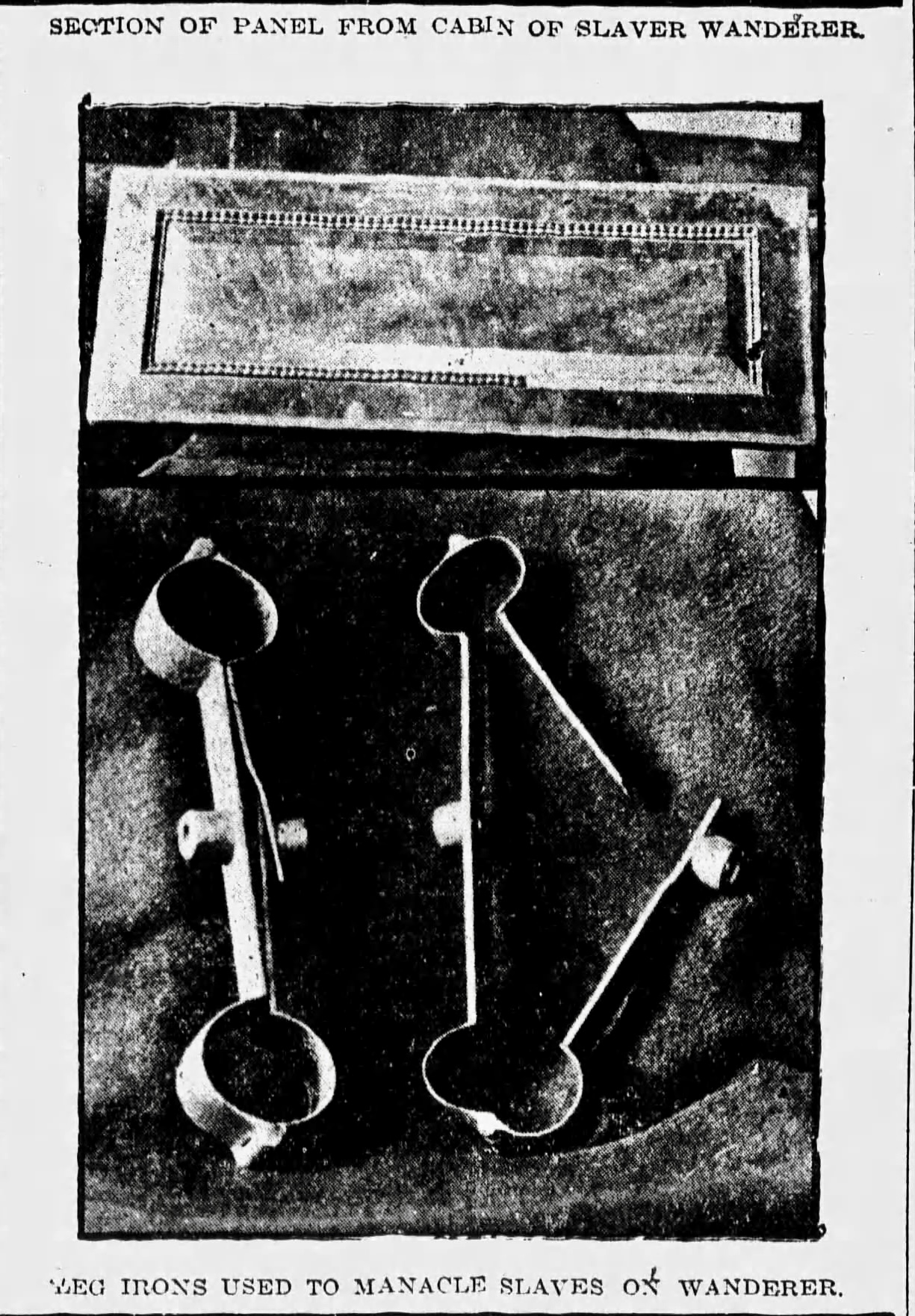
Leg irons used to manacle slaves on Wanderer, kept at office of South Marine Railway (Sun-Journal of Lewiston, Maine, May 28, 1921)

In April 1861, upon the outbreak of the American Civil War, the United States Government seized Wanderer to prevent her from falling into the hands of the Confederate States of America. She served in the United States Navy from then until June 1865, being used as a gunboat, a tender, and a hospital ship. After she had been sold into mercantile service in June 1865, Wanderer operated commercially until on 12 January 1871, when she was lost off Cape Maisí, Cuba.

== Legacy and commemoration ==
Most historians long believed that Wanderer was the last slave ship to reach the US, including W. E. B. Du Bois, in his book The Suppression of the African Slave-Trade to the United States of America, 1638–1870. But the schooner Clotilda landed slaves in 1860 and is the last known slave ship to bring captives to the US.

In 2008, the state of Georgia erected a monument to Wanderer's African survivors on the south tip of Jekyll Island. The monument consists of three 12-foot (3.7 m) steel sails and several historical storyboards. On November 25, 2008, a dedication of the memorial was held, attended by 500 participants, including descendants of slaves carried by Wanderer, and Erik Calonius, author of The Wanderer: The Last American Slave Ship and the Conspiracy that Set Its Sails (2008). He is credited with reviving interest in the story of Wanderer.

== See also ==
- USS Wanderer (1857) - more about the ship
- N. C. Trowbridge – American slave trader and Confederate agent (1815–1879)
- Daughters of the Dust, American film with a character who survived the Wanderer
