= Hamburg, South Carolina slave market =

Pre-1856 business cluster

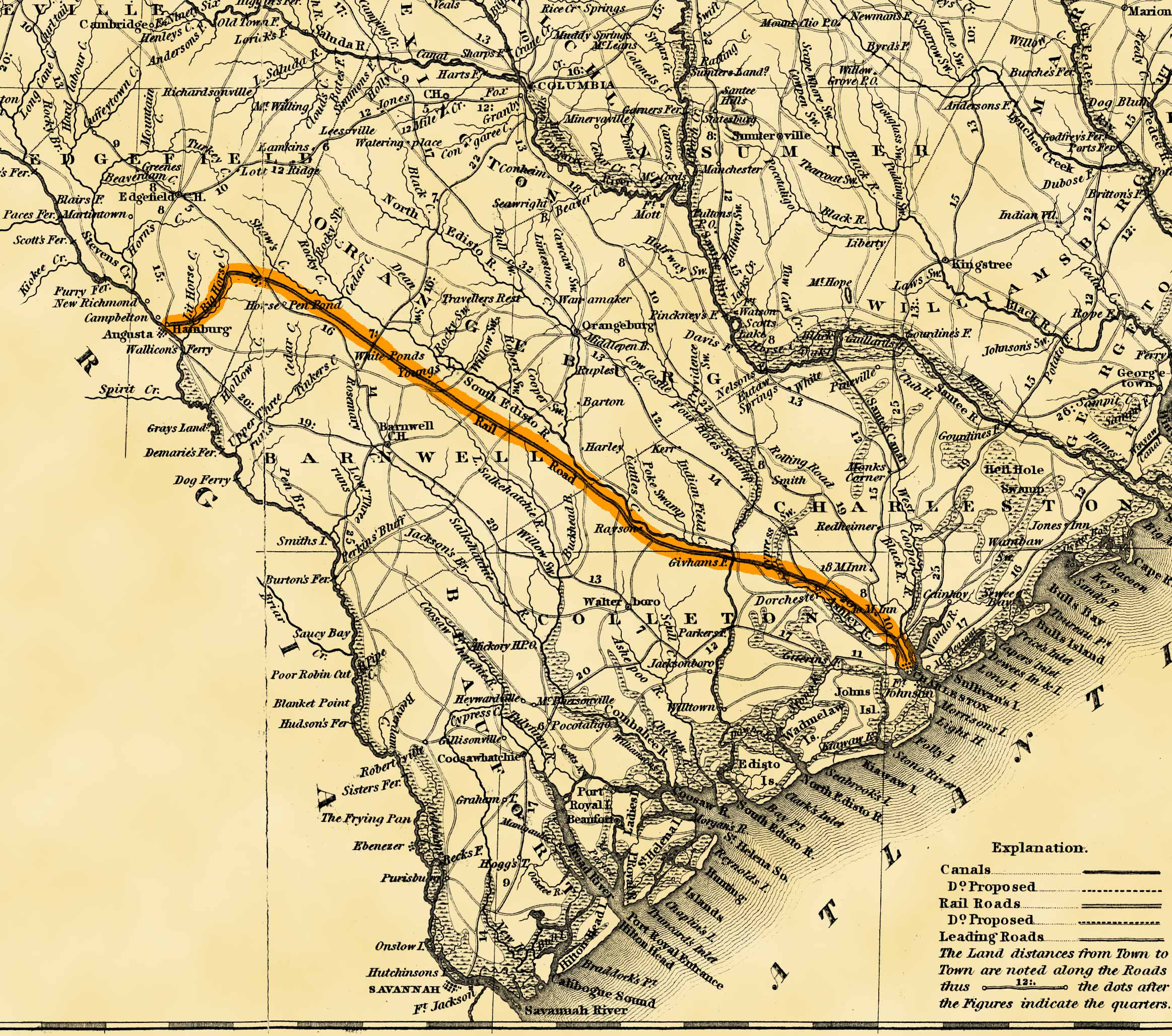
South Carolina Canal and Railroad Company route from Charleston to Hamburg c. 1833

Prior to 1856, there was a substantial cluster of slave-trading businesses in what is now the ghost town of Hamburg, South Carolina, which was located directly across the Savannah River from Augusta, Georgia. As of 1834, the road from Charleston to Hamburg was supposed to be the longest road in the United States. In 1842, there was a petition filed by residents of Hamburg in Edgefield District complaining "of various disorders including 'the practice of many evil disposed Negro traders to exhibit their Negroes for sale on the Lord's Day within the corporate limits of Hamburg, to the annoyance of the peace and good morals of the said town.'"

According to the Anti-Slavery Bugle in 1848, Hamburg was successful in part because it was a slave market located just outside Georgia, which had a state law banning interstate slave trading, "Hamburg, South Carolina was built up just opposite Augusta, for the purpose of furnishing slaves to the planters of Georgia. Augusta is the market to which the planters of Upper and Middle Georgia bring their cotton; and if they want to purchase negroes, they step over into Hamburg and do so. There are two large houses there, with piazzas in front to expose the 'chattels' to the public during the day, and yards in rear of them where they are penned up at night like sheep, so close that they can hardly breathe, with bull-dogs on the outside as sentinels. They sometimes have thousands here for sale, who in consequence of their number suffer most horribly." In the early years, traders who had come down the "upper route" pitched tents beside the bridge to await buyers. Resident Georgians could import at will from across the river so long as they retained ownership for at least a year past the initial purchase date. The Georgia law prohibiting the importation of slaves across state lines was repealed in 1856.

== Traders ==
The main trading cluster was likely on Center Street. Some of the slave traders working in Hamburg:

- Dr. James Alston
- Atkins & Spires
- T. Adkins
- T. B. Adkins
- Mr. Boyce
- Benjamin Davis
- W. C. Ferrell
- John C. Cureton
- W. Q. Gardener
- T. Goldsmith (agent)
- Houston
- Thomas J. Jennings & Co., also Jennings & Robertson
- John Lane
- R. M. Owings & Co.
- James Patterson
- Oliver Simpson
- Slatter brothers (Hope H. Slatter and Shadrack F. Slatter)
- W. Spires
- Spires & Wilson
- N. C. Trowbridge
- John Woolfolk

== See also ==
- Forks of the Road slave market
- Slave markets and slave jails in the United States
- List of American slave traders
- Bibliography of the slave trade in the United States
- David Drake (potter)

== Sources ==
- Tadman, Michael (September 2007). "The Reputation of the Slave Trader in Southern History and the Social Memory of the South". American Nineteenth Century History. 8 (3): 247–271. doi:10.1080/14664650701505117. ISSN 1466-4658.
