= John S. Montmollin =

American slave trader and banker (1808–1859)

John Samuel Montmollin II
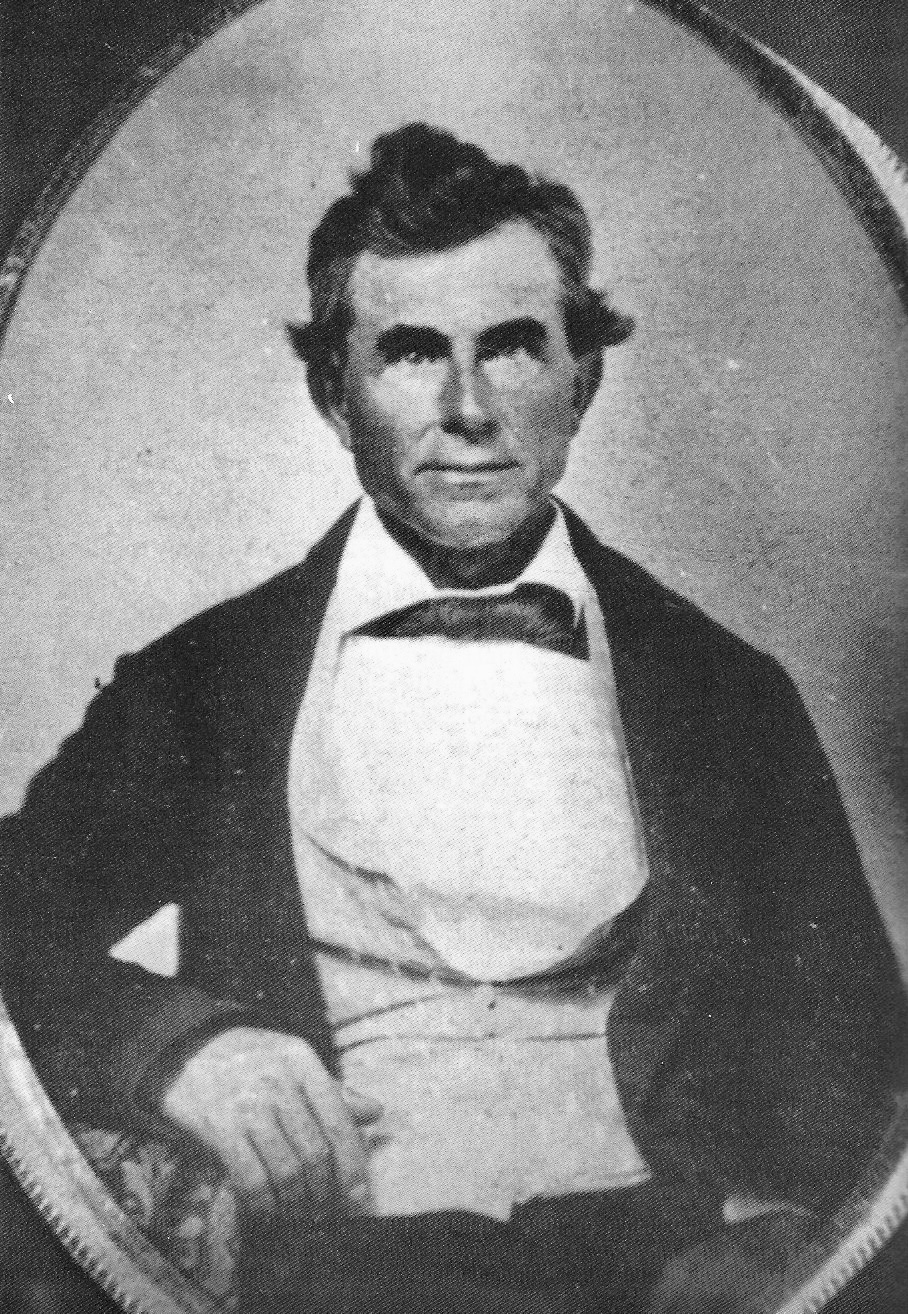
- Born: 1808; Savannah, Georgia, U.S.
- Died: June 9, 1859 (aged 51); Savannah River, Georgia, U.S.
- Cause of death: Boiler explosion
- Other names: de Montmollin, deMontmollin
- Occupations: Human trafficker, slave trader, banker

John Samuel de Montmollin II (1808 – June 9, 1859) of Savannah, Georgia, was an American slave trader, banker and plantation owner. According to descendants, Montmollin was heavily involved in the organization of the illegal slave transport Wanderer. Montmollin died in a steamboat boiler explosion on the Savannah River in 1859.

== Biography ==
Montmollin's maternal grandfather was Jonathan Edwards the younger, thus he was a first cousin, once removed, to Aaron Burr; as vice president, Burr stayed at the Montmollin home in 1802 while visiting Savannah. Montmollin married at Savannah, in 1842, Miss Harriet M. Rossignol. In 1848, he was a city marshal of Savannah, where he owned a plantation.

Montmollin was president of the Mechanics' Savings Bank of Savannah, which had been organized in 1854, and had capital amounting to US$250,000 (equivalent to $2,865,818 in 2025) in 1857. Beginning in 1856, he funded the US$11,500 (equivalent to $412,083 in 2025) construction of a still-extant three-story brick building now known as the John Montmollin Warehouse. The third floor was a slave pen (after the city was occupied by Union troops during the American Civil War the building was turned into a school for the city's African-American children, most of whom had never before had the opportunity to learn how to read or write). In December 1858 Montmollin sought to purchase "one or two gangs of rice field Negros." According to his daughter-in-law, who was interviewed in 1931, Montmollin sought to reopen the transatlantic slave trade and was responsible for organizing the illegal human trafficking transport Wanderer in 1858.

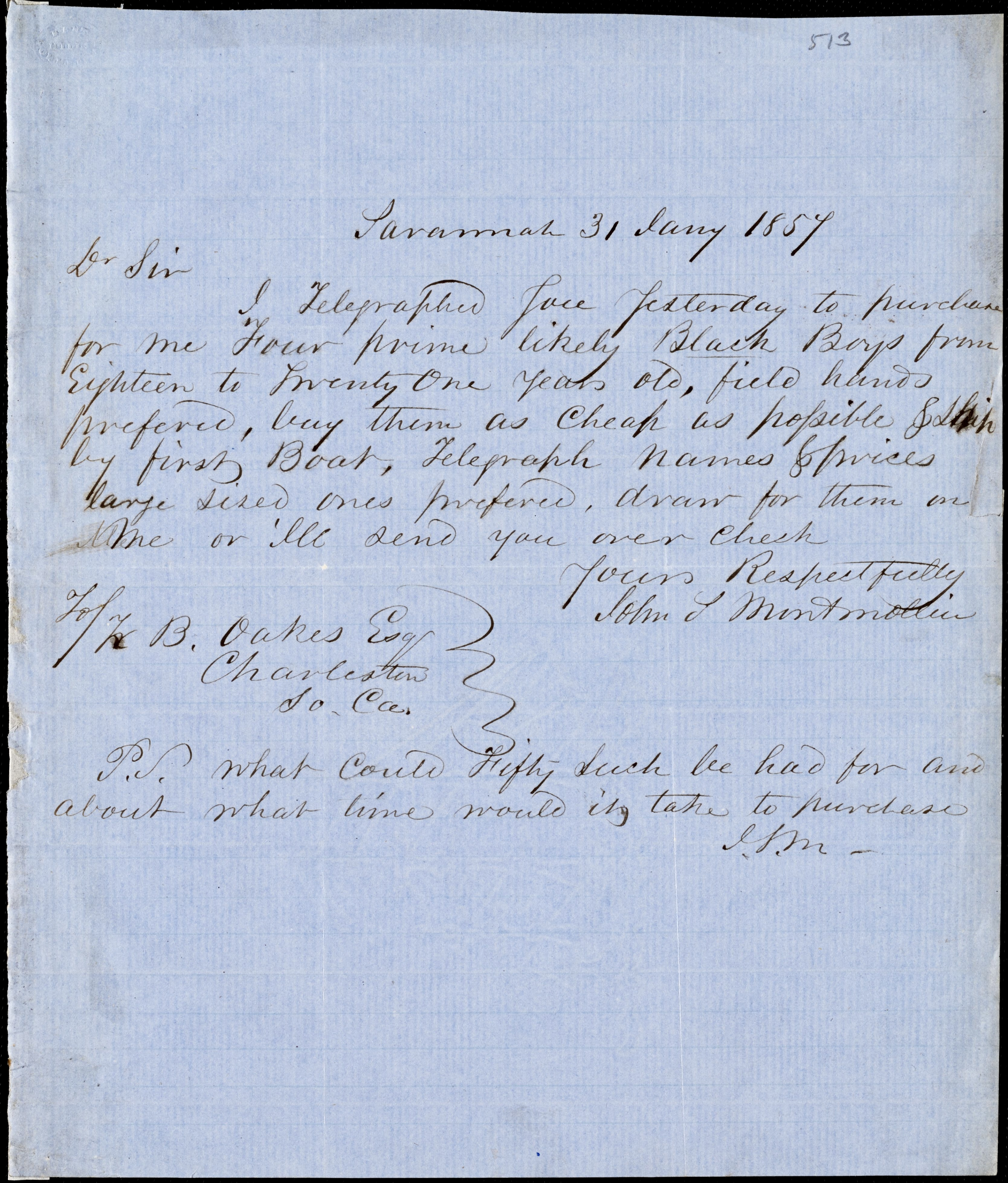
John S. Montmollin to Ziba B. Oakes, letter of January 31, 1857, requesting four Black Boys ages 18 to 21, large-size ones preferred, field hands preferred, "buy them as cheap as possible" (Boston Public Library Anti-Slavery Collection donated by James Redpath via William Lloyd Garrison)

John S. Montmollin was one of approximately eleven people killed when a boiler exploded on the Savannah River steamboat John G. Lawton on June 9, 1859. His body was found "imbedded in the marsh, head downwards, to the hips, some seventy to eighty yards from where the explosion occurred, showing it must have been driven very high into the air. A handkerchief, which he had in his hand at the time of the accident, was still tight in his grasp."

Montmollin was killed "within a short distance of the spot where his [Wanderer] captives had been incarcerated" on an island in the Savannah River.

Following Montmollin's death, his widow found that "her husband died owing debts of more than $30,000" and so in 1863 petitioned a court for permission to sell the estate slaves she had inherited. Permission was granted and she sold 81 slaves in Savannah in April 1863 for US$88,000 (equivalent to $2,301,081 in 2025).

== See also ==
- List of Georgia slave traders
- Timeline of Savannah, Georgia
- Georgia in the American Civil War
- Nelson C. Trowbridge, another slave trader involved with the Wanderer
