= E. A. Rawlins =

Suspected American pirate ship, 1850s

The E. A. Rawlins was an American barque of the 1850s that some suspected was used in the transatlantic slave trade, which by then had been illegal under the United States law for 50 years. However, rising slave prices had made this limitation controversial in some parts of the U.S. South, where there was a nascent movement to reopen the transatlantic slave trade. In August 1858, an American diplomat in Cuba wrote Secretary of State Lewis Cass that the E. A. Rawlins was likely to have landed 658 Africans, possibly taken from the Congo Basin region, at Puerta de la Teja, Cuba.

Rufus W. Clark in his 1860 tract The African Slave-Trade wrote:

The bark E. A. Rawlins was seized in the bay of St. Joseph, where she had taken upon herself the new name of Rosa Lee. Last December, she cleared from Savannah, with rice on board. At that time there were suspicions that she was a slaver, but she escaped. Two and a half months later, she was taken in St. Joseph's bay, an unfrequented place, westward of Apalachicola River. There was abundant evidence to believe that she had been to Africa, taken on board her living freight, subjected the victims to all the horrors of the 'middle passage,' and landed them at Cuba and on the coast of the Gulf of Mexico."

It was strongly suspected that Charles Lamar, who had been involved in illegal human trafficking in the Wanderer case, was running multiple ships of similar purpose and that some part (or all) of the human cargo of Lamar's ships had been intended for the "Cotton States" of America. Former governor of South Carolina D. C. Heyward, writing in the 1920s, argued that in addition to the Wanderer, Lamar had most likely imported slaves from Africa to the United States on the E. A. Rawlins and Richard Cobden.

== See also ==
- William Walker (filibuster) – American physician, lawyer, journalist, and mercenary (1824–1860)
- Act Prohibiting Importation of Slaves – US Congressional Act of 1807
