= Charleston Workhouse =

Jail and workhouse in South Carolina, U.S.

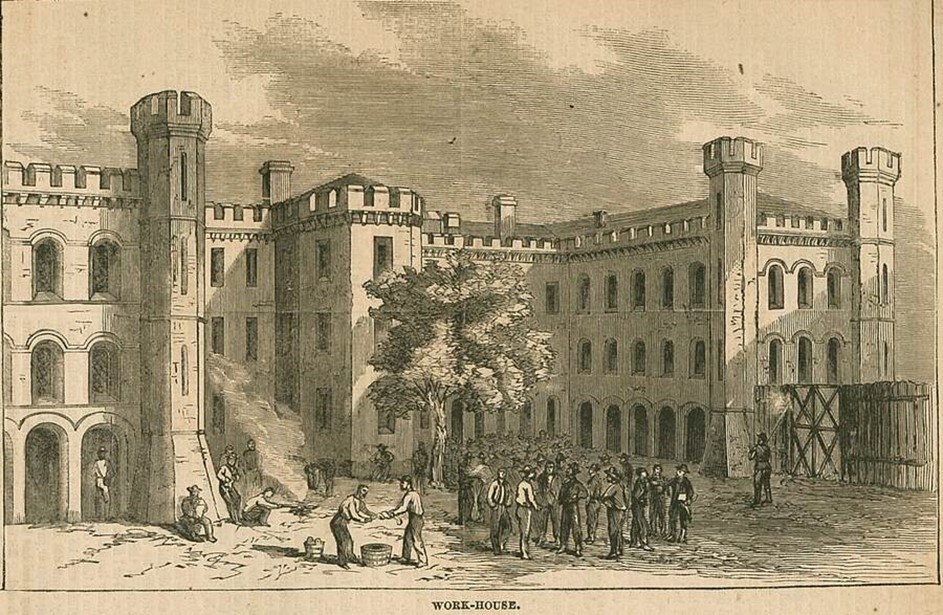
- Charleston Workhouse in Harper's Weekly (1865)
- Interactive map of Charleston Workhouse
- Location: Magazine Street & Logan Street, Charleston, South Carolina, United States; 32.7788°N 79.9362°W
- Status: Demolished
- Closed: 1886

The Charleston Workhouse was a facility in Charleston, South Carolina, used primarily for the imprisonment and punishment of enslaved individuals. Located on Magazine Street, adjacent to the Old Charleston Jail, the Workhouse operated as a site where enslavers could pay to have enslaved people confined and subjected to physical punishment. The facility was known for its harsh conditions, including floggings, confinement in stocks, and forced labor on a treadmill used for grinding corn. The Workhouse was damaged in the 1886 Charleston earthquake and was never rebuilt.

== History ==
The first workhouse in Charleston was established in 1736, modeled after English poorhouses. It was initially intended to house impoverished individuals but was soon repurposed to detain runaway enslaved individuals and those deemed "unruly" by their enslavers. The original facility, which also served as a public hospital, was located at the southwest corner of Magazine and Mazyck (now Logan) streets. By 1740, the City of Charleston passed a law that all captured runaways be held in the Workhouse until claimed or sold.

When a hospital for white paupers was built elsewhere in 1768, the sole purpose of the Workhouse became the punishment of enslaved individuals. After a fire in 1780, the British military, which occupied Charleston during the American Revolution, relocated the Workhouse to a former sugar refinery at the west end of Broad Street. After the occupation, the City of Charleston continued to use that facility for imprisonment and punishment of enslaved individuals before moving the Workhouse back to its original location in the late 1700's. By 1804, the Workhouse was permanently housed next door to the Charleston District Jail (now known as the Old Charleston Jail), which had been completed in 1802. In 1806 a new city ordinance restricted "corrections" to 20 lashes or fewer, limited to two per week or no more frequently than every three days. Also, any slave kept in the workhouse for more than nine months with fees unpaid was liable to be sold at auction. As of 1808, workhouse slaves were used for manufacturing pumps out of cypress and pine, and grinding corn into meal.

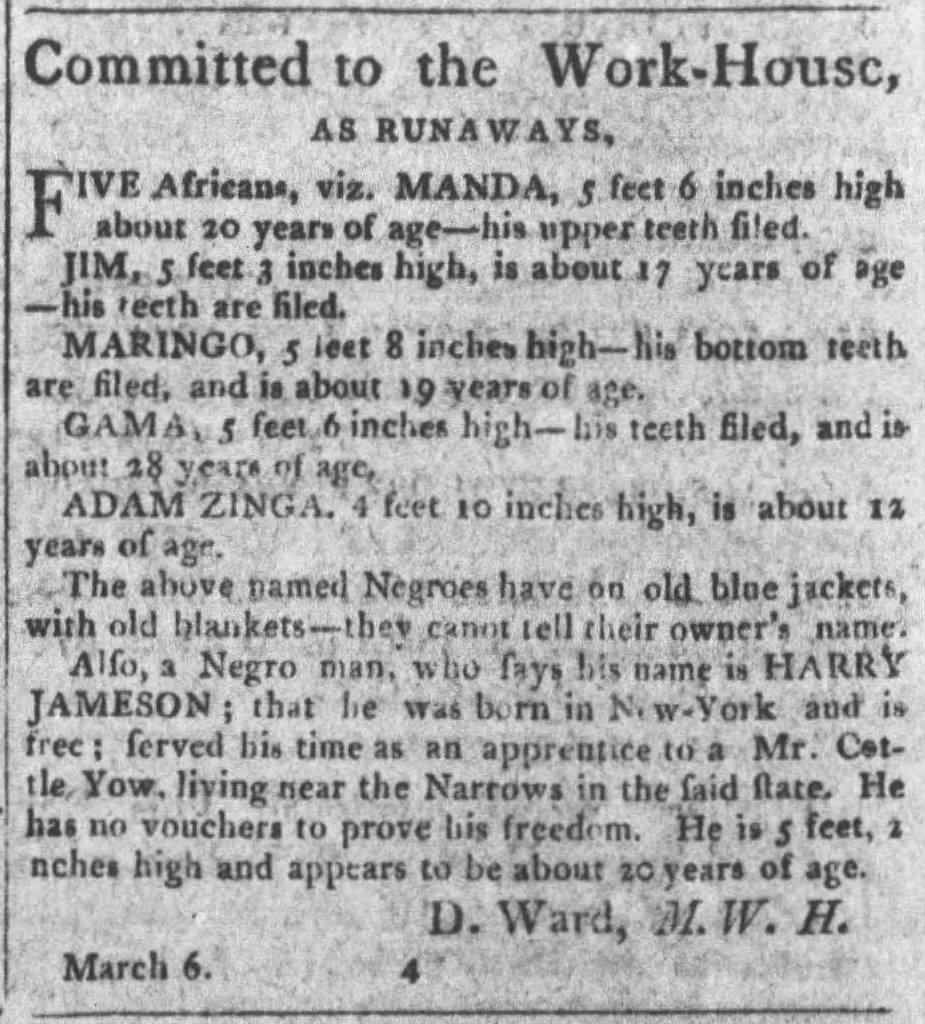
"Committed to the Work-House, as Runaways" Charleston Daily Courier, March 13, 1806

The workhouse was extensively described in a slave narrative published in The Emancipator in 1838. The informant said that the place was colloquially known as the Sugar House. This euphemistic or sarcastic name was because corporal punishment was believed to "sweeten" the temperament of people subjected to whippings.

I have heard a great deal said about hell, and wicked places, but I don't think there is any worse hell than that sugar house. It's as bad a place as can be. In getting to it you have to go through a gate, in a very high brick wall. On the top of the wall, both sides of the gate, there are sharp pointed iron bars sticking up, and all along the rest of the wall are broken glass bottles. These are to keep us from climbing over. After you get into the yard, you go through a gate into the entry, then through a door of wood and an iron door, chained and locked together, so as both to open at the same time. The lower story is built of stone of great thickness,—and above, brick. The building is ceiled inside with plank. Away down in the ground, under the house is a dungeon, very cold and so dark you can't tell the difference between day and night. There are six or seven long rooms, and six little cells above and six below. The room to do the whipping in is by itself. When you get in there, every way you look you can see paddles, and whips, and cowskins, and bluejays, and cat-o'-nine tails. The bluejay has two lashes, very heavy and full of knots. It is the worst thing to whip with of any thing they have. It makes a hole where it strikes, and when they have done it will be all bloody.

In the middle of the floor are two big sills, with rings in them, fastened to staples. There are ropes tied to the rings to bind your feet. Over the sills is a windlass, with a rope coming down to fasten your hands to. This rope leads off to the corner of the room, and there are pegs there to tie it to, after they have got you stretched.

Slaves are carried there to be whipped by the people in the country four or five miles round, and by all the people in the city, and the guard men carry there all the runaways they take up. Some would want their niggers whipped with the cowskin and paddled on top of that, and some with the paddle alone, because the paddle blisters and peels the skin all up. They wet the paddle, and then rub it in sand, and every time they hit with it, the skin peels off just the same as you peel a potato. When it gets well it will be right smooth, and not in knots as when whipped with the cowskin. Some would want their niggers whipped with one thing and some with another, and some would'nt care how they were whipped, so they got it.

On July 13, 1849, the Charleston Workhouse Slave Rebellion took place when an enslaved man named Nicholas Kelly led an insurrection against the guards. Armed with improvised weapons, Kelly and his fellow rebels wounded several guards and successfully liberated 37 enslaved individuals. However, most escapees were quickly captured and re-incarcerated. Kelly and two others were tried and executed by hanging.

Henry Box Brown included an image of the workhouse in his 1850 Mirror of Slavery touring panorama, promising a depiction of the interior of the Charleston Workhouse "with Treadmill in full operation." The workhouse caught the attention of abolitionists again in 1857, when F. C. Adams described it for the New York Evening Post. Slave owners could board slaves there for 17¢ a day; the slaves would be fed a peck of corn-grits per week. Adams described the jail cells, a "punishment room," and offices for slave brokers.

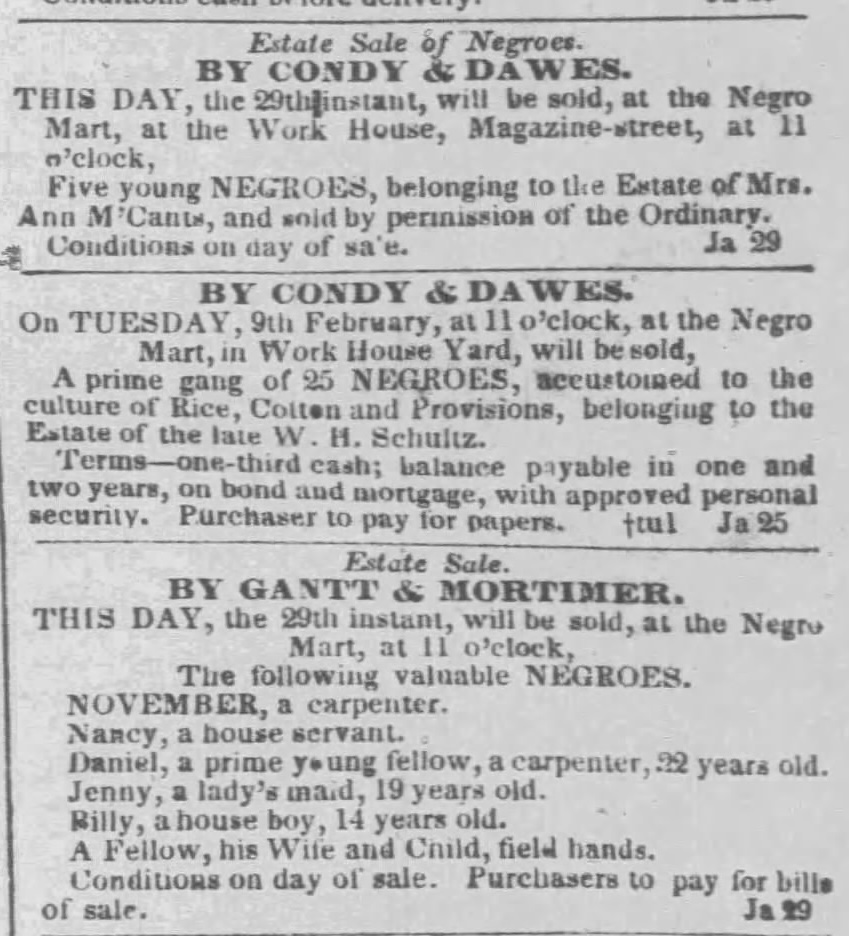
Three newspaper listings for estate sales to be held at the negro mart attached to the Charleston Workhouse yard (Charleston Daily Courier, January 29, 1841)

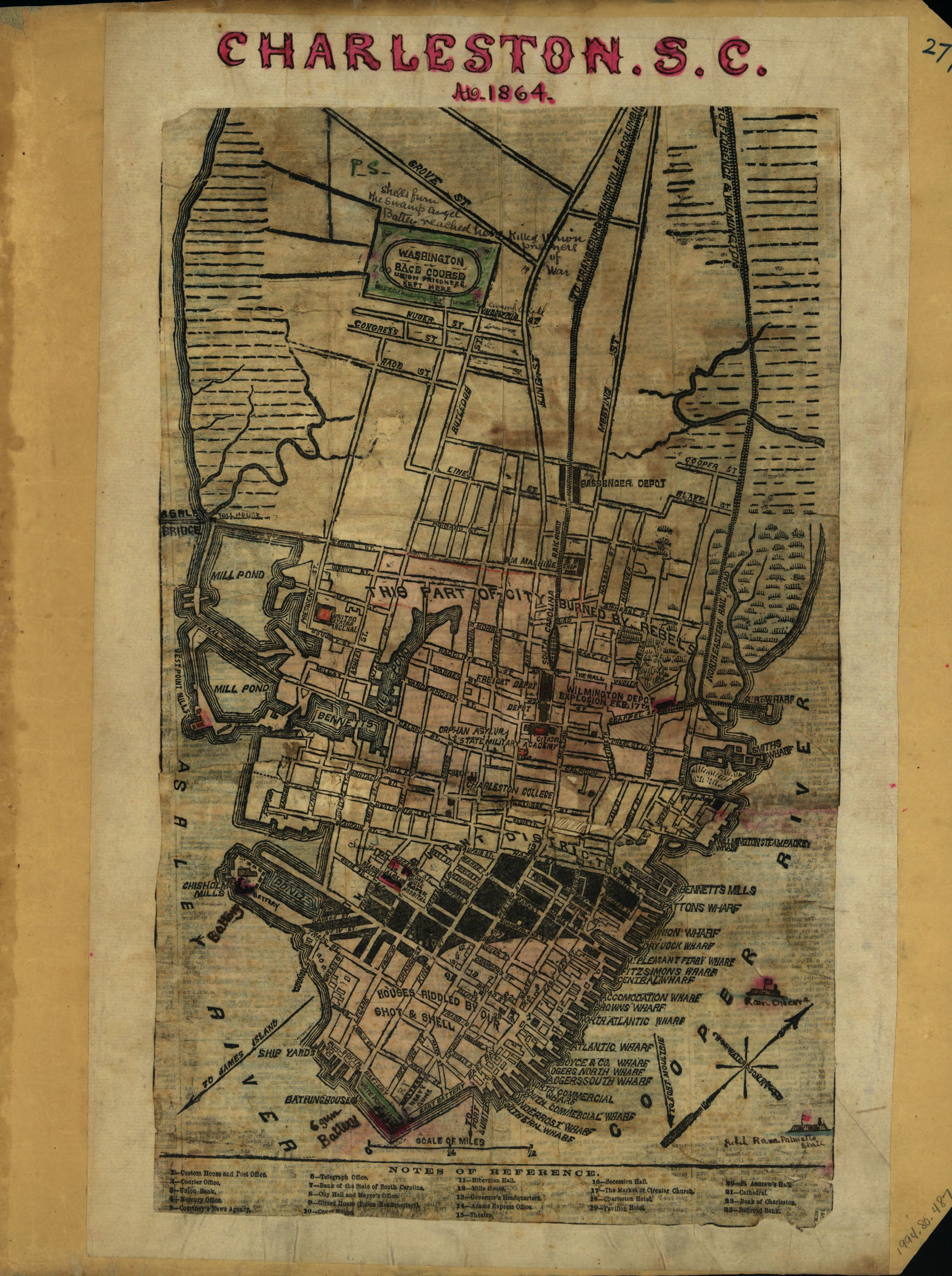
1864 map of Charleston showing workhouse and jail

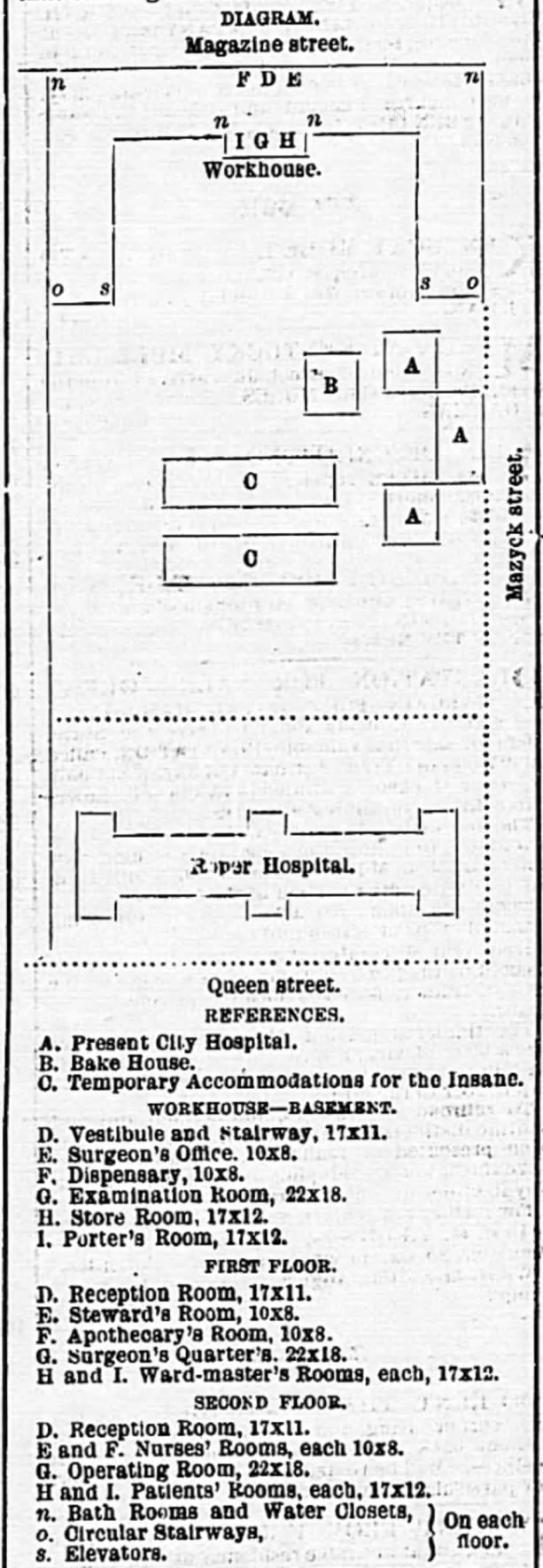
"The Hospital Problem" Charleston Daily News, August 9, 1872

== Operations and conditions ==
The Workhouse was known for its brutal treatment of enslaved individuals. Enslavers could pay a fee to have enslaved people whipped or otherwise punished. A standard flogging, consisting of up to 20 lashes, cost 25¢. Additional punishments included confinement in stocks and forced labor.

One of the most feared punishments was the treadmill, introduced in 1825. Originally designed for grinding corn, this machine was shaped like a large rotating stairway which up to 24 individuals would climb while their arms were pinned above their heads. Enslaved individuals would climb for three-minute intervals, followed by three minutes of rest, but these cycles could continue for up to eight hours per day. Many collapsed from exhaustion, suffered severe injuries, or died from the strain.

The Workhouse also served as a detention center for enslaved individuals awaiting sale. Enslaved individuals labeled as "runaways, vagrants, or disobedient" were confined in the facility, often before being returned to their enslavers or resold.

== Destruction and closure ==
On August 31, 1886, the Charleston earthquake caused extensive structural damage to the Workhouse. The building, which had been repurposed as a segregated hospital, partially collapsed, killing at least two patients. The damaged Workhouse was demolished and never rebuilt.

== Relationship to the Old Charleston Jail ==
The Charleston Workhouse is often mistakenly associated with the Old Charleston Jail due to the structures' close proximity and similar Gothic-revival architectural features. However, the two facilities were unrelated and served distinct purposes. The Jail housed criminals and other detainees, while the Workhouse was used for the punishment and control of enslaved individuals. Currently, the Old Charleston Jail is used as office space, an event venue, and a tour site.

== See also ==
- Old Slave Mart
- Exchange and Provost
- Hamburg, South Carolina slave market
- The Cage (Richmond, Virginia)
- Slave trade in the United States
- Slave markets and slave jails in the United States
- History of slavery in South Carolina
- Antebellum South Carolina
- Charleston in the American Civil War
