= History of slavery in South Carolina =

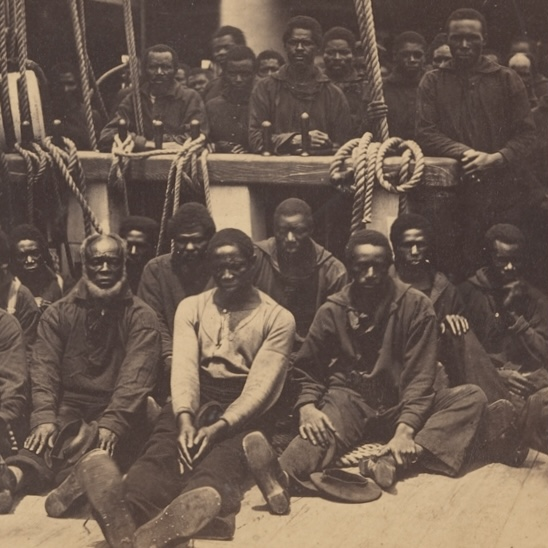
Detail of contrabands aboard USS Vermont (1848), Port Royal, South Carolina, photographed 1862 by Henry P. Moore (Metropolitan Museum of Art 2005.100.897)

Slavery in South Carolina was widespread and systemic even when compared to other slave states. From the Pickney cousins at the 1787 Constitutional Convention to the scores of slave traders active in Charleston for decade upon decade to the Rhett–Keitt axis of Fire-Eaters in the 1850s, South Carolina white men arguably did more (for longer) than any other single faction devoted to perpetuating slavery in the United States.

== Slavery in colonial South Carolina ==
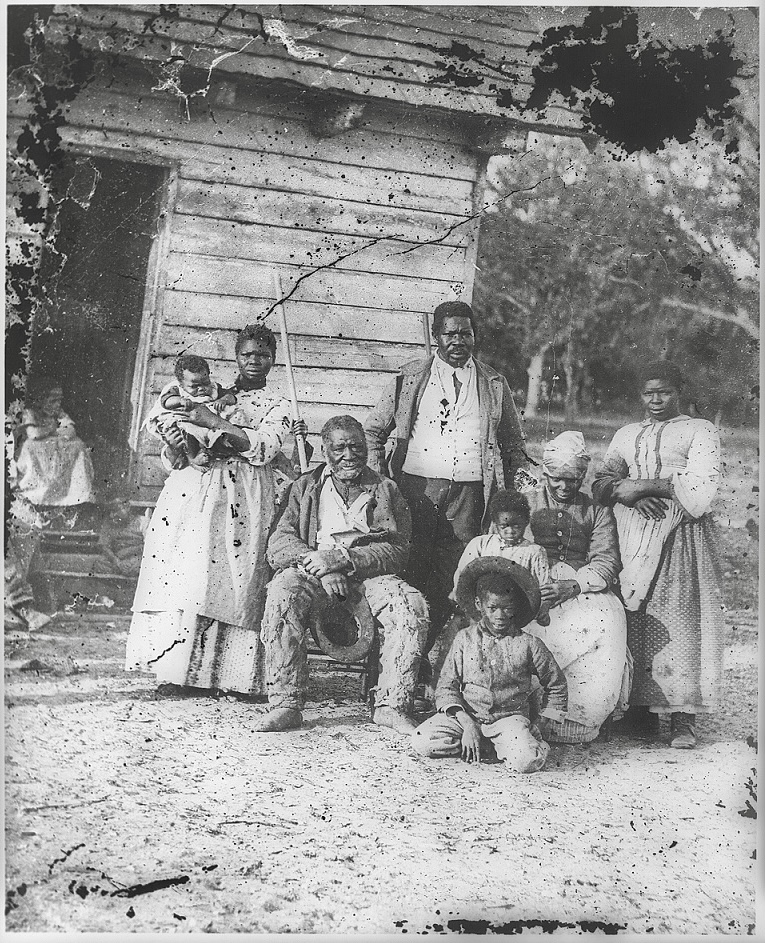
Family on Smith's Plantation, Beaufort, South Carolina, circa 1862. Image courtesy of the Library of Congress and learnnc.org.

The Fundamental Constitutions of 1669 stated that "Every freeman of Carolina, shall have absolute power and authority over his negro slave" and implied that enslaved people would supplement a largely "leet-men" replete workforce. Although African slavery was not mentioned in the “Declarations and Proposals to all that will Plant in Carolina” (1663), which distributed land using the headright system, the Lords Proprietors revised their stance motivated by their own financial stakes and to accommodate the wishes of the Barbadian settlers; these settlers, whom the Lords Proprietors sought to attract to the colony, expressed a desire to bring their enslaved African laborers with them. South Carolina's first governor, William Sayle, set a precedent by bringing four Black people in 1670. Similar to Virginia, numerous enslaved people in South Carolina were imported from the West Indies, with the majority from the British colony of Barbados; they were considered to have a certain level of immunity to prevalent diseases like malaria and yellow fever that were common in the region, and their proficiency in using native plants for medicinal purposes helped them adapt to the semitropical environment. During the early settlement in South Carolina, enslaved Africans imported from the West Indies could more easily live off the land thanks to their advantages over their European enslavers, such as their knowledge of tropical herbs, superior fishing skills, and their ability to navigate inland waterways via canoe or pirogue; during this early stage of settlement, African enslaved people worked alongside their enslavers by helping them build infrastructure such as housing. The Lords Proprietors charged the colonists with being disorderly, lazy, involved in piracy, and unlawfully enslaving the native people in the first thirty years of settlement. Reverend Gideon Johnston, the colony's commissary of the Society for the Propagation of the Gospel in Foreign Parts, called the English in Charles Town "the Vilest race of Men upon the Earth" and "the most factious and Seditious people in the whole World."

South Carolina was the only English colony in North America that favored African labor over White indentured servitude and Indigenous labor. South Carolina had the highest ratio of Black slaves to White colonists in English North America, with the Black population reaching sixty percent of the total population by 1715. Starting in 1708, the region maintained a Black majority throughout the 18th and 19th centuries until the mid-20th century, exacerbating colonists' fears about slave uprisings. Starting in the 18th century, South Carolina was referred to as 'like a Negro country.' Slave labor allowed South Carolina to become the wealthiest colony in the Americas by the mid-1760s.

== U.S. state ==
Delegates from South Carolina were among the most vigorous defenders of slavery at the 1787 Constitutional Convention and contemporary scholars describe them as "constantly exaggerating any threat to slavery combined with making persistent blustering threats to oppose the Constitution if they did not get their way on slavery-related issues." On the verge of the American Civil War, 45.8 percent of White households owned slaves. Under South Carolina law, enslaved people were "deemed, sold, taken, reputed and adjudged in law, to be chattels, personal in the hands of their owners and possessors, and their executors, administrators, and assigns, TO ALL INTENTS, CONSTRUCTIONS AND PURPOSES WHATSOEVER...A slave is not generally regarded as legally capable of being within the peace of the State. He is not a citizen, and is not in that character entitled to her protection."

== Enslaved African people's relationship with Indigenous people ==
Africans and Native Americans had basket-weaving traditions and the use of boats. Since both peoples shared similar outlooks on land, nature, and materialism, they were in close contact. Enslaved Africans learned native languages and local skills, so they were commonly used as translators and mediators of knowledge between Europeans and Native Americans.

== Task system ==
South Carolina Lowcountry differentiated itself by utilizing a task system; it allowed enslaved people time to work on their own projects after their assigned work had been completed, and they were also allowed to accumulate a small amount of property where "they planted corn, potatoes, tobacco, peanuts, sugar and water melons, and pumpkins and bottle pumpkins." This labor system contrasted with the "gang system" which was commonplace in most Anglo-American plantation societies; enslaved people worked in groups under the control of a leader and were forced to work the entire day, under this system. By the mid-18th century, one "task" unit was a quarter of an acre, and activities outside of cultivating rice were tasked, such as pounding rice grain and splitting up poles to provide fences. Partially due to the task system, enslaved people developed an internal marketing system in which the goods they produced or obtained in their spare time were sold or bartered with other enslaved people. Similar to Africa and the West Indies, the markets primarily consisted of women. Peaches, oysters, cake, cloth, etc. were sold in these markets, but they were not above being subjected to organized control prices. Enslavers allowed for these unofficial markets to exist; The enslavers who owned plantations believed their enslaved peoples' activities that took place outside of the task system to be of secondary importance to the plantation economy. Although many enslavers begrudged the relative independence and self-confidence boost that coincided as a direct result of these markets, all enslavers made compromises.

== Enslaved concubinage ==
Enslaved concubinage was a common practice that dates back to the creation of human bondage. Although in every colony where different races of people interacted, racial mixture occurred, English planters living on South Carolina islands commonly had a black mistress due to the black population outnumbering the white population. Throughout the South enslaved men sang "Massa Had a Yaller Gal", but the South Carolinian version "suggests the competition between enslaved and slaveholding men for the affections of these women." Some of the public were opposed to such relationships. When interracial sexual relations or reproduction occurred, it usually consisted of a white man and a Black enslaved woman. Even though White women were expected to remain faithful to their husbands and not have any sexual relations with Black men or Black slaves, wives were "the most disturbed and opposed to these relations. However, most wives' disdain for their husbands' interracial relations remained muted since some were afraid to confront their husbands about it, and bringing it up in public would risk losing their face within their households and their status in their communities. Historian Winthrop Jordan argued that prohibitions on interracial sexual relations between White women and Black men were the most strict. In regions where the Black population outnumbered the White population, Black concubinage was viewed as more acceptable compared to areas where there were fewer Black people.

== Rice and indigo plantations ==
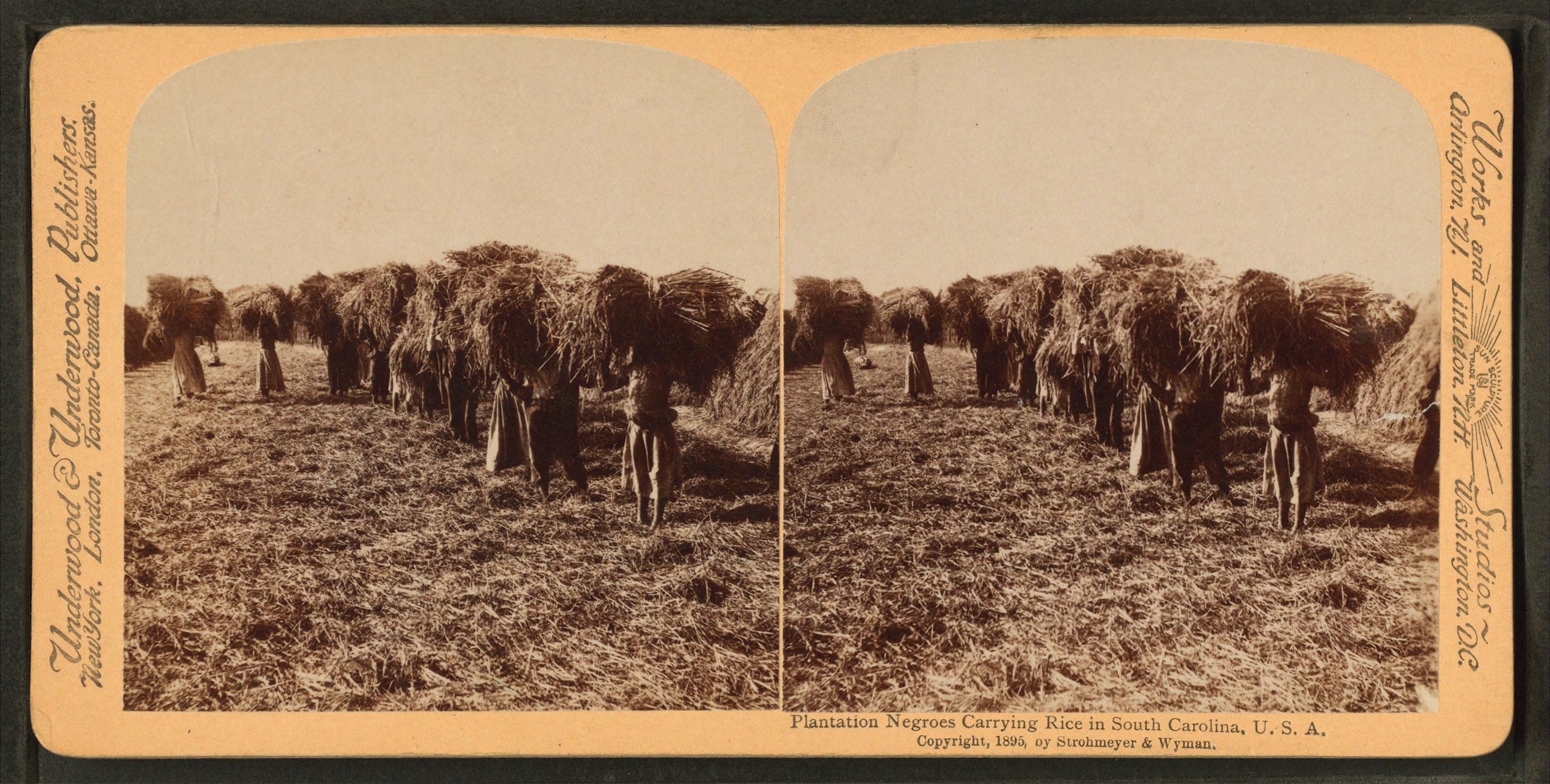
Enslaved people working on a plantation carrying rice in South Carolina

During the 1700s, French and British settlers built rice and indigo plantations that enslaved people worked on. Early in the century, rice became a South Carolinian staple, and by 1740, indigo became a profitable staple crop while remaining less popular than rice. Rice cultivation necessitated intense labor, so many British traders began importing thousands of enslaved people. These plantations were the state's economic backbone, specifically coastal rice estates, and they were seen as "the slow but sure way of getting rich" according to Alexander Garden. Many African enslaved people were already knowledgeable about the cultivation of rice. English rice plantation owners reaped the benefits of their enslaved people's rice-related agricultural knowledge, so they preferred to import enslaved people from Senegambia. Originally, rice was grown on dry upland soils, but by the eighteenth century, rice fields were built near rivers in low-lying regions. Even though this new system did not require as much weeding, enslaved people's workloads increased during construction, and they had to be maintained.

== Cotton plantation and production ==
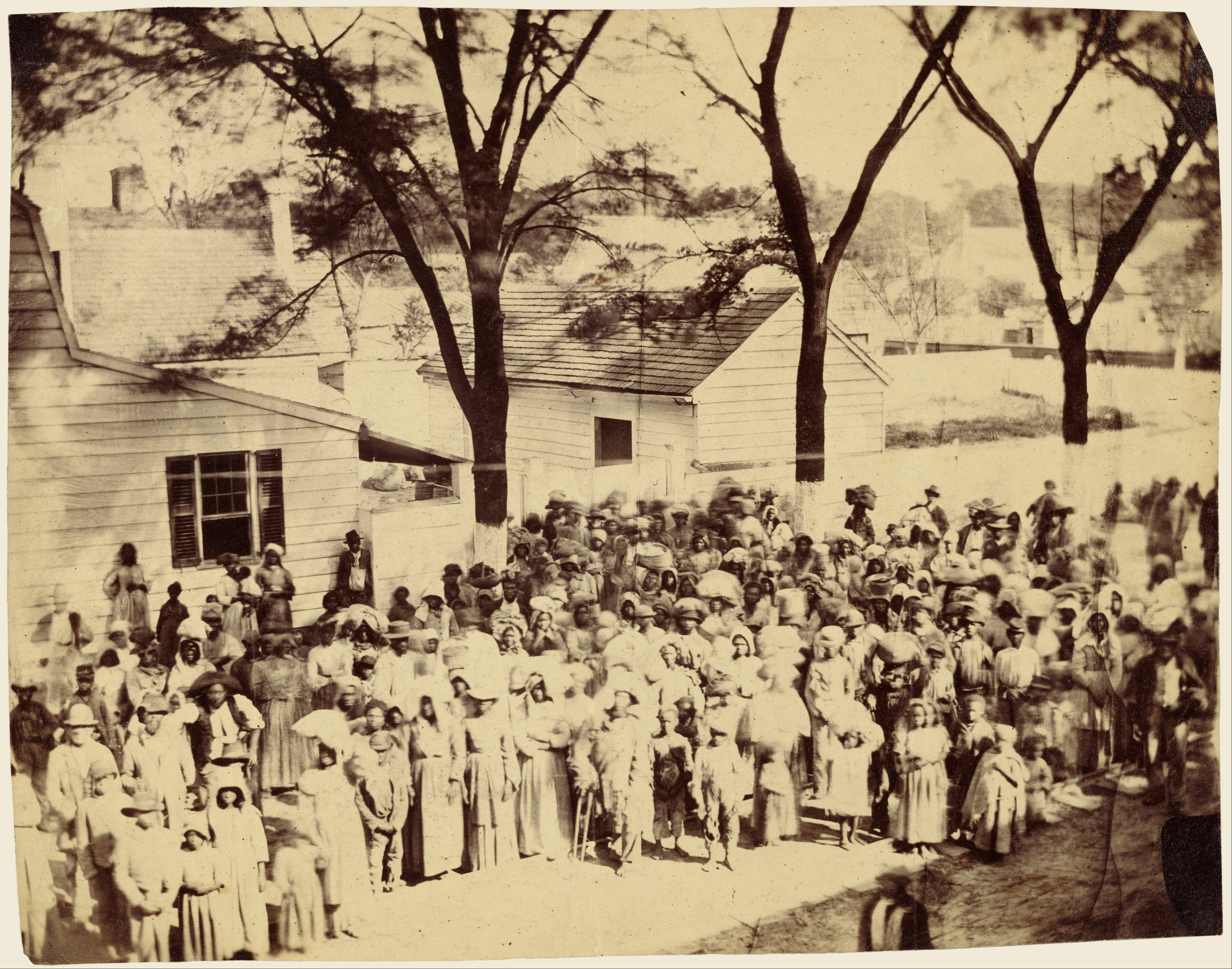
Enslaved people on South Carolina Plantation, 1862.

Originally, cotton was cultivated mainly for domestic use, primarily for Black enslaved people. There were many unsuccessful attempts at getting South Carolinian residents, who preferred trading for deer skins with the Native Americans, to produce cotton in the 17th century. Planters preferred growing more lucrative crops such as rice. Plantations were usually run entirely by enslaved people, and the plantation owners were accepting of this arrangement as it encouraged enslaved people to remain loyal, thereby preventing fleeing. In pre-revolutionary America, wealthy merchants and planters with spare time had the resources to "tinker" new agricultural crops such as cotton, and ultimately became more successful in expanding its cultivation compared to the Lords Proprietors. During the American Revolutionary Period, crops took priority on plantations while cotton cultivation and production were predominately for the use of local textile manufacturers.

== Transatlantic Slave Trade ==
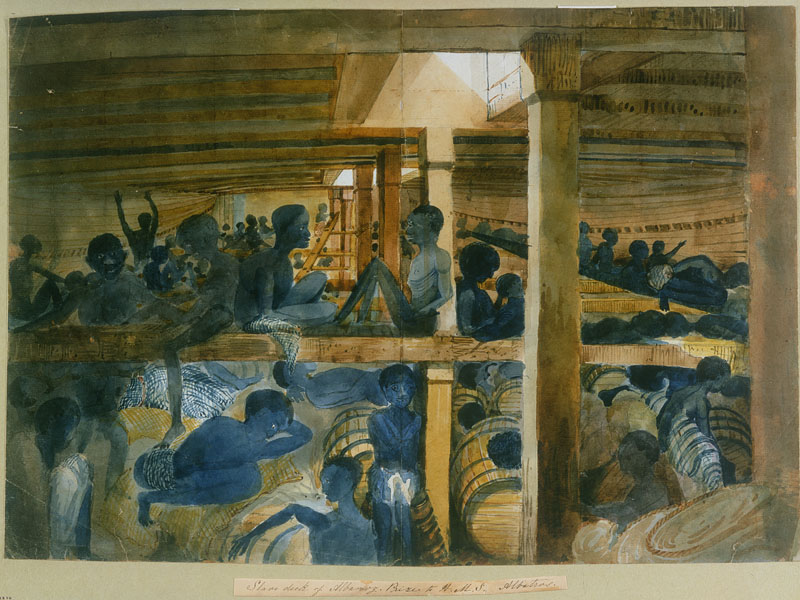
This image is from a sketchbook of watercolours depicting places visited by Francis Meynell while on a Royal Navy anti-slavery patrol off the west coast of Africa and includes several ship portraits. They were painted on board the Albanoz, a captured Spanish slave ship in 1846, so the people shown had in fact been liberated though not yet landed and released. They nevertheless provide a rare eyewitness view of conditions in the hold of a slave ship—imprisoned in a confined space.

In the seventeenth and early eighteenth centuries, Barbados served as a major port for England's trans-Atlantic slave trade. Charleston was a major hub of both the transatlantic and interstate slave trades. During the early eighteenth century, Charles Town (renamed to Charleston in 1783) started to receive large numbers of enslaved people directly from Africa. By 1710, African arrivals to Charles Town were typically fewer than 300 annually; by 1720, there were more than 1,000 annual arrivals, and by 1770, over 3,000. The South Carolina General Assembly reopened the port of Charleston to the transatlantic slave trade between 1803 and 1807, during which time some 50,000 enslaved Africans were imported to the state; this trade was finally cut off by the 1808 federal law Prohibiting Importation of Slaves. Thus, the phrase "African by birth" appears roughly five times more frequently in South Carolina newspapers (1776–1865) than it appears in the newspapers of any other state.

== Domestic slave trade ==
Historian Frederic Bancroft found that there were no fewer than 50 slave traders, called "brokers" in Charlestonian parlance, working in the city in 1859–60.

== Maroon communities ==
Maroon communities were settlements located in swamps, forests, and mountains, consisting of runaway enslaved people. The community members intentionally chose these terrains due to their inaccessibility, as white colonists were less likely to find and re-enslave the runaways. Most of the runaway enslaved people voluntarily returned to their enslavers because they succumbed to hunger and cold or were captured. However, some possessed the skill and determination to establish autonomous communities in the wilderness and "had no intention of returning to slavery." The majority of evidence of the existence of maroon communities has been found in South Carolina; this is due partially to the fact that the state's population consisted mainly of enslaved people, many of whom had memories of freedom, meaning that their enslaved population was less assimilated compared to anywhere else in North America. The South Carolina Legislature distinguished between escapees who had been absent for three months or less and "notorious runaway slaves who shall be run-away 12 months." White colonists were legally permitted to kill "notorious runaway slaves" if the colonists were incapable of re-capturing them. Low-country South Carolina's geography encouraged the creation of these communities since "back swamps" interlocked with tidal rivers such as the Cooper, Santee, Ashley, Edisto, Savannah, etc. Even though "back swamps" and rice swamps both consisted of low and marshy ground, "back swamps" were overgrown, densely forested, were inhabited by alligators and rattlesnakes, and had poor drainage, rendering them unsuitable for rice cultivation.

== Resistance and revolts ==
Notable slave uprisings in South Carolina history included the Stono Rebellion (1739), the Denmark Vesey Conspiracy (1822), and the Charleston Workhouse Slave Rebellion (1849). While few whites died at the hands of enslaved people, the revolts led to more restrictive policing of slavery.

London newspaper adverts from the 1700s show that enslaved people from South Carolina were brought to Britain where many elected to free themselves by running away. On the night of the 8th of December 1702 an enslaved young woman, about 16 years of age, named Bess (Elizabeth) left the residence of Captain Benjamin Quelch. After she had been absent for more that three days, Captain Quelch placed an advert in the newspaper.

"A Negro Maid, aged about 16 Years, much pitted with the Small-Pox, speaks English well, having a piece of her left Ear bit off by a Dog: She hath on a strip’d Stuff Wastcoat and Petticoat, absented herself from her Master Capt. Benjamin Quelch, on Tuesday the eight instant at Night, If any one brings her to Mr. Lloyd’s Coffee-House in Lombard-street, they shall have a Guinea Reward and reasonable Charges."

He placed a second advert in January 1703, indicating Bess had still not returned more than a month later.

Captain Quelch and his wife Elizabeth and Bess, appear to have arrived in London from Jamaica on board the ship Betty, of which he was part owner, on the 6th November 1702, just weeks before Bess absconed.

The Betty was a slave ship, making its return journey after delivering enslaved Africans from an unknown location to Port Royal, Jamaica. But the Quelches were based in South Carolina. Elizabeth Quelch (nee Dearsley) was the sister of George Dearsley, a well known land owner in South Carolina from whom she received a significant inheritance a few years later consisting of a house, grounds and 10 enslaved Africans, as well as a part share in the ship Mayflower and Hobclaw shipyard.

Elizabeth must have known Bess well to trust her to care for her on the long voyage to an unfamiliar place, especially as she was in the last stages of pregnancy at the time. Benjamin and Elizabeth Quelch baptised their son, George, in St Andrew's Church Enfield on the 19th November 1702 and sadly buried him on the 21st. Bess left just a few weeks later. The fact that she was still nowhere to be found when the second advert was placed on the 2nd of January 1703, indicates that her bid for freedom was successful. The Quelches would go on to have another son, also called George, baptised in Enfield almost a year to the day later and would return home at some point prior to 1709, when Elizabeth inherited her brother's estate.

== Gallery ==
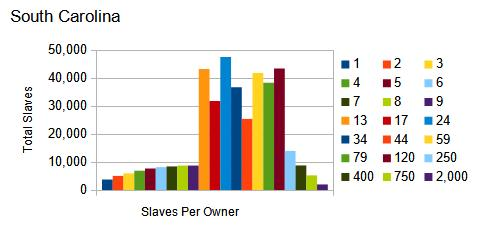
1860 US census, South Carolina, number of slaves per owner

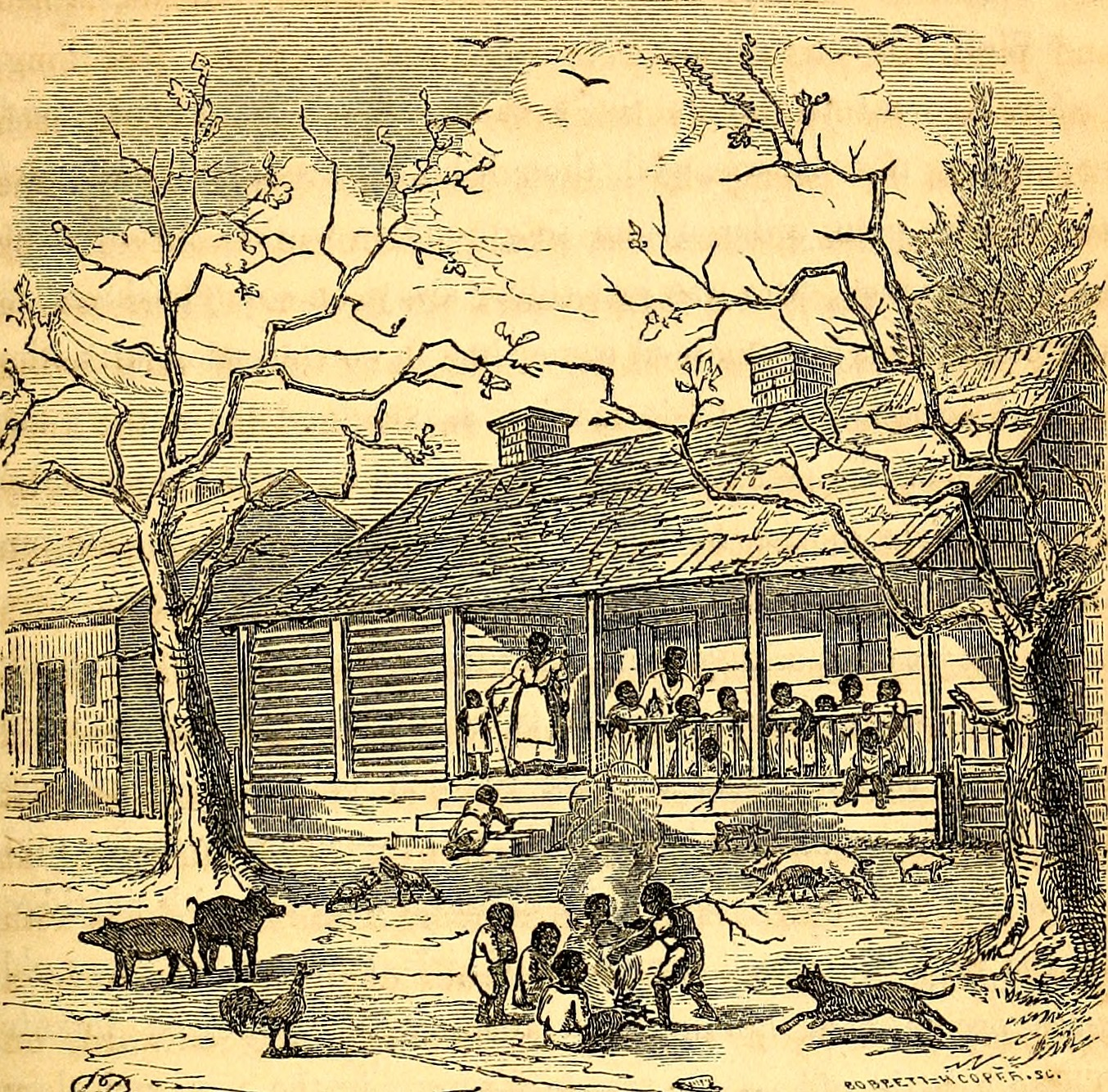
Illustration from Frederick Law Olmsted's A journey in the seaboard slave states - with remarks on their economy (1856)

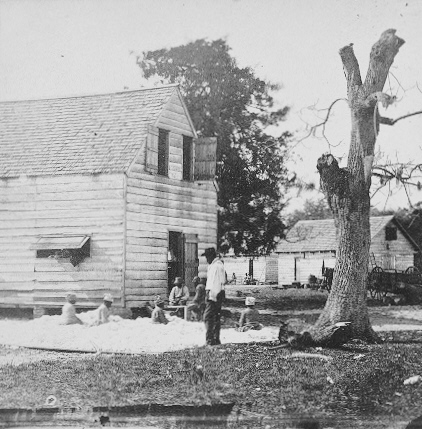
African Americans outside a building preparing cotton for the cotton gin, possibly at Smith's plantation, Port Royal

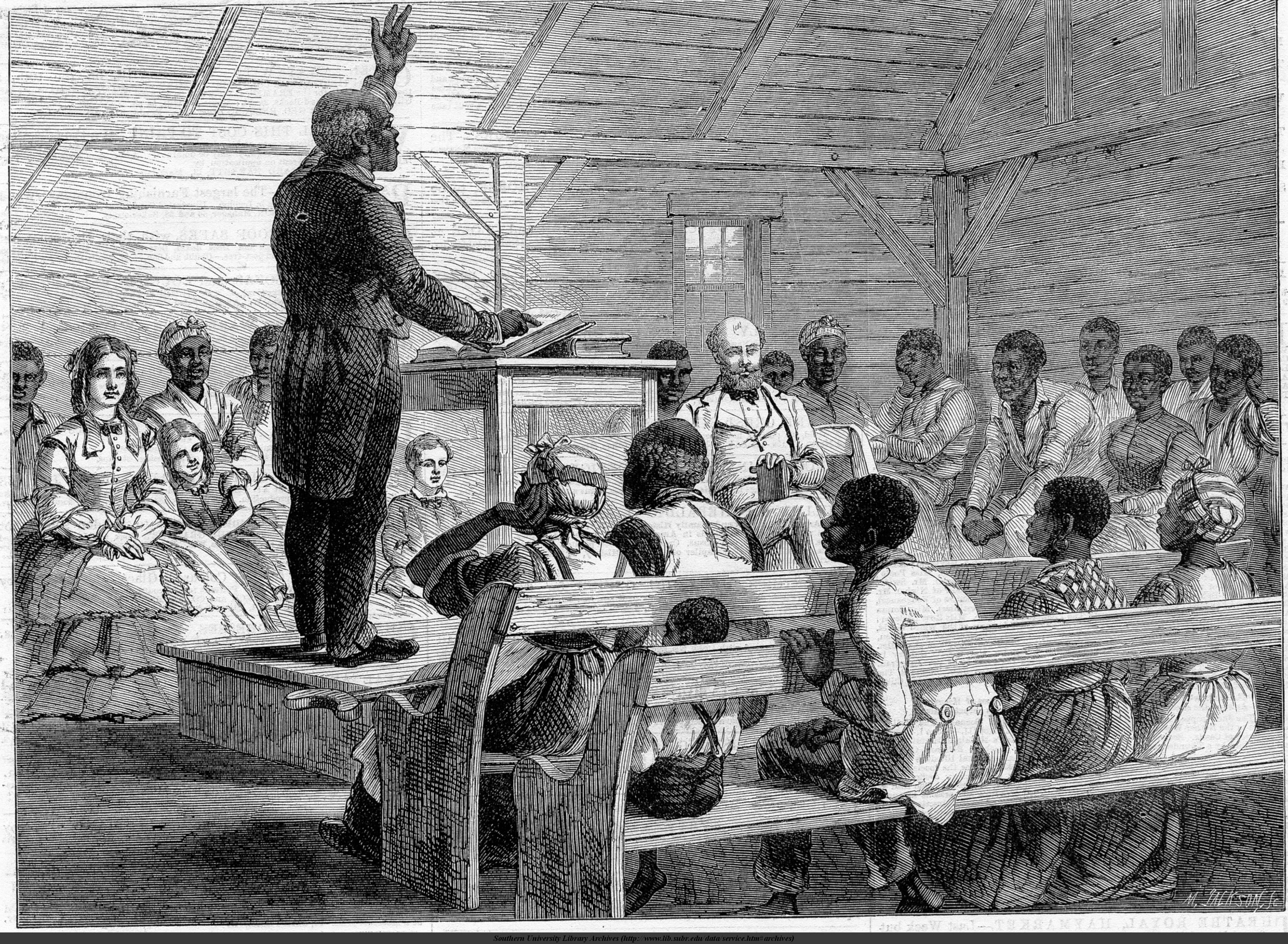
Plantation slave chapel worship, South Carolina, 1863

== See also ==
- Antebellum South Carolina
- History of slavery in the United States by state
- Indian slave trade between Barbados and South Carolina
- List of plantations in South Carolina
- Old Slave Mart
- Port Royal Experiment
- South Carolina slave codes
