= John M. Gilchrist =

American slave trader (fl. 1830–1860)

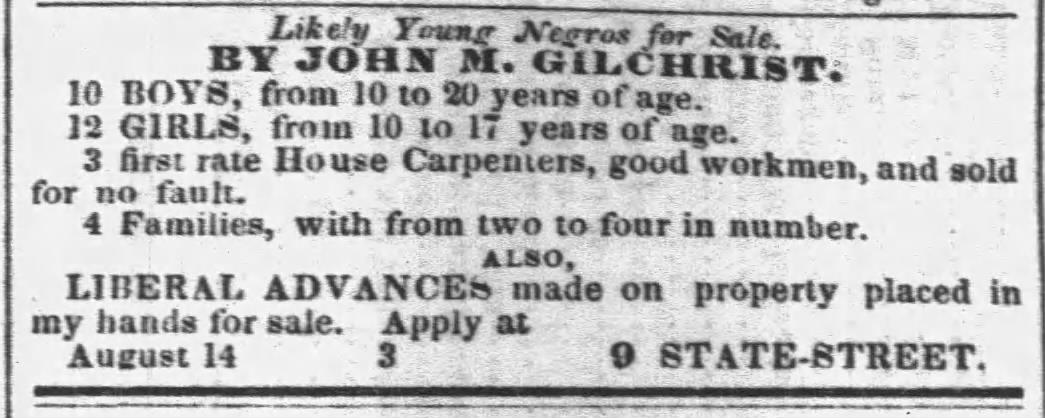
- "Likely Young Negroes for Sale" by J. M. Gilchrist, including 10 boys, 12 girls, three house carpenters, and four families (Charleston Daily Courier, August 17, 1858)

John M. Gilchrist (born c. 1810) was a 19th-century slave trader of Charleston, South Carolina, United States. Gilchrist seems to have been engaged in interstate trading to some extent, primarily to Alabama, Georgia, and Louisiana. Gilchrist was also seemingly bolder than many slave traders in openly advertising individual children for sale, separate from their families of origin, potentially setting himself up for abolitionist opprobrium. Gilchrist's trading was a primary trigger for the 1849 Charleston Workhouse Slave Rebellion. There is little record of Gilchrist's life outside of his work as a trader.

== Life and work ==
Gilchrist was born around 1810 in South Carolina. Gilchrist may have been trading as early as 1830, when he would have been about 20 years old, as he placed a newspaper ad in 1840 asserting that he had "for the last ten year had an extensive and large business in trading transactions generally viz: Selling and negociating [sic] sales of Slaves, Real Estate, Bonds and Mortgages and all kinds of negotiable Paper, the sale of Cotton or any other article..." Gilchrist was certainly in the slave business by 1838, when he placed a "Negroes Wanted" classified ad in a Camden, South Carolina newspaper. Gilchrist traveled frequently between Camden and Charleston, and between Georgetown, South Carolina and Charleston. (When traveling between Georgetown and Charleston, he took the same steamer as Savannah slave trader and banker John S. Montmollin on at least one occasion.) The record of an 1839 South Carolina court case with ties to Alabama mentions Gilchrist as party to an agreement to "speculate on negroes" with several business partners.

Records of coastwise slave ships arriving in Savannah, Georgia and New Orleans, Louisiana offer some evidence of Gilchrist's business. In 1841 John M. Gilchrist sent three enslaved people to New Orleans. Also in 1841 he shipped enslaved people to Savannah from Charleston on the William Seabrook; and in the first quarter of 1844 he shipped people on the Charleston. Meanwhile, he continued dealing locally as well. For example, in 1844, he offered 113 people "for private sale" in Charleston. In 1843, a letter from N. S. to The Liberator newspaper of Boston, a publication that essentially served as a special-interest newsletter for anti-slavery people in the United States, reported that straw-stuffed effigies of enslaved people, including one bearing a sign that read "For sale—$350—no brokerage!", were hanged on lampposts outside the offices of Charleston slave traders Thomas Gadsen, John M. Gilchrist, and a Ryan (possibly Thomas Ryan or J. S. Ryan). The letter writer said it was thought to be the work of "northern fanatics" and that former Governor George McDuffie, now in the U.S. Senate, would want to see the culprits hanged.

In spring of 1846, William H. Smith petitioned a Charleston court "that he sold eleven slaves to John M. Gilchrist, a slave trader, in 1845 for the sum of $2,400. The terms of the sale were cash. Some time after the sale, Gilchrist alleged that he had been informed that a third person claimed title to the slaves. He therefore refused to pay for the purchase or to return the slaves. Smith fears that Gilchrist has already 'eloigned & carried off' some of the slaves and that his intent in making the allegation is fraudulent. He therefore prays for an order compelling Gilchrist to answer the premises of his suit. He asks that Gilchrist be directed to deliver the slaves and account for their wages or pay the purchase money. He also seeks an injunction to prevent Gilchrist from 'removing eloigning or in any way putting away'" John, Lewis, Lucy, Mary Jane, Nancy, Sally, Sarah, Washington, or William without the express permission of the court. Smith's petition was granted pro confesso. He was in a second court proceeding, against J. Edwards, the same year.

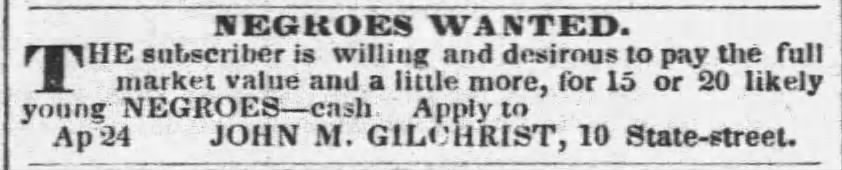
"Negroes Wanted" (Charleston Daily Courier, August 1, 1849)

Gilchrist was the precipitating factor in the Charleston Workhouse Slave Rebellion of 1849 when he came to take away a female slave who was under the protection of Nicholas Kelley; Kelley and Gilchrist scrapped, with Gilchrist ultimately turning tail, while Kelley instigated a revolt and mass escape by the prisoners of the workhouse. As historian Jeff Strickland put it in his 2021 book All for Liberty, "Gilchrist had torn hundreds of slave families apart, and, on this day, he threatened to do it again. Gilchrist ignored Nicholas and ordered his slave, named Scotland, to take her, but Nicholas and a few other slaves beat Scotland badly to keep him away from her. Then Nicholas went after Gilchrist, but the slave trader ran inside the workhouse for refuge." The rebellion was suppressed, Kelley was hanged, no one living knows what became of the woman, and Gilchrist went back to the job the abolitionists called soul driver.

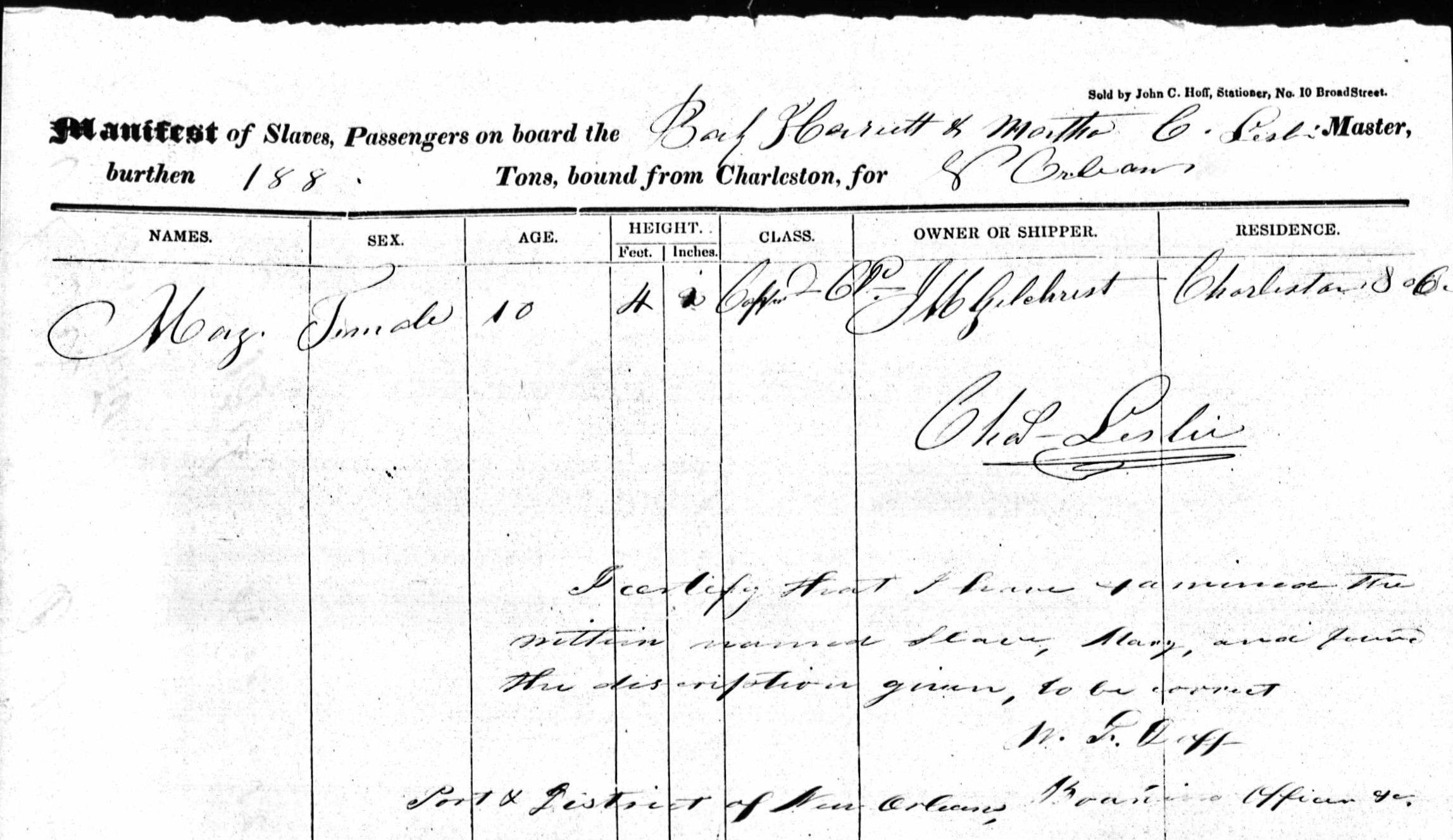
Gilchrist put an unaccompanied 10-year-old named May on a barque bound for New Orleans

As of the 1850s, Gilchrist was part of a partnership under the title Gilchrist & King, which seemed "primarily, to have been involved in buying from South Corolina slave-holders and in directly reselling in the Lower South". Gilchrist & King listed a group of 80 plantation-trained workers for sale in March 1850, along with "eight single BOYS and GIRLS, age 14 to 17". The partnership of Gilchrist & King was dissolved in May 1852. The King in question may have been a man named Jesse King, who lived in Milledgeville, Georgia in 1854, and wrote Charleston trader Ziba B. Oakes asking about slave prices and asking "If Mr. J. M. Gilchrist is [in] Charleston, please see him and ask him if he has received no letter from me lately and if he has why he don't answer it." In 1854 Gilchrist wrote Oakes telling him to pay the bearer of the letter, one Eli Cohen, $3.75 for digging the privy as agreed.

Gilchrist continued to sell people south from South Carolina throughout the 1850s. In 1853 he shipped enslaved people to the port of Savannah via the Metamora and the Gordon; and in 1858 he again used the Gordon for shipping enslaved people from South Carolina to Georgia. There are also two Charleston city death records from the 1850s listing enslaved people who died while legally owned by Gilchrist, who are thus listed in the death registers under given name dash J. M. Gilchrist. Scipio was 24 years old when he died February 5, 1852, of gastritis. Jenny was about 45 years old when she died on June 30, 1853.

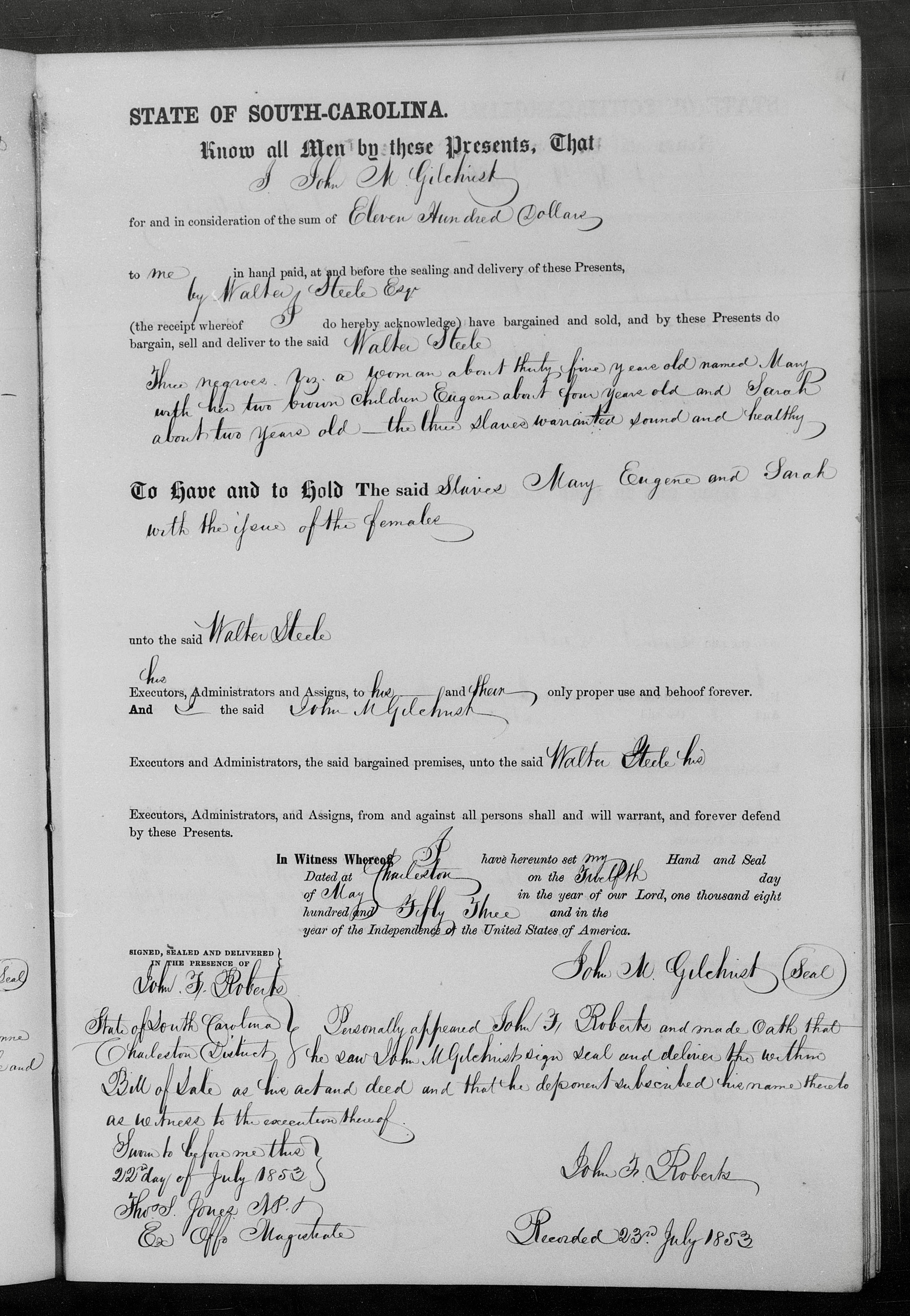
A typical 1853 slave trade in Charleston: Gilchrist sold Mary and "her two brown children" four-year-old Eugene, and two-year-old Sarah, "with the increase of the females," to Walter Steele for $1100

Gilchrist was actively trading slaves until 1859, demonstrating sustained commitment to the commerce in people. In 1859, Gilchrist listed his occupation as "broker and commercial merchant" working out of 11 State St. in Charleston. At the time of the 1860 census, Gilchrist's occupation was listed as "broker," which was the euphemism for slave traders that was preferred in Charleston. Gilchrist shared a household with a 35-year-old mulatto pastry cook named Margaret Richardson. Gilchrist's circumstances after 1860 are unknown.

== See also ==
- List of American slave traders
- History of slavery in South Carolina
- Slave markets and slave jails in the United States
- Bibliography of the slave trade in the United States
- Family separation in American slavery
