= Charleston Police Department =

Official police force of Charleston, South Carolina

Coordinates: 32°47′20″N 79°57′34″W

- Patch of the Charleston Police Department

- Flag of the City of Charleston
- Common name: Charleston Police Department
- Abbreviation: CPD
- Motto: H.E.A.R.T. (Honor, Excellence, Accountability, Respect and Teamwork)

Agency overview
- Formed: 1856; 1865; 1877 (modern department)
- Employees: 573
- Annual budget: $60,782,338 USD (2023)

Jurisdictional structure
- Operations jurisdiction: Charleston, South Carolina, United States
- Area: 142 sq mi (367.78 km^{2})
- Population: 159,138 (2023)
- Legal jurisdiction: Municipal
- General nature: Local civilian police

Operational structure
- Headquarters: 180 Lockwood Boulevard, Charleston, SC 29402
- Sworn members: 456
- Unsworn members: 117
- Chief of Police responsible: Chito Walker
- Agency executives: Jack Weiss, Deputy Chief of Investigations; Dustin Thompson, Deputy Chief of Operations; Vacant (formerly Chito Walker), Deputy Chief of Procedural Justice and Community Policing
- Departmental Teams: 10: Patrol Team 1 (N of Calhoun); Patrol Team 2 (S of Calhoun); Patrol Team 3 (James/Johns); Patrol Team 4 West Ashley; Patrol Team 5 Daniel Island; Team 6 (Schools); Team 7 (Traffic); Team 8 (Investigations); Team 9 (Central Business District); Team 12 (Community Outreach)
- Bureaus: 3: Bureau of Operations; Bureau of Investigations; Bureau of Procedural Justice and Community Policing

Facilities
- Cars: 400
- Police boats: 5
- Horses: 2
- K-9 units: 8

Website
- Official website

The Charleston Police Department (CPD) is the primary law enforcement agency within Charleston, South Carolina, United States. Established in 1855, it is one of South Carolina's largest and oldest municipal agencies. It has 456 sworn officers, 117 civilian employees, and several reserve police officers.

== History ==
In the early colonial period, police protection for the citizens of Charleston was performed by the Town Watch, a paramilitary unit. After incorporation in 1783, Charleston formally established the City Guard, another paramilitary force. The City Guard helped suppress the 1822 Vesey slave rebellion. From 1846 to 1855, the City Guard was reorganized several times and finally emerged in 1856 as a uniformed police force under the administration of Mayor William Porcher Miles.

The guard was armed with swords and pistols. It enforced a nine o'clock curfew for African-American residents of the city. Based at the Guard House at the corner of Broad and Meeting Streets, the force flogged those out after hours.

Before the close of the Civil War, martial law was enacted in Charleston, and the city police force disbanded. Civil police forces were revived and reorganized in 1865, following the election of P.C. Gaillard. These forces served as a counterpoint to the federal authorities until the end of martial law in 1877.

The election of Mayor W.W. Sale that same year marked the introduction of a city police organizational system of officers and men, divided between the main station and the upper station, a system that was continued by succeeding administrations.

By 1880, the police force had "one hundred men, including a chief, three to five lieutenants, six to ten sergeants, three to four detectives, and seventy-three to eighty-five privates". On 7 February 1888, a new station was opened at the corner of southeast King and Hutson streets.

In 1895, state authorities established a metropolitan police and seized control of the organization from January 1896 to 30 September 1897, at which time control was returned to the city. In 1907, a large, modern facility was erected at the northwest corner of Vanderhorst and St. Philip streets. The police department remained at this location until 1974, when they moved to their current location on Lockwood Boulevard.

In July 2011, the department was re-accredited through 2014 with the Accreditation with Excellence Award by the Commission on Accreditation for Law Enforcement Agencies (CALEA). Replacing the former Flagship Award, the Accreditation with Excellence Award is the highest single-period accreditation award available. The department also received the Meritorious Accreditation Award in 2011, representing at least 15 continuous years of CALEA accreditation.

The CPD was criticized for its response to the 2020 George Floyd protests in downtown Charleston, which some called insufficient.

== Organization and structure ==
The City of Charleston Police Department is organized and overseen by the chief of police, who is appointed by the mayor. The mayor is responsible for overseeing the police department and transmitting orders and directives from the city council.

=== Operational areas ===
The Charleston Police Department is divided into four operational areas, which are under the command of the three main deputy chiefs (except in the case of the Chief of Police Staff). These areas are the Chief of Police Staff, the Bureau of Operations, the Bureau of Investigations, and the Bureau of Procedural Justice, and Community Policing.

Operational area	Commanding officer	Description	Subdivisions
Chief of Police Staff	Chief of Police	The Chiefs Staff is directly under the command of the chief of police. It is responsible for the administrative functions of the Charleston Police Department.	This area can be further subdivided into Legal, Administrative Assistant, and the CPAC Liaison.
Bureau of Operations	Deputy Chief of Operations	The Bureau of Operations accounts for the largest bureau in the CPD, as it is primarily responsible for patrol. This bureau is under the command of the deputy chief of operations.	This area can be further subdivided into Patrol and Special Operations.
Bureau of Investigations	Deputy Chief of Investigations	The Bureau of Investigations is responsible for the prevention, detection, and investigation of Crime. It is under the command of the deputy chief of investigations.	This area can be further subdivided into the Central Investigations Division and the Forensic Services Division.
Bureau of Procedural Justice and Community Policing	Deputy Chief of Procedural Justice and Community Policing	The Bureau of Procedural Justice and Community Policing is responsible for Internal Investigations, administrative duties, and for community outreach.	This area can be further subdivided into the Professional Standards Division, Administrative Services Division, Community Oriented Policing Division, Fleet Operations, Procedural Justice & Research, and Special Projects.

== Headquarters building ==
The first policing organization in Charleston was the Town Watch. The watch had two main headquarters buildings, the first located above the Half Moon Battery (today the site of the Exchange and Provost). The second building was located on Broad Street between "the Public Armory, State House, St Michael's, and the Market". In 1838, the City decided that the City Guard (which evolved from the Town Watch after the city was incorporated) needed a new guard house. The new building was larger, and was used until August 1886, when it was irreparably damaged in an earthquake. The site of the new guard house is where the post office and courthouse would later stand.

1887 saw the birth of the Charleston Police Department as it is known today, as well as the construction of a central police station to replace the guard house. The station was located at the corner of King and Hutson streets, a lot which was "long vacant, neglected, and most unsightly". The station was located next to South Carolina State Arsenal. In February 1906, the Citadel Military Academy wanted to expand, and asked the city to sell the building to the state, an agreement that was finalized in 1908.

In 1907 a new headquarters building was opened at the northwest corner of Vanderhorst and St. Philip streets. This would be the headquarters building until 1968, when plans were begun to move the department yet again. In 1974 these plans were finalized and the department moved to their current location on Lockwood Boulevard.

== Fallen officers ==
The Charleston Police Department has lost 24 officers in the line of duty since 1857. The CPD has the most fallen officers of any local city department in the State of South Carolina.

== Services ==
The Charleston Police Department has a broad array of specialized services, including SWAT, K-9 Unit, Explosive Devices Team, Mounted, Civil Disturbance Team, Underwater Response, and Harbor Patrol.

In 2022 the city responded to 124,337 calls for service, which resulted in 4,451 arrests and two vehicle pursuits.

In 2024 the city responded to 112,791 calls for service, resulting in 5,535 arrests.

Reported crimes
Crime	2024	2023	2022	2021
Aggravated assault	328	340	316	336
Homicide	6	10	9	16
Robbery	68	82	72	88
Sex offense	36	36	57	65
Burglary/breaking & entering	211	263	245	273
Motor vehicle theft	340	447	494	468
Theft from motor vehicle	785	786	731	771
Total	1,774	1,964	1,924	2,017

== Demographics ==
By gender

- Male: 83%
- Female: 17%

By race (sworn officers)

- 69.00% White
- 14.00% Black
- 4.00% other
- 1.00% Asian

By race (unsworn employees)

- 8.00% White
- 3.00% Black
- 1.00% other
- 0.00% Asian

== See also ==
- Charleston church shooting
