= Old Slave Mart =

- U.S. National Register of Historic Places
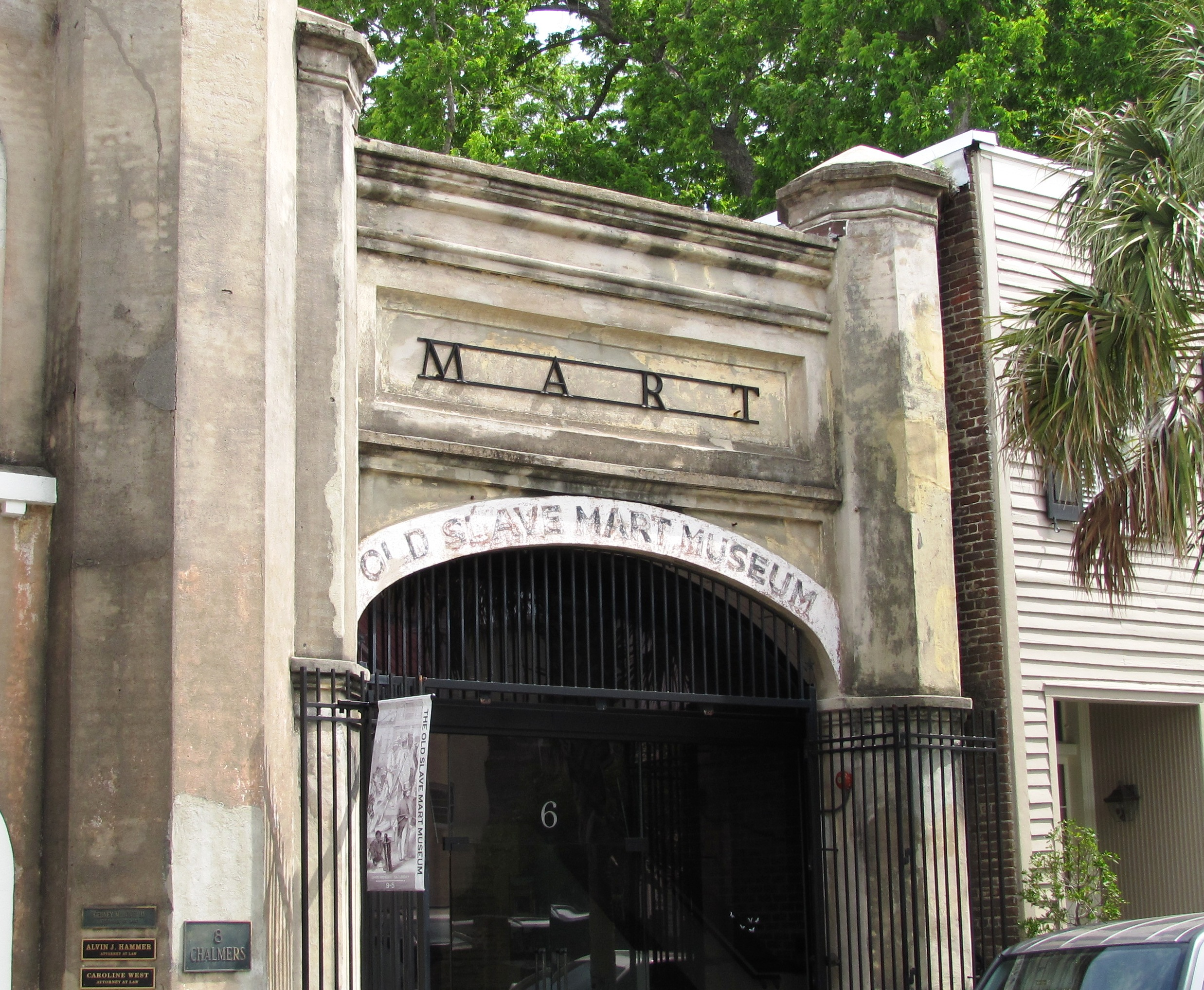
- Old Slave Mart facade
- Location: 6 Chalmers Street, Charleston, South Carolina
- Coordinates: 32.7778°N 79.9284°W
- Area: less than one acre
- Built: 1830s
- Architectural style: Gothic Revival, Romanesque
- NRHP reference No.: 75001694
- Added to NRHP: May 2, 1975

The Old Slave Mart is a building located at 6 Chalmers Street in Charleston, South Carolina that once housed an antebellum-period slave-auction gallery. Constructed in 1859, the building is believed to be the last extant slave auction facility in South Carolina. In 1975, the Old Slave Mart was added to the National Register of Historic Places for its role in Charleston's African American history. Today, the building houses the Old Slave Mart Museum.

The Old Slave Mart was originally part of a slave market known as Ryan's Slave Mart, which covered a large enclosed lot between Chalmers and Queen Streets. Charleston City Councilman Thomas Ryan established the private auction facility in 1856 after a citywide ban on public slave auctions. Slave auctions were held at the site until approximately 1863; in 1865, the Union Army occupied Charleston and closed Ryan's Mart. The Old Slave Mart Museum has operated on and off since 1938.

== Design ==
The Old Slave Mart is a 67-foot (20 m) by 19-foot (5.8 m) brick structure with a stuccoed façade. The front (south side) faces the cobblestone-paved Chalmers Street. The building originally measured 44 feet (13 m) by 20 feet (6.1 m), but an extension in 1922 gave it its current dimensions. The unique façade of the Old Slave Mart consists of 20-foot (6.1 m) octagonal pillars at each end, with a central elliptical arch comprising the entrance.

The building initially contained one large room with a 20-foot (6.1 m) ceiling. In 1878, a second floor was added, and the roof was overhauled. The arched entryway initially held an iron gate; in the late 1870s, it was filled with simple doors. Interior partitions were added in subsequent decades, dividing the first floor into three rooms. Today, an iron gate is in the archway again.

== History ==
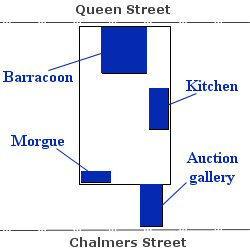
The layout of Ryan's Mart, circa 1860.

Throughout the first half of the 19th century, enslaved people brought into Charleston were sold at public auctions held on the north side of the Exchange and Provost building. After the city prohibited public slave auctions in 1856, Charlestonians established enclosed slave markets along Chalmers, State, and Queen streets. One such market was Ryan's Mart, established by city councilman and broker Thomas Ryan and his business partner James Marsh. Ryan's Mart originally consisted of a closed lot with three structures — a four-story barracoon or slave jail, a kitchen, and a morgue or "dead house."

In 1859, an auction master named Z. B. Oakes purchased Ryan's Mart and built the Old Slave Mart building as an auction gallery. The building's auction table was 3 feet (0.91 m) high and 10 feet (3.0 m) long and stood just inside the arched doorway. In addition to enslaved people, the market sold real estate and stock. Slave auctions at Ryan's Mart were advertised in broadsheets throughout the 1850s, some appearing as far away as Galveston, Texas.

When U.S. Army forces occupied Charleston beginning in February 1865, the people Ryan's Mart still enslaved were freed.

In 1878, the Old Slave Mart was converted into a tenement dwelling, with a second floor added. A car dealership and showroom operated in the building in the 1920s, which expanded the rear of the building.

== Transition into a museum ==
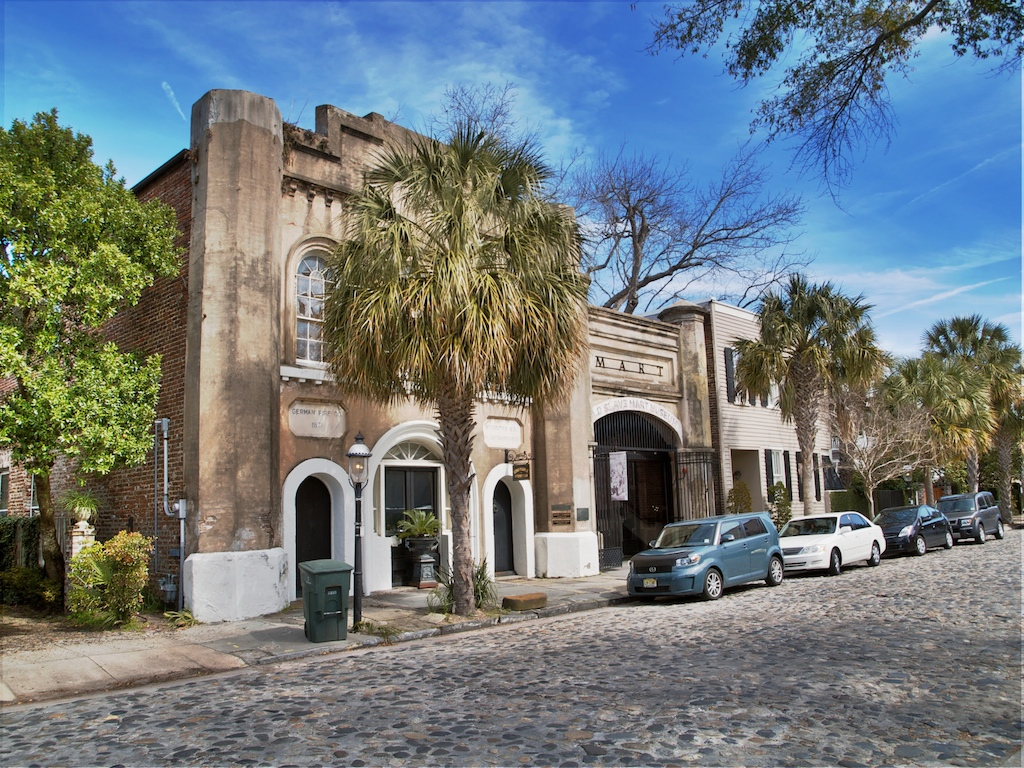
Museum Front of the "Old Slave Mart."

In 1938, Miriam B. Wilson purchased the building and established the Old Slave Mart Museum, which initially displayed African and African-American art. Wilson operated the museum on a shoestring budget until she died in 1959. Although Wilson was from Ohio, the Old Slave Mart Museum, under her ownership, embraced local beliefs that slavery had been good for African Americans. Wilson bequeathed the museum and its artifacts (mostly crafts made by enslaved African Americans) to the Charleston Museum, which declined to take them. Wilson also sold Colonial Belle Goodies and attempted to attract a broader audience to the museum.

The museum closed in 1987 due to budgeting issues. The City of Charleston and the South Carolina African American Heritage Commission restored the Old Slave Mart in the late 1990s. The museum now interprets the history of the city's slave trade. The area behind the building, which once contained the barracoon and kitchen, is now a parking lot.

In a 2018 auction, the College of Charleston purchased 47 boxes of documents from the museum's early years for $5,400 (~$6,624 in 2024).

== See also ==
- Old Charleston Jail
- Charleston Workhouse
- Exchange and Provost
- Antebellum South Carolina
- Slave trade in the United States
- Slave markets and slave jails in the United States
