= Charleston Workhouse Slave Rebellion =

1849 slave revolt in Charleston, South Carolina, U.S.

- Part of North American slave revolts
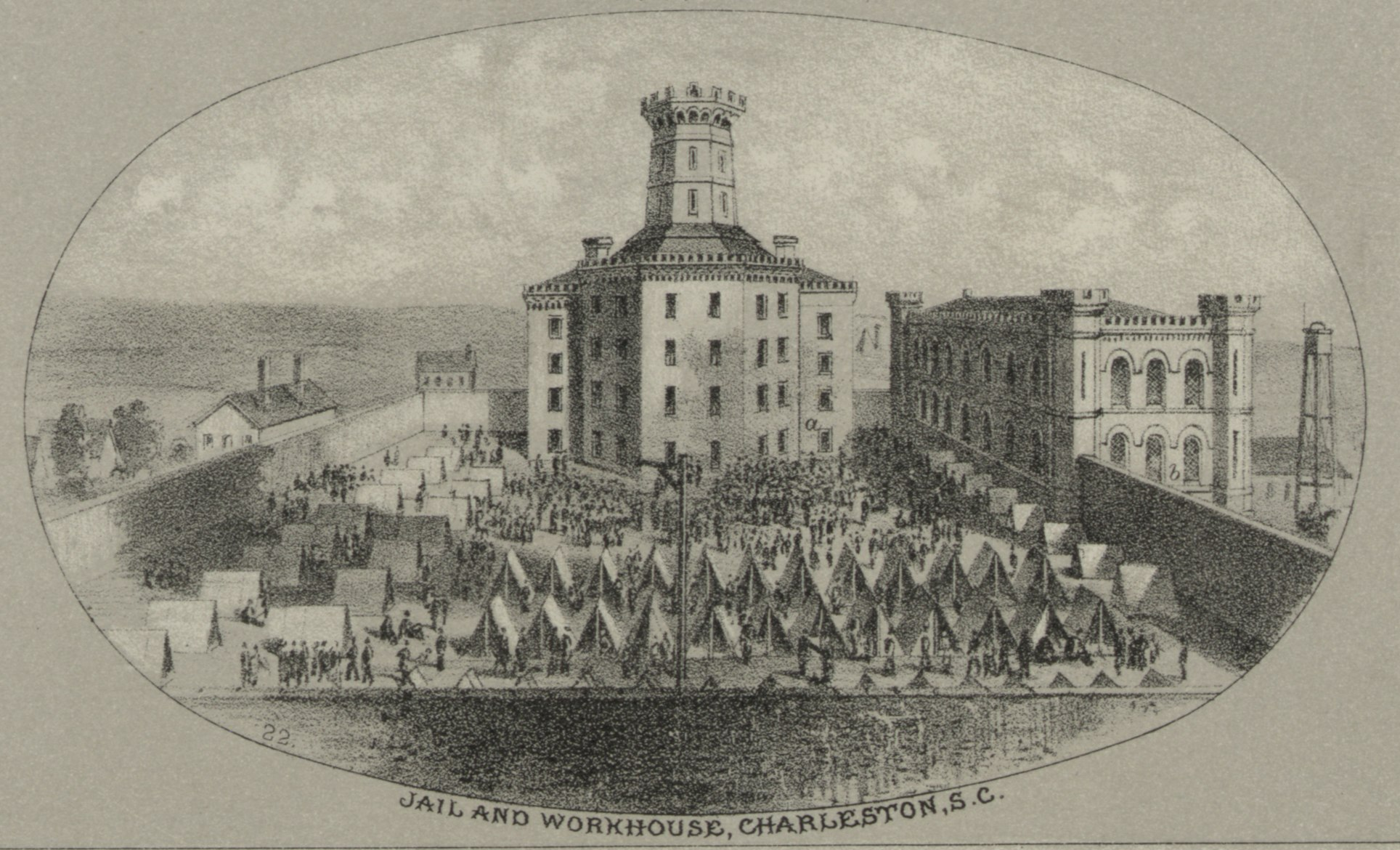
- Detail from The southern prisons of U.S. officers (LOC 2003664216)
- Date: July 13, 1849
- Duration: 1 day
- Location: Charleston, South Carolina, United States; 32.77857°N 79.9372°W
- Type: Slave rebellion
- Organized by: Nicholas Kelly
- Outcome: Rebellion suppressed Participants tried and executed or jailed
- Injuries: Several

The Charleston Workhouse Slave Rebellion was a rebellion of enslaved South Carolinians that took place in Charleston, South Carolina, in July 1849. On July 13, 1849, an enslaved man named Nicholas Kelly led an insurrection, wounding several guards with improvised weapons and liberating 37 enslaved people. Most were quickly captured, and Nicholas and two others were tried and hanged.

== Charleston Workhouse ==
Located on Magazine Street in downtown Charleston, the Charleston Workhouse was a prison and slave market where enslavers imprisoned Black people to be sold or punished. Enslavers paid the city a fee to torture their slaves. The guards inflicted public floggings, confined enslaved victims to the stocks, or forced them to walk the treadmill, a huge corn-grinding device similar to a stepping machine. Stripped naked, victims were forced to walk the treadmill until they collapsed from exhaustion or fell and suffered injuries. The Workhouse is often conflated with the Old Charleston Jail, which was located next door and shared notable architectural features. However, the operations of the Workhouse and Jail were independent of one another and unconnected.

== Nicholas Kelly ==
Nicholas was born into slavery in 1822 or 1823 in the St. Andrews District, a few miles north of Charleston. His parents were Ellen, an enslaved woman with Native American ancestry, and her enslaver, an unnamed planter. As the age of 8, Nicholas was hired out to William Kelly, an Irish-American building contractor from Philadelphia. Kelly trained Nicholas to work as a plasterer and purchased him a few years later.

In 1845, Kelly took Nicholas to New Orleans. Nicholas gained a stellar reputation as a skilled artisan for hire and attended a Roman Catholic church in New Orleans. He also demonstrated a fiercely independent spirit—in the summer of 1846, a New Orleans court sentenced him to 25 lashes for striking a white man. Kelly offered Nicholas the chance to buy his freedom for $1000, and Nicholas later claimed to have paid at least $200 or $300 toward his freedom. In 1847, Kelly, who had returned to Charleston leaving Nicholas to continue working for wages in New Orleans, forcibly returned Nicholas to Charleston. Newspapers at the time speculated that Kelly was "guilty of gross injustice and dishonesty of denying the payment and repudiating the contract," compelling Kelly to deny publicly that he was guilty of this perfidy.

Less than two weeks after his return to Charleston, Nicholas resisted when a city guardsman and a police officer, both white men, tried to search him for money at Kelly's request. One man threatened Nicholas: "I'll blow your brains out." Nicholas retorted, "Blow and be damned, I have but one life to lose, and I am ready to lose that." Nicholas hit both men with a shovel before they could handcuff him. He was charged with two counts of grievously wounding a white person. His court-appointed lawyer, Richard Yeadon, a slaveholder and editor of the Charleston Mercury, posted an insanity defense. Nicholas was convicted and sentenced to hang, but a mistrial was declared on appeal, and the new trial, which concluded in March 1848, led to Nicholas's conviction on lesser charges and his sentence to a three-year term in the Workhouse.

During his ensuing 16-month incarceration in the Workhouse, Nicholas worked as a cook and overseer and received special privileges. He intimidated his captors, who permitted him to walk the grounds freely and arm himself with a cudgel. Judge O'Neall of South Carolina's appellate court later observed that "Nicholas was known to be ungovernable, in a peculiar degree, turbulent and dangerous: being infected (or at least professing to be) by certain ideas of personal rights, inconsistent with his subjection as a slave.”

== The uprising ==
On the morning of July 13, 1849, a slave trader, John M. Gilchrist, went to the Charleston Workhouse to take custody of an unnamed enslaved woman, believed to have been Nicholas's sister. Gilchrist ostensibly intended to take her to receive medical treatment but presumably meant to sell her as soon as her health improved. Nicholas and other slaves barred Gilchrist from taking the woman and assaulted Gilchrist's enslaved valet when he tried to seize her on the slave trader's orders. Gilchrist fled. Nicholas rallied his companions, telling them, "There [will] be war today" and calling on "every man, who called himself a man, to be a man." The insurgents occupied the workhouse's courtyard and armed themselves with sledgehammer handles, pickaxes, axes, hammers, and other improvised weapons.

At Gilchrist's behest, Charleston mayor Thomas Leger Hutchinson visited the workhouse and urged the guards to regain control of the situation. At about two o'clock, workhouse keeper James C. Norris, Mayor Hutchinson, and three white guards entered the courtyard and sought to seize Nicholas, who defended himself. Twenty other enslaved people came to Nicholas's defense, and a brawl with melee weapons ensued. About half-a-dozen white men suffered serious wounds, and the insurgents burst out of the main gates into Charleston's streets. Thirty-seven enslaved people scattered and ran for freedom, as white Charlestonians mobilized to capture them. Eighteen freedom seekers were captured within 24 hours of the uprising, including Nicholas, who made it only one mile from the workhouse before rifle-toting militiamen forced him to surrender on Cannon's Bridge.

== Trials and aftermath ==
On the morning of July 14, Nicholas stood in the dock before the Charleston Court of Magistrates and Freeholders. He was convicted and sentenced to death. Nicholas's two lieutenants, George Holmes and John Toomer, went on trial on July 16 and were sentenced to death for "grievously wounding, maiming, and bruising" three white men. The trials, verdicts, and sentences all took place on the same day. On July 20, all three men were publicly hanged. Their bodies were transferred to a medical college located near the workhouse to be used for dissection.

Six of the 37 freedom seekers continued to evade capture, and the governor issued a reward of $600 for their arrest. Two surrendered on July 20 and one was captured on July 21, but the remaining three, Edward Farrar, Adam Kelly, and Edward Graves, made it about seventy miles northwest of Charleston, traversing alligator-infested swamps while evading posses equipped with guns and hounds. Graves forged a travel pass, and Farrar, who could pass for white, masqueraded as the white owner of Kelly and Graves. They were captured near Kingstree, South Carolina, on July 24. Charged with riot and insubordination, all six freedom seekers were convicted and sentenced to flogging and solitary confinement in a July 30 trial.

The enslavers of Nicholas Kelly, George Holmes, and John Toomer filed a civil suit against the Charleston city council for allegedly neglecting and mismanaging the workhouse, creating conditions for the rebellion. Juries and the state appeals court largely dismissed the lawsuits. The city council ordered an investigation into management of the workhouse, and a special committee report released in August blamed the revolt on the "great laxity of discipline" that had "prevailed for some time past." Councilors passed a resolution ordering the closure of the workhouse and the construction of a new one, and endorsed a transition from the paramilitary City Guard to a dedicated police force tasked with tight control of the Black community.

On the night of July 14, a mob of 1,200 whites descended on Charleston's Calvary Episcopal Church and threatened to demolish the building, denouncing the church and its pastor for providing religious instruction to slaves. Still under construction, the church was intended for Black congregants (most of them enslaved), and it was an offshoot of an Episcopalian church that had long had a racially mixed congregation. Mayor Hutchinson persuaded the mob to disperse, and the city convened a special committee to determine the future of the church and of religious instruction of enslaved people and freedmen generally. After a six-month study, the committee endorsed both. The church was consecrated on December 23, 1849.

== Coverage ==
Local newspapers mostly downplayed the insurrection, calling it a "riot," "outbreak," or "insubordination" in which only a few slaves had participated. In contrast, Northern abolitionists and newspapers provided extensive coverage. The Liberator, The North Star, National Intelligencer, Pennsylvania Freeman, New York Evening Post, and Boston Courier shared details of the revolt, denounced the show trials, and reported on the executions.

Until recently, historians largely overlooked this rebellion given the relative paucity of primary sources. Jeff Strickland's All For Liberty (Cambridge University Press, 2021) was the first book-length treatment of the rebellion. This monograph received positive reviews in scholarly journals.

== Consequences ==
In spite of its spontaneity, brevity, and limited casualties, the Charleston Workhouse Slave Rebellion was the most significant slave uprising to occur in South Carolina since the Denmark Vesey Conspiracy in 1822. The uprising resulted in more restrictive policing of slavery, as white vigilance and safety committees formed throughout South Carolina, vowing to root out abolitionists and control the slave population. The revolt intensified the sense of alarm among white South Carolinians, which in turn contributed to South Carolina's secession crisis of 1850–51, in the wake of the Compromise of 1850.

On July 13, 2022, the Charleston City Council and Mayor John Tecklenburg installed a commemorative plaque at the vacant lot on Magazine Street that was once the location of the Charleston Workhouse. Among other historical details, the plaque described the rebellion led by Nicholas Kelly.
