= Antebellum South Carolina =

Antebellum South Carolina is typically defined by historians as South Carolina during the period between the War of 1812, which ended in 1815, and the American Civil War, which began in 1861.

After the invention of the cotton gin in 1793, the economies of the Upcountry and the Lowcountry of the state became fairly equal in wealth. The expansion of cotton cultivation upstate led to a marked increase in the labor demand, with a concomitant rise in the slave trade. The Atlantic slave trade, or international buying and selling of slaves, was outlawed by the United States in 1808, as of which date South Carolina was the only state that had not already prohibited the importation of slaves. After that date there was a burgeoning domestic or internal, national slave trade in the U.S.

In 1822, free black craftsman and preacher Denmark Vesey was convicted for having masterminded a plan to overthrow Charlestonian whites. In reaction, whites established curfews for black people and forbade assembly of large numbers of blacks; the education of slaves was prohibited.

In 1828, John C. Calhoun decided that constitutionally, each state government (within their state) had more power than the federal government. Consequently, if a state deemed it necessary, it had the right to "nullify" any federal law (the Tariff of 1828 and the Tariff of 1832) within its boundaries. Calhoun resigned as Vice President, as he planned to become a South Carolina Senator to stop its run toward secession. He wanted to resolve problems which were inflaming his fellow Carolinians. Before federal forces arrived at Charleston in response to challenges of tariff laws, Calhoun and Henry Clay agreed upon a Compromise Tariff of 1833 to lower the rates over ten years. The nullification crisis was resolved for the time being.

== Cotton gin's effect in South Carolina ==
In 1786, leaders of the state agreed to ease tensions between Upcountry and Lowcountry citizens by moving the capital from Charleston to a location more convenient to both regions. With the capital in Charleston, Upcountry citizens had to travel two days simply to reach state government offices and state courts. The town of Columbia, South Carolina, the first city in America to take that name, was planned and erected. In 1790, the state's politicians moved in, although state offices remained in Charleston until 1865. The Lowcountry and Upcountry even had separate treasury offices with separate treasurers. In 1800, the Santee Canal was completed, connecting the Santee and Cooper Rivers. This made it possible to transport goods directly from the new capital to Charleston. In 1801, the state chartered South Carolina College (now the University of South Carolina) in Columbia.

Settled first because of its coastal access, the Lowcountry had the greater population. It had achieved early economic dominance because of wealth derived from the cultivation of both rice and long-staple cotton, a major crop. This was easier to process by hand than short-staple cotton. In the Upcountry's soil, only short-staple cotton could be cultivated. It was extremely labor-intensive to process by hand.

In 1793, Eli Whitney's invention of the cotton gin made processing of short-staple cotton economically viable. Upcountry landowners began to increase their cultivation of cotton and to import increased numbers of enslaved Africans and free blacks to raise and process the crops. The Upcountry developed its own wealthy planter class and began to work with Lowcountry planters to protect the institution of slavery.

The state's over-reliance on cotton in its economy paved the way for post-Civil War poverty in three ways: planters ruined large swaths of land by over-cultivation, small farmers in the upcountry reduced subsistence farming in favor of cotton, and greater profits in other states led to continued departure of many talented people, both white and black. From 1820 to 1860 nearly 200,000 whites left the state, mostly for Deep South states and frontier opportunities. Many of them took enslaved African-Americans with them; other slaves were sold to traders for plantations in the Deep South. In addition, because planters wore out new lands in-state or moved rather than invest in fertilizer or manufacturing, South Carolina did not begin to industrialize until much later.

== Nullification crisis ==
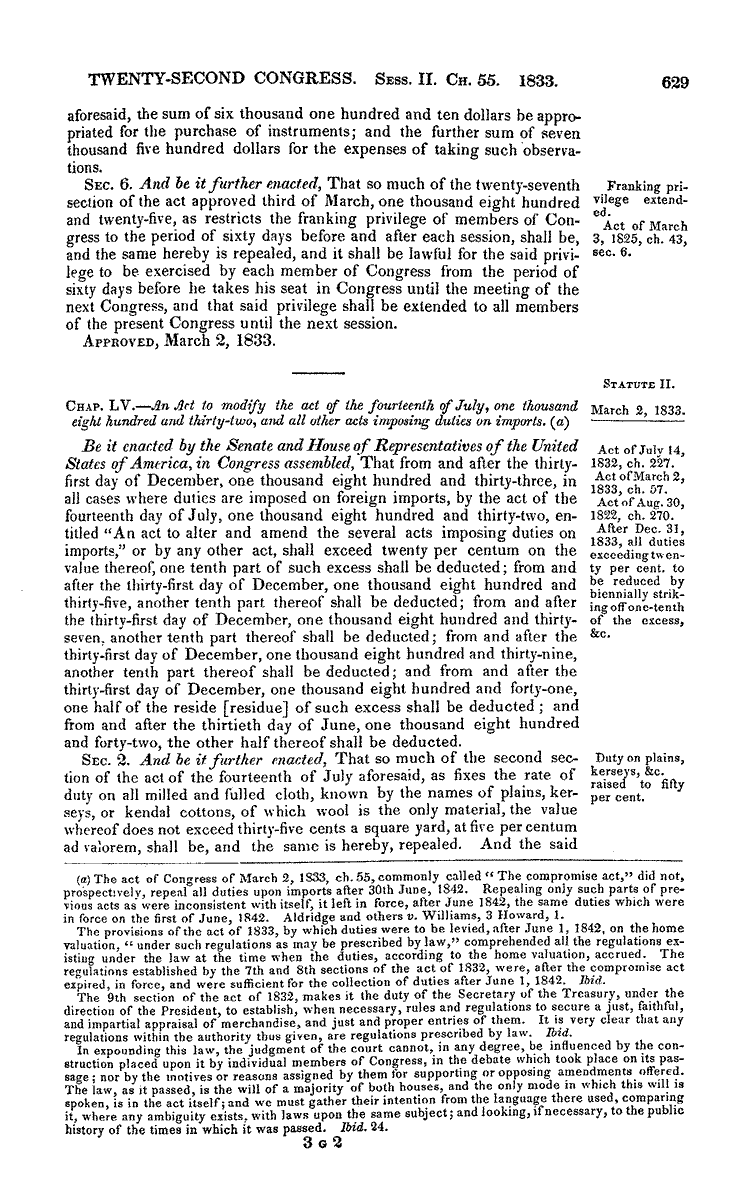
An image of The Compromise Tariff of 1833 that would lower rates on tariffs over 10 years in an agreement between John C. Calhoun and Henry Clay.

In 1811, British ships plundered American ships, inspiring outraged "War Hawk" representatives into declaring the War of 1812. During the war, tariffs on imported goods were raised to support America's military efforts. Afterward, as the North began to create manufacturing centers, Northern lawmakers passed higher taxes on imports to protect the new industries. Because the South had an agricultural economy, it did not benefit from the tariffs and believed they interfered with the South's trade with Great Britain and Europe based on cotton and rice.

In the 1820s, many South Carolinians began to talk of seceding from the union to operate as an independent state with trade laws tailored to its own best interests. Even South Carolina-born John C. Calhoun, who had begun as a Federalist favoring a strong centralized government, began to change his views. He believed rights of his home state were being trampled for the "good" of the North, though he also recognized the political dangers of secession. In 1828, Calhoun decided upon the primacy of "states' rights", a doctrine which he would support for the rest of his life. He believed that constitutionally, the state government of each state had more power within that state than did the federal government. Consequently, if a state deemed it necessary, it had the right to "nullify" any federal law within its boundaries.

To most South Carolinians, this sounded like a reasonable compromise. Some in the state, such as Joel J. Poinsett, novelist William Gilmore Simms, and James L. Petigru, believed that while a state had the full right to secede from the Union if it chose, it had no right, as long as it remained part of the Union, to nullify a federal law. The federal government believed the concept of nullification was as an attack on its powers. When in 1832, South Carolina's government quickly "nullified" the hated tariffs passed by the full Congress, President Andrew Jackson declared this an act of open rebellion and ordered U.S. ships to South Carolina to enforce the law.

In December 1832, Calhoun resigned as Jackson's vice president. He was the only vice president to resign until Spiro Agnew did so, 141 years later. Calhoun planned to become a senator in South Carolina to stop its run toward secession. He wanted to work on solving the problems that troubled his fellow Carolinians. Before federal forces arrived at Charleston, Calhoun and Senator Henry Clay agreed upon a compromise. They had often worked effectively together before. Clay persuaded Congress to pass the Compromise Tariff of 1833, which lowered the tariff gradually over 10 years (see copy on the page). The passage of this tariff prevented armed conflict.

The debate about the relative importance of states' rights versus federal power became a dividing line between the North and South. The political discussion was related to the differing rates of growth of the regions. Increased immigration to the North had meant a faster rate of growth in its population and gave it an advantage in representation, despite the 3/5 compromise that allowed the South to use its enslaved population in figuring Congressional representation.

The 19th century religious revival in the South had first been led by Methodist and Baptist preachers who opposed slavery. Gradually they began to adopt the Southern viewpoint. The Methodist and Baptist churches grew as their preachers accommodated slaveholding as a principle of continuity. Southern slaveholders looked to the Bible for language to control slaves. Southern slaveholders generally saw abolitionists as dangerous, self-righteous meddlers who would be better off tending to themselves than passing judgement on the choices of others. Pro-slavery apologists argued that the Northerners had no place in the debate over the morality of slavery, because they could not own slaves and would therefore not suffer the societal impacts that manumission would mean to the South.

The effect of slave rebellions, such as the Denmark Vesey conspiracy of 1822, the Charleston Workhouse Slave Rebellion of 1849, and John Brown's raid on Harper's Ferry in 1859, was to reduce moderate abolitionists to silence, particularly in the South. These events inflamed fears and galvanized Southerners into an anti-abolitionist stance that effectively ended reasoned debate on the issue. South Carolinians had earlier tolerated slavery as a necessary evil. In an evolving concept, they came to proclaim slavery a positive good, a civilizing benefit to the enslaved, and a proper response to the "natural" differences between whites and blacks.

Apologists such as Thomas Harper argued that the wage-employee system of the North was more exploitative than slavery itself. So avid had this defense become that by 1856, Governor James Hopkins Adams recommended a resumption of the Foreign Slave Trade. A powerful minority of slaveholders had begun arguing that every white man should be legally required to own at least one slave, which they claimed would give an interest in the issue and instill responsibility. The Charleston Mercury denounced the slave trade; a number of newly captured slaves were imported into Charleston against federal law.

== Vesey plot and the Indian Removal Act ==
Since colonial times, South Carolina had always been home to a sizable population of free blacks. Many were descended from enslaved mulattoes freed by their white fathers/owners. Others had been freed for faithful service. Some African-Americans purchased their freedom with portions of earnings they were allowed to keep when being "hired out". As long as there had been free blacks, they made the white population nervous.

In 1822, a free black craftsman and preacher, Denmark Vesey, was convicted of having masterminded a plan for (both enslaved and free) African-Americans to overthrow Charlestonian whites. Afterward, whites established curfews and forbade assembly of large numbers of African- Americans. They prohibited educating enslaved African-Americans, as they believed slaves' learning to read and write would make them unhappy and less compliant. Free African-Americans posed a challenge to slavery by their very presence. South Carolina leaders prohibited slaveholders from freeing their slaves without a special decree from the state legislature. This was the same path that Virginia had taken when its slaveholders became uneasy about freedmen.

Like Denmark Vesey, most of South Carolina's free blacks lived in Charleston, where there were opportunities for work and companionship. A free African American subculture developed there. Charlestonian blacks held more than 55 different occupations, including a variety of artisan and craft jobs. Some African Americans, such as Sumter cotton gin-maker William Ellison, amassed great fortunes. He did so in the same fashion that most wealthy whites had — by using the labor of black slaves.

As settlers pressed against western lands controlled by Native Americans, violence repeatedly erupted between them. Andrew Jackson came to the Presidency determined to pave the way for American settlers. In 1830, he signed the Indian Removal Act, by which he offered Native Americans land in unsettled areas west of the Mississippi River, in exchange for their lands in existing states. While some tribes accepted this solution, others resisted. By this time, the Cherokee Nation had been mostly pushed west and south out of South Carolina into Georgia.

== Mexican–American War ==
South Carolina strongly supported the Mexican–American War, as its leaders believed success would allow acquisition of additional lands open to slavery. They hoped for slaveholding states to acquire greater power in the U.S. Congress. The State raised a regiment of volunteers known as the Palmetto Regiment. The Palmetto Regiment was prepared and trained for the Mexican–American War by cadets and faculty at The Citadel, The Military College of South Carolina in Charleston. The Citadel created a training system which is known today as boot camp or recruit training, to prepare the men for combat. The Citadel cadets who trained the Palmetto Regiment were known as drillmasters, a term which later evolved into drill instructors. Under Pierce M. Butler, J.P. Dickinson, and A.H. Gladden, the Palmetto Regiment's flag entered Mexico City before any other. Chiefly due to disease, however, only 300 men returned alive of the 1,100 South Carolinian volunteers who fought.

As the Mexican–American War drew to a close, the introduction of the Wilmot Proviso in the U.S. Congress raised sectional tensions, this time over the issue of slavery. Introduced by a northern congressman as a rider on a war appropriations bill, the proviso specified that slavery would not be permitted in any territory ceded by Mexico. In the debate which followed, both national political parties split along sectional (regional) lines. The South had furnished more men for the war (435,248 versus the North's 22,136) and expected this sacrifice to be rewarded with new slave states carved out of the conquered lands. Although twice passed in the House of Representatives, the proviso was defeated in the Senate. However, the contention over extending slavery into new American territories was far from over; ultimately it was one of the causes of the American Civil War.

== Collapse of the Second Party System ==
The collapse of the Second Party System in the mid-1850s had a profound impact on the state of South Carolina. With the Whig party virtually non-existent in the state, the Democratic party took over the local political apparatus and elected only democrats to represent South Carolina in Congress. South Carolina essentially operated effectively as a one-party state near the end of the antebellum period. There was a distinct lack of political representation in the state government and its local government districts, which effected voter turnout. The rate of turnover rarely exceeded fifty percent in the antebellum period. Most of the congressional elections were non-competitive and involved no opposing candidates at all.

Plantation elites dominated the politics of the state and were very successful in pushing their pro-slavery politics under the guise of democracy. In short, planter politicians heavily promoted democracy through contradictory anti-democratic means such as denying other non-planter politicians from running in local elections as previously touched upon in the Second Party System's collapse. Other methods included South Carolinian representatives in the House going to extremes on the house floor and threatening secession or walking out on the voting of bills if the state did not get its way.

== South Carolinian exceptionalism ==
South Carolina was an outlier when it came to antebellum southern politics. A majority of the south's politics was South Carolinian Politics, especially in the deep south. The states of Georgia, Alabama, Florida, Mississippi, Louisiana, and Texas had more in common politically and economically than the states of the upper south. All of the states in the deep south were plantation-based economies relying on the production of cotton. South Carolina was the only state in the upper south whose enslaved population made up the majority. The preservation of slavery also relied on territorial expansion, which is why most southern states supported the Mexican American War of 1846-1848, and it is the same reason why South Carolinian representatives pushed hard in an attempt to reopen the African slave trade in Congress but were unsuccessful, providing another reason why the state tried to secede from the Union in 1860 following the election of Abraham Lincoln.

== Secession commissioners ==
When Abraham Lincoln was elected the 16th President of the United States, South Carolina took the opportunity to send out its own commissioners to convince the rest of the south to join their state in secession from the Union. As previously stated, a majority of Southern politics was dominated by the state of South Carolina and the secession commissioners found success in the deep south. The South Carolinian secessionist commissioner to Georgia launched a verbal attack on the victory of the Republican Party. "The North is firmly in the grip of a blind and relentless fanaticism and a Lincoln administration would lead inevitably to southern degradation and dishonor.". South Carolina seceded from the Union on 20 December 1860. Six more southern states would follow between December 1860 and January 1861, initiating the American Civil War.

== Protest of the Negro Act of 1740 ==
John Belton O'Neall summarized the Negro Act of 1740, in his written work, The Negro Law of South Carolina, when he stated: "A slave may, by the consent of his master, acquire and hold personal property. All, thus required, is regarded in law as that of the master." Across the South, state supreme courts supported the position of this law.

In 1848, O'Neall was the only one to express protest against the Act, arguing for the propriety of receiving testimony from enslaved Africans (many of whom, by 1848, were Christians) under oath:

"Negroes (slave or free) will feel the sanctions of an oath, with as much force as any of the ignorant classes of white people, in a Christian country."

== See also ==
- Christopher Werner, maker of the "Iron Palmetto", commemorating the eponymous regiment that fought in the Mexican–American War
- History of the Southern United States
- Old Slave Mart, a museum on the site of a 19th-century slave auction facility, in downtown Charleston
