= Exchange and Provost =

- Old Exchange and Provost Dungeon
- U.S. National Register of Historic Places
- U.S. National Historic Landmark
- U.S. National Historic Landmark District – Contributing property
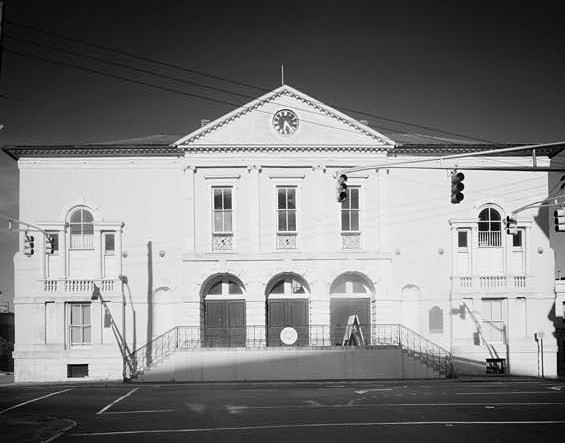
- Exchange and Provost in 1977

- Location within South Carolina Location within the United States
- Location: E. Bay and Broad Streets, Charleston, South Carolina
- Coordinates: 32°46′31″N 79°55′38″W
- Built: 1767
- Architect: William Rigby Naylor
- Architectural style: Georgian
- Part of: Charleston Historic District (ID66000964)
- NRHP reference No.: 69000160

Significant dates
- Added to NRHP: December 17, 1969
- Designated NHL: November 7, 1973
- Designated NHLDCP: October 9, 1960

The Old Exchange & Provost Dungeon, also known as the Custom House, and The Exchange, is a historic building at East Bay and Broad Streets in Charleston, South Carolina. Built in 1767–1771, it has served a variety of civic institutional functions, including notably as a prisoner of war facility operated by British forces during the American Revolutionary War. The building was designated a National Historic Landmark in 1973. It is now a museum operated by the Daughters of the American Revolution.

== Description ==
The Old Exchange is located on the east side of Charleston's historic downtown area, at the northeast corner of East Bay and Broad Streets. It is a two-story masonry building, capped by a hipped roof with cupola and set on a high brick basement. The main facade faces west, and has a projecting three-bay gabled section at its center with entrances recessed in three round-arch openings on the first floor, and sash windows set in bays articulated by Ionic pilasters on the second. The flanking walls each have a Palladian window set on a brick base with balustrade.

== History ==
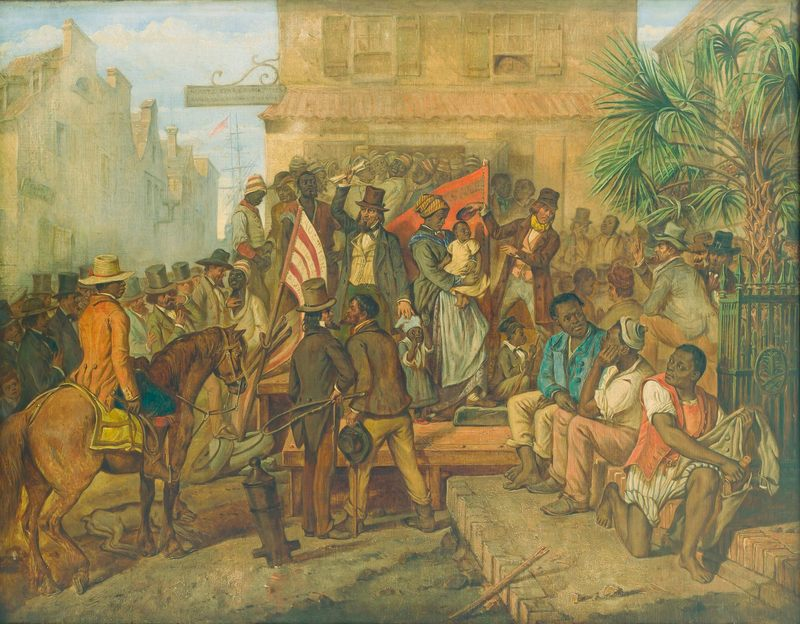
Eyre Crowe's Auction at Charleston depicts Alonzo J. White conducting a slave auction on the plaza north of the Exchange on March 10, 1853, at 11 a.m., of a "very prime gang of NINETY-SIX NEGROS who have been accustomed to the culture of Rice on the Combahee River, until within the last five years they cultivated Sea Island Cotton"

The Exchange was built from 1767 to 1771 by South Carolina's provincial government, and was used during the 18th century for a variety of civic functions, including as a custom house, public market, public meeting place, and jail. During the American Revolution, confiscated tea was stored here in 1774, and it is where South Carolina's revolutionary leadership councils were held. After the British captured the city in 1780, it was used as a barracks, and its basement was used as a military prison. In 2012, a study was completed of the building's use as a British prison during the Revolutionary War. Soon after taking control of Charleston in 1780, the British started housing prisoners in the Exchange, but not exclusively in the "dungeon". The investigation was able to document at least 120 prisoners held in the Exchange, but there were many more whose identities could not be discovered. The facility was not exclusively used for Colonial prisoners, and at least some British soldiers were held there too.

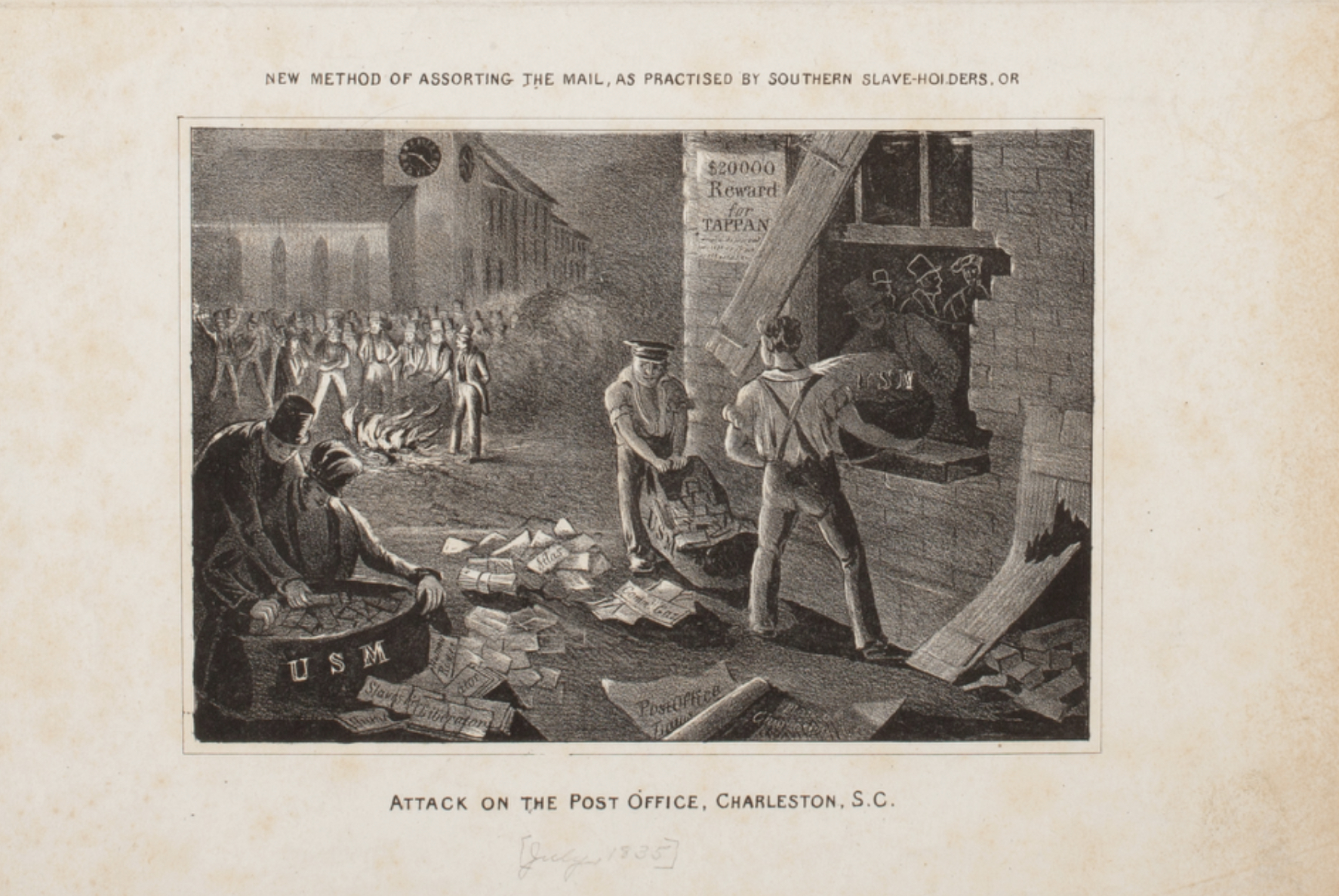
The American Anti-Slavery Society in 1835 mailed a large quantity of abolitionist publications to individuals in the South. Mail with these publications was taken from the Charleston S.C. Post Office and publicly burned. Notice reward poster for [Arthur] Tappan. The men taking the bags labelled U.S. Mail from the Post Office are workingmen, but those standing around the bonfire are well dressed

The building housed the South Carolina convention to ratify the United States Constitution in 1788, and was the site of many of the events in George Washington's week-long stay in Charleston. He was greeted by a crowd on the balcony. The building continued as an Exchange until the 19th century, when it also became a post office. According to Frederic Bancroft in Slave-Trading in the Old South, "From colonial days until after the middle of the nineteenth century from several hundred to many thousand slaves were annually sold to the highest bidders, in front or just north of this building. As the postoffice was long in the Exchange, visitors as well as residents called there daily for their mail, and, after about 10 A. M. on sale-days, were sure to notice the crowd that gathered about the slaves." During the 19th century, the postmaster defended the Exchange's shipment of abolitionist pamphlets from angry Charlestonian rioters.

In the American Civil War, the building remained a Confederate post office, but was hit by several shells during the war, and thus abandoned. In 1913, the building was granted to the Daughters of the American Revolution, who have preserved it ever since. In World War I, the building served as the army headquarters of General Leonard Wood and the United States Lighthouse Service—the latter having been in the building since the late 1800s. In World War II, the building not only served as a USO facility and canteen for troops, but served as the Coastal Picket Station for the Sixth Naval District of the United States Coast Guard. In 1965, the Half-Moon Battery, a 1698 fortification, was discovered underneath the building.

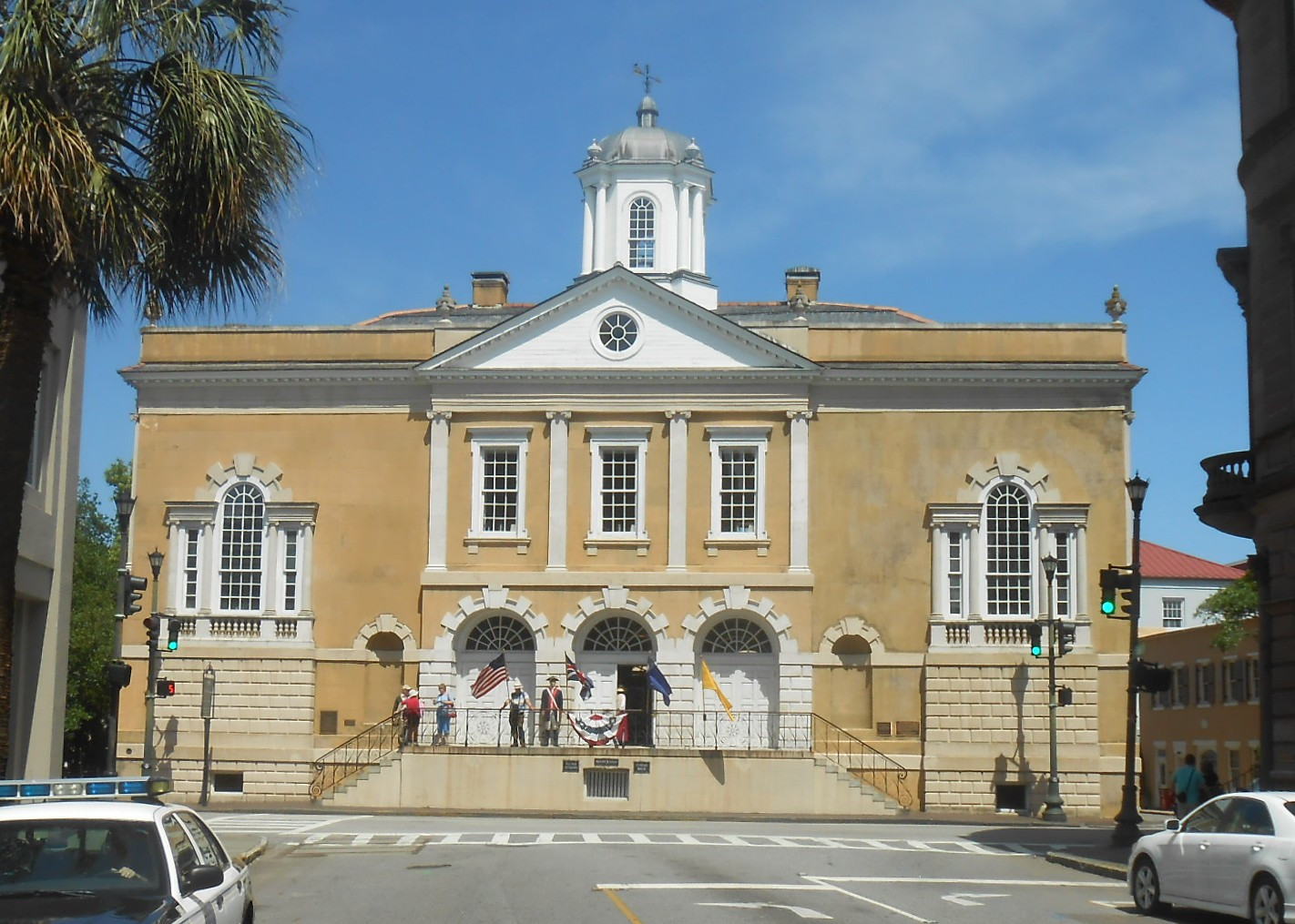
The Customs House, seen here in 2013, stands at the foot of Broad Street in Charleston, South Carolina.

The building's first cupola was damaged by a hurricane in the early 1800s. The second deteriorated before the great earthquake of 1886, and the third was not placed until 1981 when the building opened as a museum.

The building is owned by the South Carolina Society of the Daughters of the American Revolution, who operate guided costumed tours that include all three floors of the building. The Provost Dungeon once had animatronic figures that tell stories of pirates and colonial days, but these animatronics have been supplanted by personal dungeon tours by docents.

== See also ==
- Old Charleston Jail and Charleston Workhouse
- Old Slave Mart
- List of National Historic Landmarks in South Carolina
- National Register of Historic Places listings in Charleston, South Carolina
- List of buildings and structures used in the slave trade in the United States
