= Old Charleston Jail =

Event venue in Charleston, South Carolina

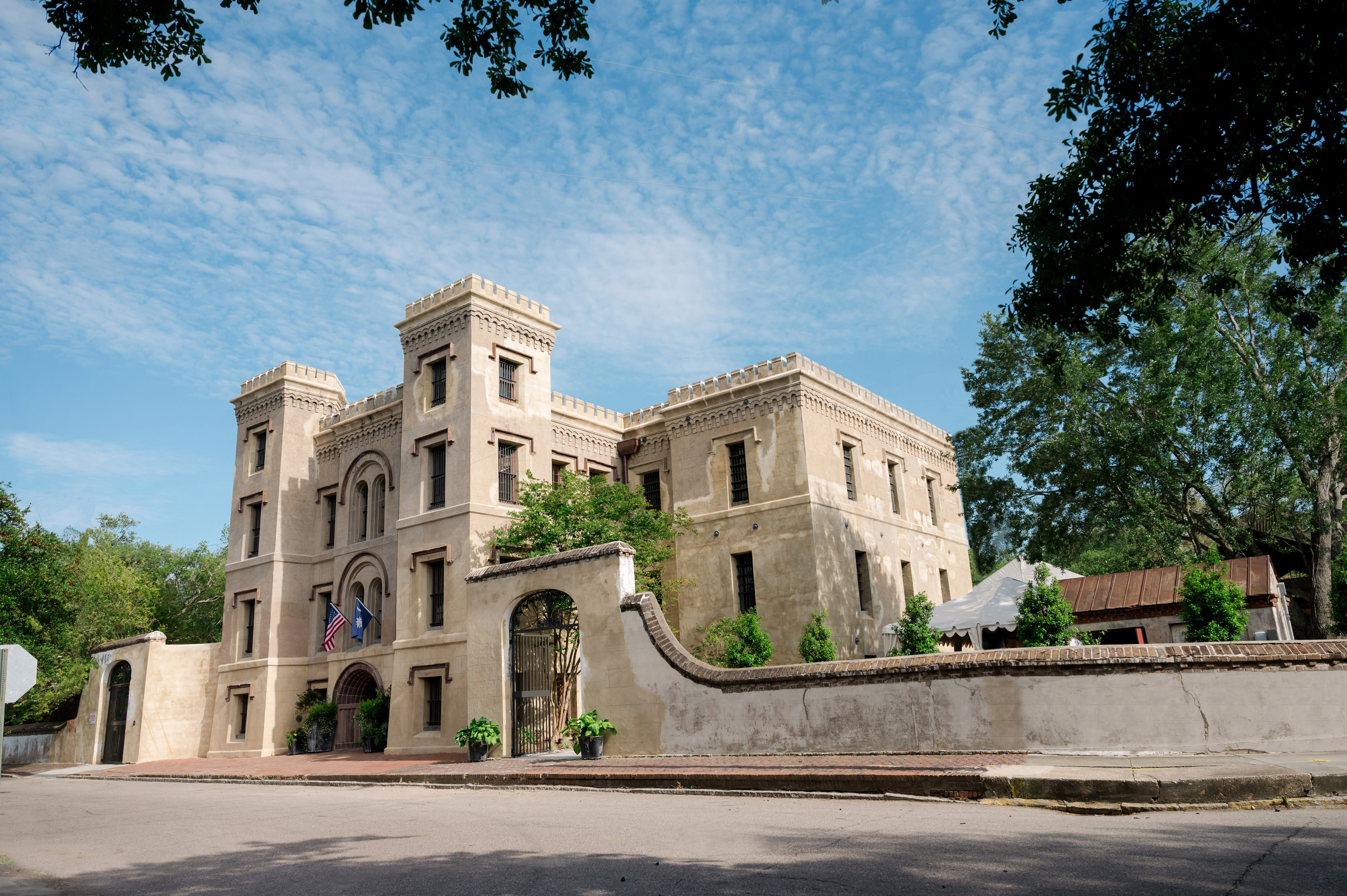

- Location of the Old Charleston Jail in South Carolina
- 32°46′42″N 79°56′13″W
- Location: 21 Magazine Street, Charleston, South Carolina

Site notes
- Governing body: U.S. National Park Service

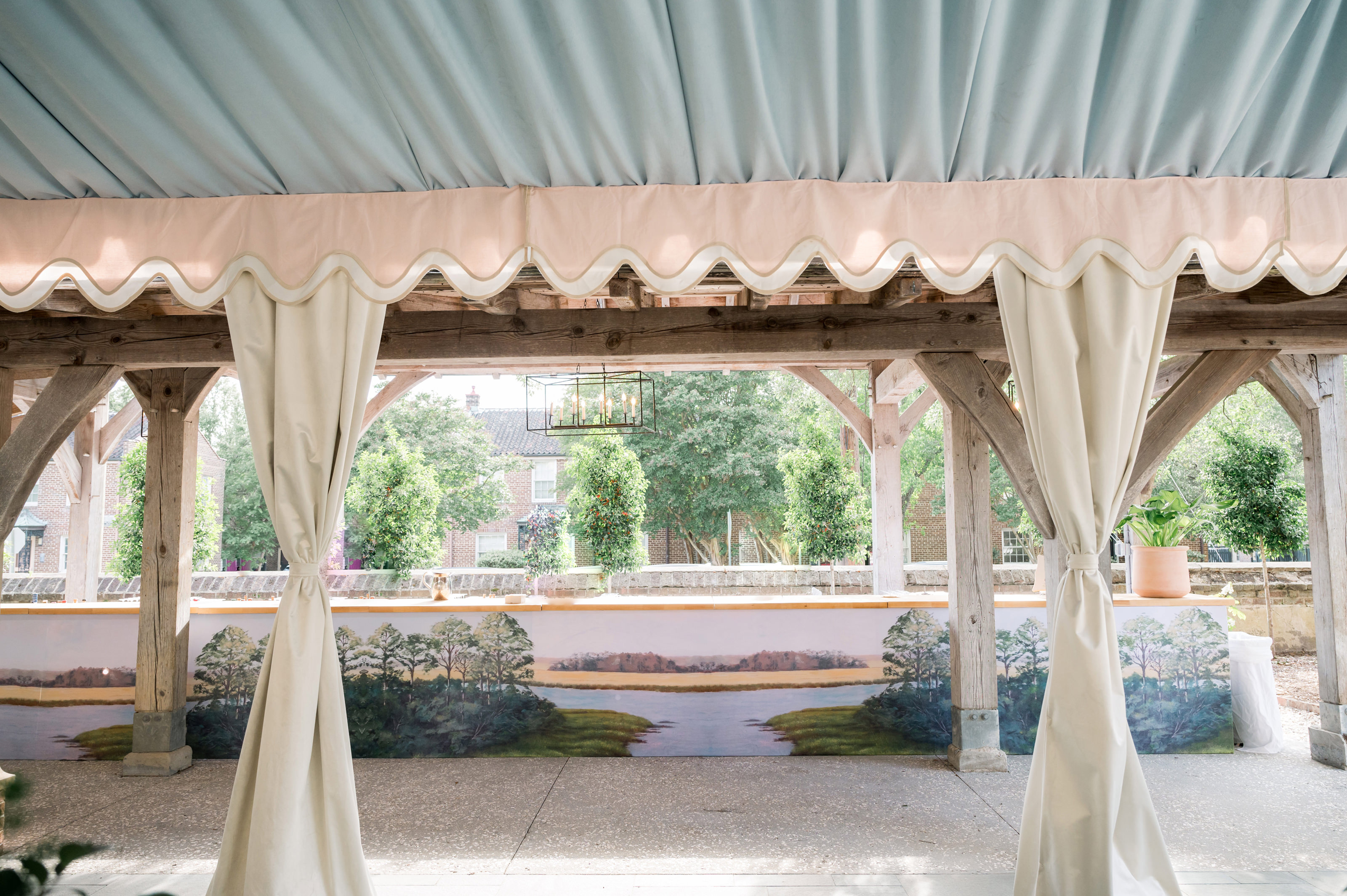
Twenty-One Magazine event venue

The Old Charleston Jail is a structure of historical and architectural significance located at 21 Magazine Street in Charleston, South Carolina, United States. Operational between 1802 and 1939, the jail held many notable figures, among them Denmark Vesey, Union officers and Colored Troops during the American Civil War, and high-seas pirates. The Old Charleston Jail went through a renovation starting in 2016. It is now an event venue and museum.

== History ==
The Old Charleston Jail was originally located on a four-acre parcel set aside for public use in 1680, at the time of Charleston's earliest settlement, designated as public land for "institutions serving the poor, the sick, and the dispossessed" including hospitals, burial grounds, and jails.

Operating as the Charleston County Jail from 1802 until 1939, it housed Charleston's most infamous criminals, and U.S. Army and Navy prisoners of war during the Civil War. When the Jail was constructed in 1802 it consisted of four stories, topped with a two-story octagonal tower. Charleston architects Barbot & Seyle were responsible for 1855 alterations to the building, including a rear octagonal wing, expansions to the main building and the Romanesque Revival details. This octagonal wing replaced a fireproof wing with individual cells, designed by Robert Mills in 1822, five years earlier than his notable Fireproof Building. The 1886 earthquake badly damaged the tower and top story of the main building, and these were subsequently removed.

The Old Charleston Jail housed a great variety of inmates. John and Lavinia Fisher, and other members of their gang, convicted of highway robbery in the Charleston Neck region were imprisoned here in 1819 to 1820. Some of the last 19th-century high-seas pirates were jailed here in 1822 while they awaited hanging. The Jail was active after the discovery of Denmark Vesey's planned slave revolt. Although the main trials were held elsewhere, four white men convicted of supporting the 1822 plot were imprisoned here. Tradition holds that Vesey spent his last days in the Jail before being hanged, although no extant document indicates this. William Moultrie, General during the American Revolution and later Governor of South Carolina, allegedly spent a short time in debtor's prison at the Jail. During the Civil War, Confederate and Federal prisoners of war were incarcerated here. Most notably were numerous African American soldiers from the 54th Massachusetts Regiment captured after their assault on Fort Wagner in July 1863. It is one of more than 1400 historically significant buildings within the Charleston Old and Historic District. In 1965, the city zoning board approved its use as a museum and gift store.

== Notable inmates ==
- Civil War POWs
- Denmark Vesey, accused of planning a slave revolt, executed in 1822
- High-seas pirates
- Jacque Alexander Tardy held from 1825–27 for attempt to steal a pilot boat

== Renovation ==
In 2016, Landmark Enterprises purchased the Old Charleston Jail and transformed it into an event venue now known as Twenty-One Magazine. The renovation reportedly cost $15 million and includes office space for lease. In 2024, this property received a Carolopolis Exterior Award from the Preservation Society of Charleston. As of May 2026, national magazine Garden & Gun is one of the businesses to take up residency, moving its headquarters from the Cigar Factory on East Bay St to the Old Charleston Jail at 21 Magazine St.

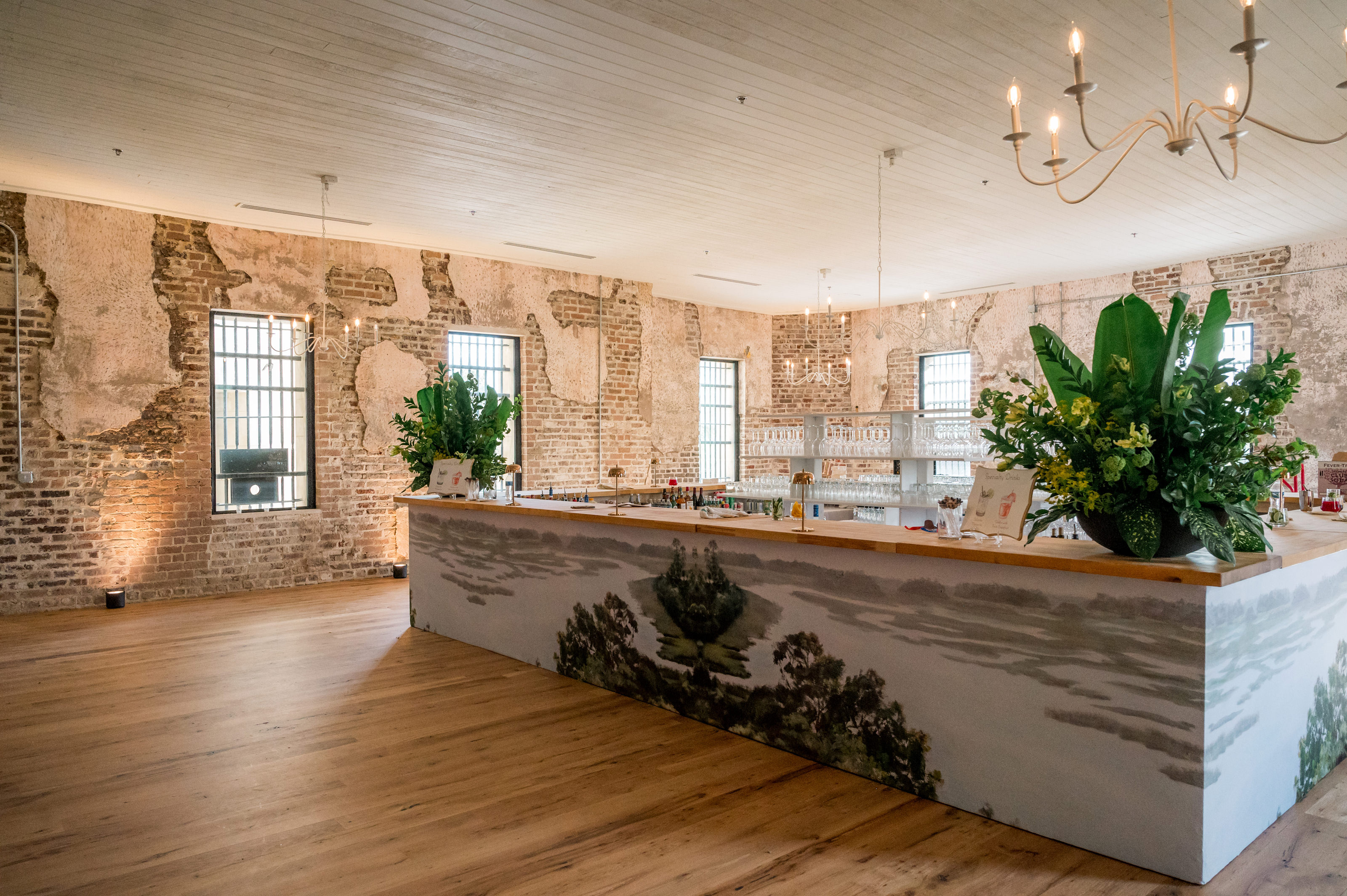
Twenty-One Magazine

== Tours ==
Travel Tours of the Old Charleston Jail have been available since 2003, and the Jail has become popular with tourists as well as on television. It has been featured in a variety of television shows including Travel Channel and Food Network.

== See also ==
- Exchange and Provost
- Waterfront Park (Charleston)
