= List of Kentucky slave traders =

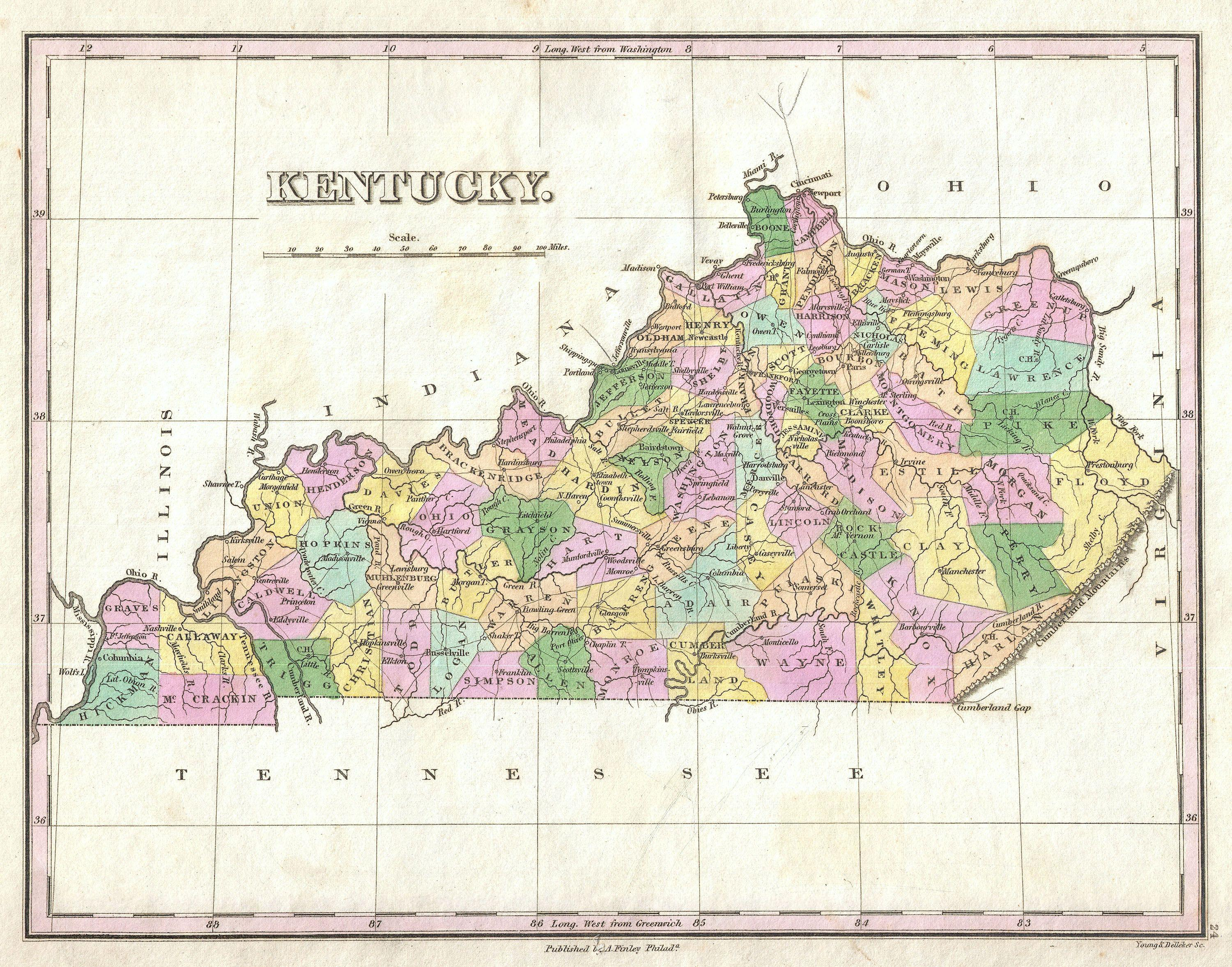
Map of Kentucky engraved by Young and Delleker for the 1827 edition of Anthony Finley's General Atlas (Geographicus Rare Antique Maps)

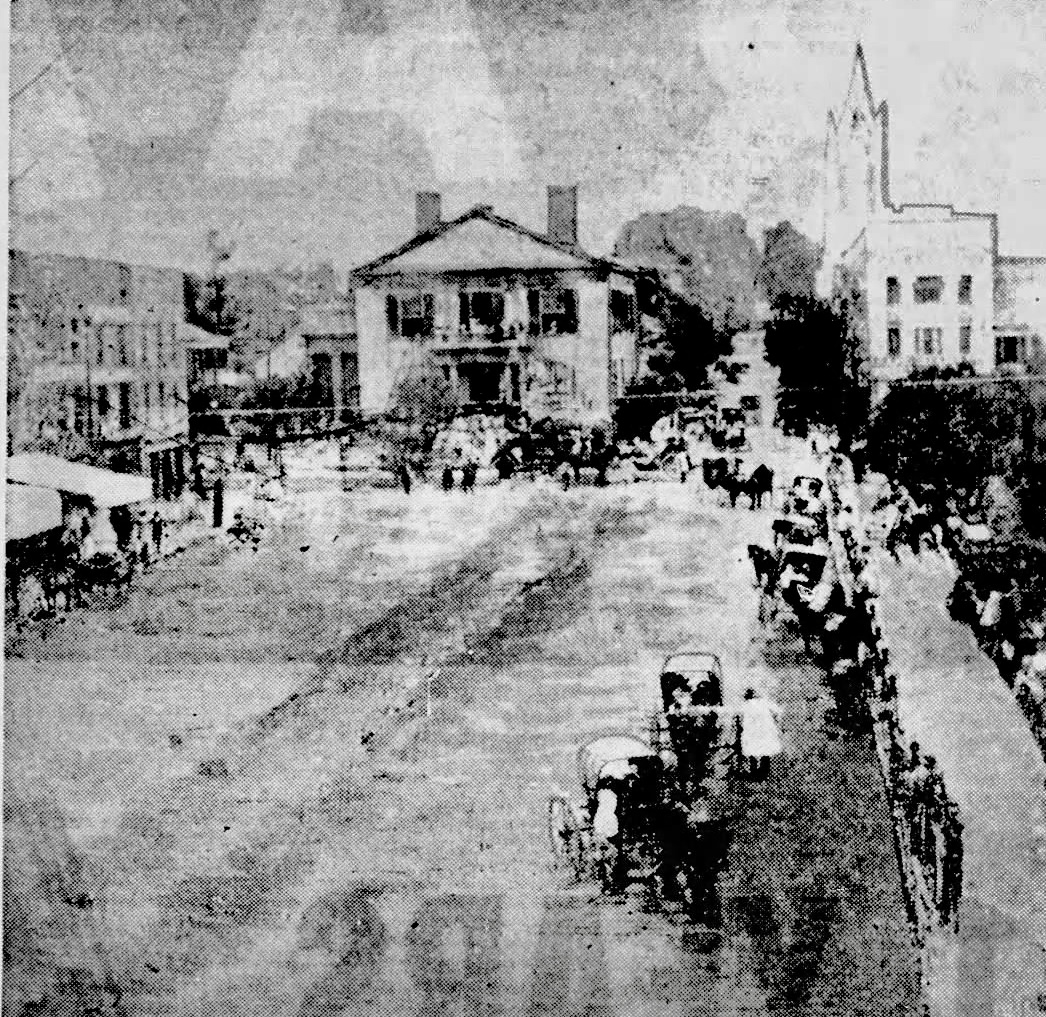
Cheapside market in Lexington, Kentucky in the 1850s

This is a list of slave traders active in the U.S. state of Kentucky from settlement until the end of the American Civil War in 1865.

- A. Blackwell, Lexington
- Lewis Allen, "professional kidnapper," Maysville
- David Anderson, Kentucky and Baltimore (?)
- John W. Anderson, Mason County
- Jordan Arterburn
- Tarlton Arterburn
- Atkinson & Richardson, Tennessee, Kentucky, and St. Louis, Mo.
- J. H. Bagby
- J. G. Barclay & Co.
- Kinchen Battoe, Kentucky
- William Beck, Glasgow, Ky.
- Sam Berry, Georgetown, Ky., described as "a noted negro thief and journeyman negro trader"
- Blackwell and Ballard
- Blackwell, Murphy, and Ferguson, Kentucky and Forks of the Road, Natchez, Miss.
- Washington Bolton, Lexington
- Bolton, Dickens & Co.
- Boyce, Kentucky
- Boyce, near Frankfort, Ky.
- Return Bradley, Clark County, and New Orleans
- Dr. Brady, Hopkinsville, Ky.
- Robert B. "Old Bob" Brashear, Salem, Va. and Alexandria, Va. and New Orleans and Louisville, Ky.
- P. N. Brent, Lexington
- Booz Browner, Robards gang trading agent and kidnapper
- J. C. Buckles
- William Campbell, Georgetown
- Jacob T. Cassell
- Joshua Cates, Christian County, Ky.
- John Clark, Louisville
- John R. Cleary, Lexington
- David Cobb, Lexington, Alabama, and Mississippi
- J. Cockrill, Lexington
- Asa Collins, Lexington
- H. Collons, Lexington
- A. B. Colwell, Lexington
- Corbin, South Carrollton on Green River
- Mr. Cooper, Kentucky
- William Cotton, Bardstown
- Thomas W. Davis, Pine Grove, Lexington–Leestown Road
- William P. Davis, Louisville
- E. R. Dean
- R. H. Elam
- George Ernwine
- James H. Farish, Lexington
- George Ferguson, Lexington
- Floyd, Kentucky and Natchez
- Ford, Kentucky, Mississippi, and New Orleans
- Hugh L. Foster
- Mr. Gains [Gaines?], Boone County and Mississippi
- Matthew Garrison
- J. C. Gentry, Louisville
- Austin Gibbons
- Ben. Gilbert, Louisville
- Gray & Stewart
- C. C. Green & Co.
- Pierce Griffin, Lexington
- Henry Hall, Kentucky, Tennessee, and Mississippi
- John Harris, Kentucky, possibly kidnapping in Richmond, Indiana
- Harrison, Washington County, Ky.
- Henry H. Haynes, Kentucky, and Nashville, Tenn.
- J. M. Heady, Lexington
- O. Henley, Lexington
- David Heran
- J. M. Hewett
- William Hill, Robards gang trading agent and kidnapper
- W. A. Holland
- Judge Houston, Hopkinsville, Ky.
- Michael Hughes, Lexington
- Hughes & Downing, Lexington
- Hughes and Neil, Boone County and Louisville
- John Hunter, Louisville
- Jordan and Tolt, Louisville and New Orleans
- Kelly
- Thomas Kelly, Louisville
- William H. Kelly
- James Kelly, Kentucky
- Hiram Lawrence, Lexington
- Joshua Lee, Louisville
- Lipscum & Day, Frankfort
- R. W. Lucas, Lexington
- John Madinglay, Nelson County
- George W. Maraman, Robards gang trading agent and kidnapper
- Silas Marshall, Lexington
- George S. Marshall
- James G. Mathers, Lexington
- Bill Matney
- John Mattingly, Louisville and Lexington and St. Louis, Mo.
- Neal McCann, Lexington
- McGowan, Lexington
- McGowan, Woolford County
- James McMillin, Maysville
- Thomas B. Megowan, Lexington
- John Miller, Green County and Mississippi
- John T. Montjoy, Robards gang trading agent and kidnapper
- Muir, Ormsby & Co.
- Felix G. Murphy, Lexington
- Bill Myers, Madison County
- Elijah Noble, Frankfort
- Joseph H. Northcutt, Lexington
- Northcutt, Marshall & Co.
- Warren Offutt, Woodford County, and Natchez
- Zeb Offutt, "a negro stealer"
- Ellis Oldham, Madison County
- Otterman, Louisville
- Owens, Georgetown
- George Payton, Robards gang trading agent and kidnapper
- Peck, Washington County, Ky.
- Benjamin Ward Powell, Natchez, Miss., Louisville, Ky. and New Orleans
- Thomas A. Powell, Louisville and Montgomery, Ala. and St. Louis, and New Orleans
- William A. Pullum, Lexington
- Pulliam, Lexington
- Redford
- Gabriel Reed
- Reynolds, Louisville, Ky.
- Alfred O. Robards, Robards gang trading agent and kidnapper
- Lewis C. Robards, Lexington
- David Ross, Louisville, Ky.
- Franklin B. Rust, Covington
- A. C. Scott
- Austin H. Slaughter
- William Stansberry, Kentucky and Mississippi
- Everett Stillwell, Robards gang trading agent and kidnapper
- Edward Stone, Bourbon County and Harrison County ("Bluegrass area")
- John Stickney, Louisville
- John Stringer
- William F. Talbott, Louisville and Lexington
- Joseph Thompson, Harrison County
- Robert H. Thompson, Lexington
- Unidentified traders, Mt. Sterling
- J. Watson, Louisville
- Richard Watson, Louisville, Ky. and New Orleans
- Silas Wheeler, Clinton County
- Robert K. White
- W. F. White, Lexington
- W. P. White & Co., Lexington
- Wilson, Shelbyville and Lexington
- Emanuel Wolfe
- Heaman Wood
- Rodes Woods, Robards gang trading agent and kidnapper
- Charles H. Woolford
- Henry Young, "professional kidnapper," Maysville
- John S. Young, Louisville

== See also ==
- History of slavery in Kentucky
- List of Alabama slave traders
- List of District of Columbia slave traders
- List of Georgia and Florida slave traders
- List of Maryland and Delaware slave traders
- List of Missouri slave traders
- List of Texas slave traders
- Family separation in American slavery
- List of largest slave sales in the United States
- Movement to reopen the transatlantic slave trade
- Kidnapping into slavery in the United States
- Bibliography of the slave trade in the United States
- Slave markets and slave jails in the United States

== Sources ==
- Astor, Aaron (2012). Rebels on the Border: Civil War, Emancipation, and the Reconstruction of Kentucky and Missouri. Conflicting Worlds: New Dimensions of the American Civil War. Baton Rouge: Louisiana State University Press. ISBN 9780807142998. LCCN 2011039199. OCLC 804853731. Project MUSE book 16540.
- Bancroft, Frederic (2023) [1931, 1996]. Slave Trading in the Old South (Original publisher: J. H. Fürst Co., Baltimore). Southern Classics Series. Introduction by Michael Tadman (Reprint ed.). Columbia, S.C.: University of South Carolina Press. ISBN 978-1-64336-427-8. LCCN 95020493. OCLC 1153619151.
- Bedford, John R. (1919). "A Tour in 1807 Down the Cumberland, Ohio, and Mississippi Rivers from Nashville to New Orleans (Continued)". Tennessee Historical Magazine. 5 (2): 107–128. ISSN 2333-9012. JSTOR 42637417.
- Brown, John (1855). Chamerovzow, L. A (ed.). Slave Life in Georgia: A Narrative of the Life, Sufferings, and Escape of John Brown, a Fugitive Slave, Now in England. London: W. M. Watts. hdl:2027/coo.31924032774527. LCCN 13018452. OCLC 793886845 – via HathiTrust. – Also digitized by UNC's Documenting the American South Project
- Calderhead, William (1977). "The Role of the Professional Slave Trader in a Slave Economy: Austin Woolfolk, A Case Study". Civil War History. 23 (3): 195–211. doi:10.1353/cwh.1977.0041. ISSN 1533-6271. S2CID 143907436.
- Clark, T. D. (December 1934). "The Slave Trade between Kentucky and the Cotton Kingdom". The Mississippi Valley Historical Review. 21 (3). Urbana, Illinois: Mississippi Valley Historical Association: 331–342. doi:10.2307/1897378. ISSN 0161-391X. JSTOR 1897378. OCLC 35781793.
- Colby, Robert K. D. (2024). An Unholy Traffic: Slave Trading in the Civil War South. Oxford University Press. doi:10.1093/oso/9780197578261.001.0001. ISBN 9780197578285. LCCN 2023053721. OCLC 1412042395.
- Coleman, J. Winston (1940). Slavery Times in Kentucky. Chapel Hill, N.C.: University of North Carolina Press. LCCN 40031785. OCLC 387590.
- Coon, Diane Perrine (2009). "Slavery". In Claypool, James C.; Tenkotte, Paul A. (eds.). The Encyclopedia of Northern Kentucky. The University Press of Kentucky. pp. 834–836. ISBN 978-0-8131-2565-7. LCCN 2009027969. Project MUSE book 37469.
- Fitzpatrick, Benjamin Lewis (December 2008). Negroes for Sale: The Slave Trade in Antebellum Kentucky (Ph.D. thesis). University of Notre Dame. doi:10.7274/pn89d50750n.
- Hedrick, Charles Embury (1927). Social and Economic Aspects of Slavery in the Transmontane [West Virginia, Kentucky, Tennessee] Prior to 1850 (Ph.D. thesis). Contributions to Education No. 46. Nashville, Tennessee: George Peabody College for Teachers. OCLC 1415985132.
- James, Rev. Thomas (1886). Life of Rev. Thomas James, by Himself. Original held at Rochester Public Library. Rochester, N. Y.: Post Express Printing Company – via Documenting the American South, UNC Chapel Hill.
- Lucas, Marion B. (2014) [2003]. A History of Blacks in Kentucky: From Slavery to Segregation, 1760–1891 (2nd ed.). Frankfort: Kentucky Historical Society. ISBN 978-0-916968-32-8. LCCN 92024574. OCLC 1007290645. Project MUSE book 56781.
- McDougle, Ivan E. (1918). Slavery in Kentucky, 1792–1865. Library of Congress. Lancaster, Pennsylvania: Press of the New Era Printing Company.
- Mooney, Chase C. (1971) [1957]. "Chapter Two: Hire, Sale, Theft and Flight of Slaves". Slavery in Tennessee. Indiana University Publications, Social Science Series No. 17 (Reprint ed.). Westport, Connecticut: Negro Universities Press. pp. 29–63. ISBN 0837155223. LCCN 74138683. OCLC 609222448 – via HathiTrust.
- Pettus, Shirley Gill (1924). The Antecedents of the Civil War in Kentucky, 1848–1860 (M.A. thesis). University of Wisconsin. hdl:2027/wu.89089881957 – via HathiTrust.
- O'Brien, Mary Lawrence Bickett (2014) [2001]. "Slavery in Louisville 1820–1860". In Kleber, John E. (ed.). The Encyclopedia of Louisville. University Press of Kentucky. pp. 825–826. ISBN 978-0-8131-2100-0. LCCN 99053755. OCLC 900344482. Project MUSE book 37208.
- Perrin, William Henry, ed. (1884). Counties of Christian and Trigg, Kentucky, Historical and Biographical. Chicago and Louisville: F. A. Battey Publishing Co. p. 68. hdl:2027/chi.18154288. OCLC 919846047. OL 22973645M – via HathiTrust.
- Phillips, Ulrich Bonnell (1918). American Negro Slavery: A Survey of the Supply, Employment and Control of Negro Labor as Determined by the Plantation Régime. New York: D. Appleton and Company. LCCN 18011187. OCLC 654259743. OL 13992719M. – Also digitized by Project Gutenberg
- Schermerhorn, Calvin (2016). "Chapter 10. The Coastwise Slave Trade and a Mercantile Community of Interest". In Rockman, Seth Edward; Beckert, Sven (eds.). Slavery's Capitalism: A New History of American Economic Development. Early American Studies. Philadelphia: University of Pennsylvania Press. pp. 209–224. doi:10.9783/9780812293098-011. ISBN 978-0-8122-4841-8. JSTOR j.ctt1dfnrs7. LCCN 2016304619. OCLC 945028802.
- Stowe, Harriet Beecher (1853). A key to Uncle Tom's cabin: presenting the original facts and documents upon which the story is founded. Boston: J. P. Jewett & Co. LCCN 02004230. OCLC 317690900. OL 21879838M.
- Sydnor, Charles S. (1933). Slavery in Mississippi. American Historical Association, Carnegie Corporation of New York. New York: D. Appleton-Century Co. LCCN 33033678. OCLC 1968805.
- Townsend, William H. (2014) [1955]. Lincoln and the Bluegrass: Slavery and Civil War in Kentucky. Lexington: The University Press of Kentucky. ISBN 9780813148755. LCCN 55010383. OCLC 18982234. Project MUSE book 37140.

Weld, Theodore Dwight; Grimké, Angelina; Grimké, Sarah Moore (1839). "Testimony of the Rev. William T. Allan, Late of Alabama". American Slavery As It Is: Testimony of a Thousand Witnesses. American Anti-Slavery Society. New York: Published by the American Anti-Slavery Society, office, no. 143 Nassau Street. pp. 45–47. LCCN 11008377. OCLC 14906369. OL 20509019M. This article incorporates text from this source, which is in the public domain.

- Wilson, Brandon R. (2023). "Chapter I: Slave Incarceration at the Foundation of Kentucky Finance". In Smith, Gerald L. (ed.). Slavery and Freedom in the Bluegrass State: Revisiting My Old Kentucky Home. Lexington, Ky.: University Press of Kentucky. doi:10.2307/j.ctv32nxz6m.4. ISBN 978-0-8131-9616-9. JSTOR j.ctv32nxz6m.4.
