= Griffin & Pullum =

American slave-trading company

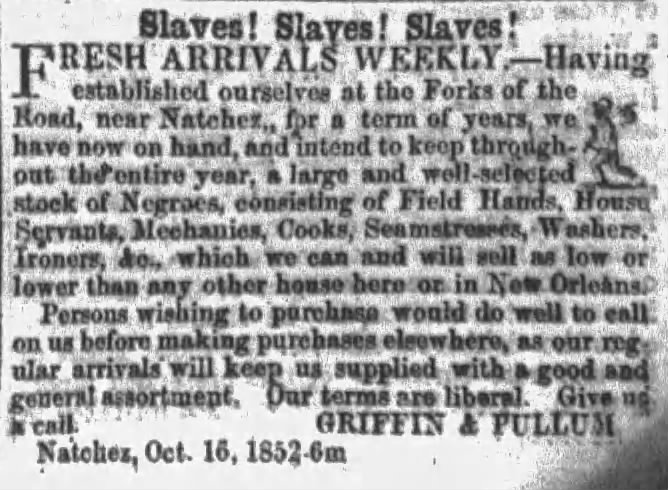
"Slaves! Slaves! Slaves!" Mississippi Free Trader, Natchez, Miss., Jan. 26, 1853

Griffin & Pullum, later Griffin, Pullum & Co., was a 19th-century American interstate slave-trading company. The principals were Pierce Griffin and William A. Pullum. They mainly bought people in Kentucky and sold them in Mississippi.

According to J. Winston Coleman in Slavery Times in Kentucky, Pierce Griffin was selling in Natchez as early as 1833, and "from the tax returns of that year, which represented one per cent of the gross sales of all 'transient merchants' and 'vendors of slaves,' it appears that Griffin sold over six thousand dollars' worth of slaves".

In May 1902, historian Frederic Bancroft interviewed a man named Alfred Wornell, who had been trafficked to Natchez from Lexington, Kentucky by Pullum, likely in the late 1840s. Wornell said:

Den Billy Pullum bought me. Him an' Pierce Griffin was niggah-tradahs, an' put me in his jail in Lexin'ton. Pullum brought me down t' Griffin's yahd at de Forks o' de Road...Sixty-three hade [head] of us walked. Dere was two wagons an' a amb 'lance. Here was only one little chile; de res' was men an' women. De oldes' man was 'bout 45 and de women 'bout 15 to 25. Dey give us meat an' bread an' coffee. Dere was plenty of it while we was comin'. We started 'fore day an' traveled till three o'clock in de ev'nin. We stopped some days to res' up...Fettahs was kep' on my ankles for a week er two 'cause I had run away."

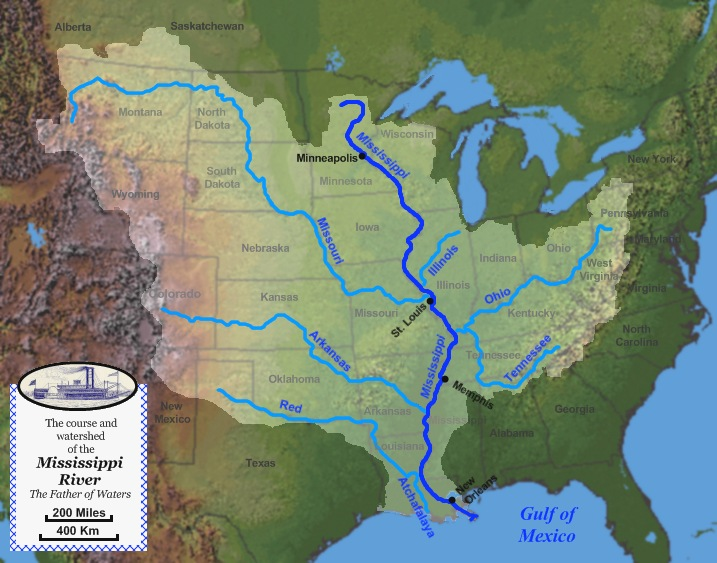
Slavery was only secure south of the Ohio River

Sometimes enslaved people trafficked by Griffin & Pullum were shipped south by steamboat, rather than being driven in coffles, in which case, per court testimony of an agent for Pullum, they were kept chained until the Ohio River became the Mississippi, in order to prevent the prisoners from jumping overboard and attempting to swim to safety in a free state.

Griffin & Pullum was part of the chain of slave traders who kidnapped and trafficked Henrietta Wood to Mississippi. Later in the 1850s, Griffin & Pullum became Griffin, Pullum & Co., with Asa Blackwell and F. G. Murphy representing the Co. Also in 1860 Griffin & Pullum advertised that they were selling out of the "old Elam House" at Forks of the Road slave market, meaning the former premises of R. H. Elam. According to historian Steven Deyle, "...newspaper editors in the Lower South helped to promote the [internal slave] trade by occasionally running news stories praising the services of local traders or announcing upcoming sales...In Natchez, the Mississippi Free Trader informed its readers that the firm of Griffin & Pullum had a new lot of slaves for sale, adding that 'this is an old established firm known far and near for the probity that has always marked their every transaction.'"

== See also ==
- Coffle
- List of American slave traders
