= Neal McCann =

American slave trader (1800–1866)

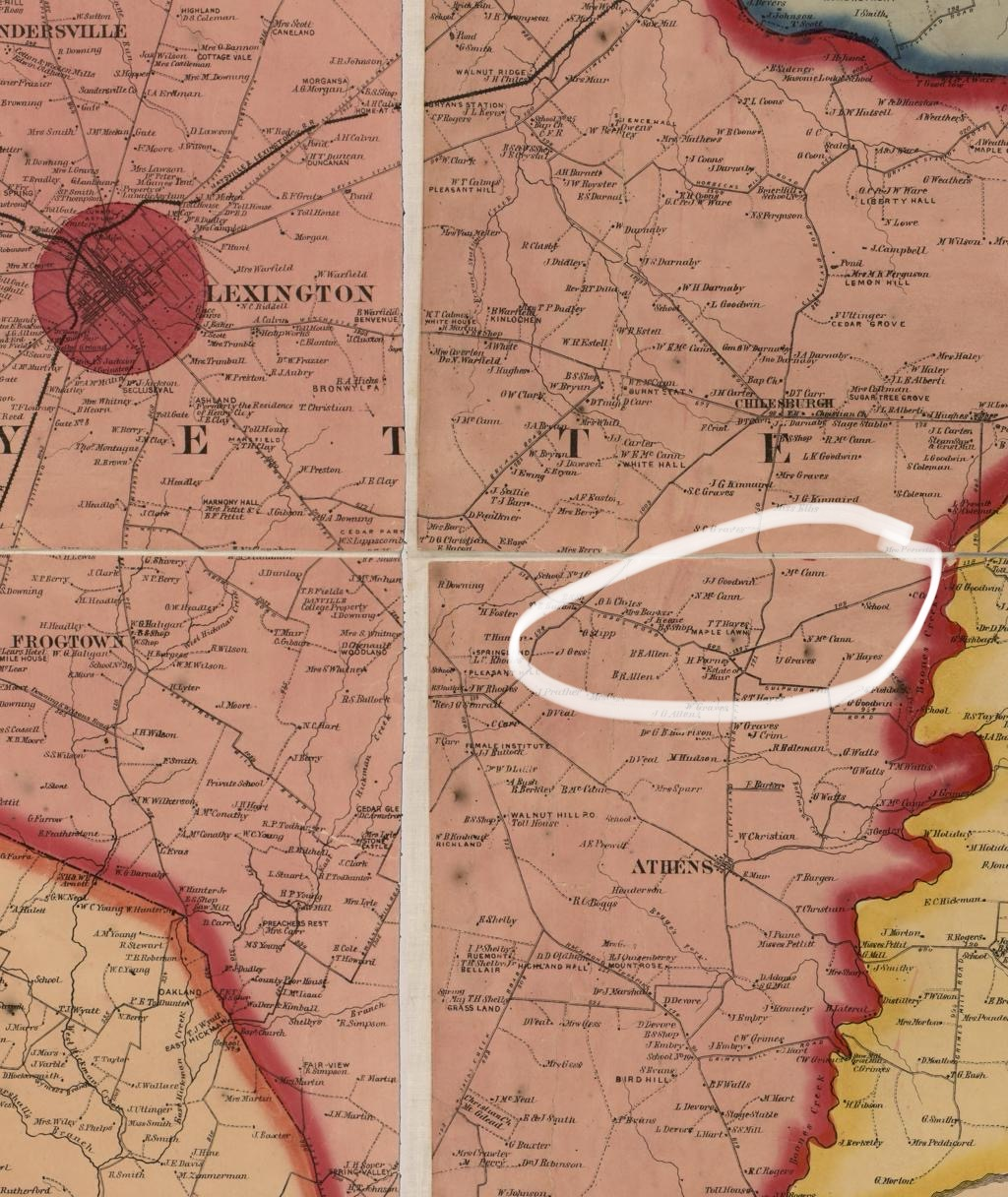
- McCann property in Fayette County, Kentucky, 1861
- Born: 1800; Kentucky, United States
- Died: January 30, 1866; Near Lexington, Kentucky, United States

Neal McCann (1800 – January 30, 1866), sometimes referred to in print as Col. McCann, was a 19th-century American state legislator, farmer, stockman, slave owner, and slave trader based in Lexington, Kentucky, United States. He would have been familiar with the Todd family of Lexington that produced Mary Todd Lincoln, as he lived on Todds road, endorsed a boarding school operated by a Hugh Todd, sold dry goods for a Richard B. Todd, and served in the legislature in 1841 representing Fayette County along with Abraham Lincoln's father-in-law, Robert Smith Todd.

== Biography ==
McCann was most likely properly "Neal McCann III" as both Neal McCann Sr. and Neal McCann Jr. were tax-paying residents of Fayette County around the time the youngest McCann was born in 1800. The McCann farm may have been known as Woodstock. McCann's father or grandfather may have been some kind of tailor or haberdasher, as in 1801 he advertised in the newspaper for apprentices to "learn the hat making business, and also, one penny reward each for William Emberson and Samuel Hardister, who ran away last January, if delivered to him in Lexington."

Little is known of McCann's early life or education. He was politically a Whig, appearing as a delegate at a Whig convention in 1834. In 1836 Hugh B. Todd listed McCann as a reference for his boarding school for young ladies in Lexington. By 1839 he had come to be a colonel in the local militia. That same year he was a member of the Transylvania Institute. He sold dry goods, including bolts of fabric, at auction in 1840 on behalf of Richard B. Todd.

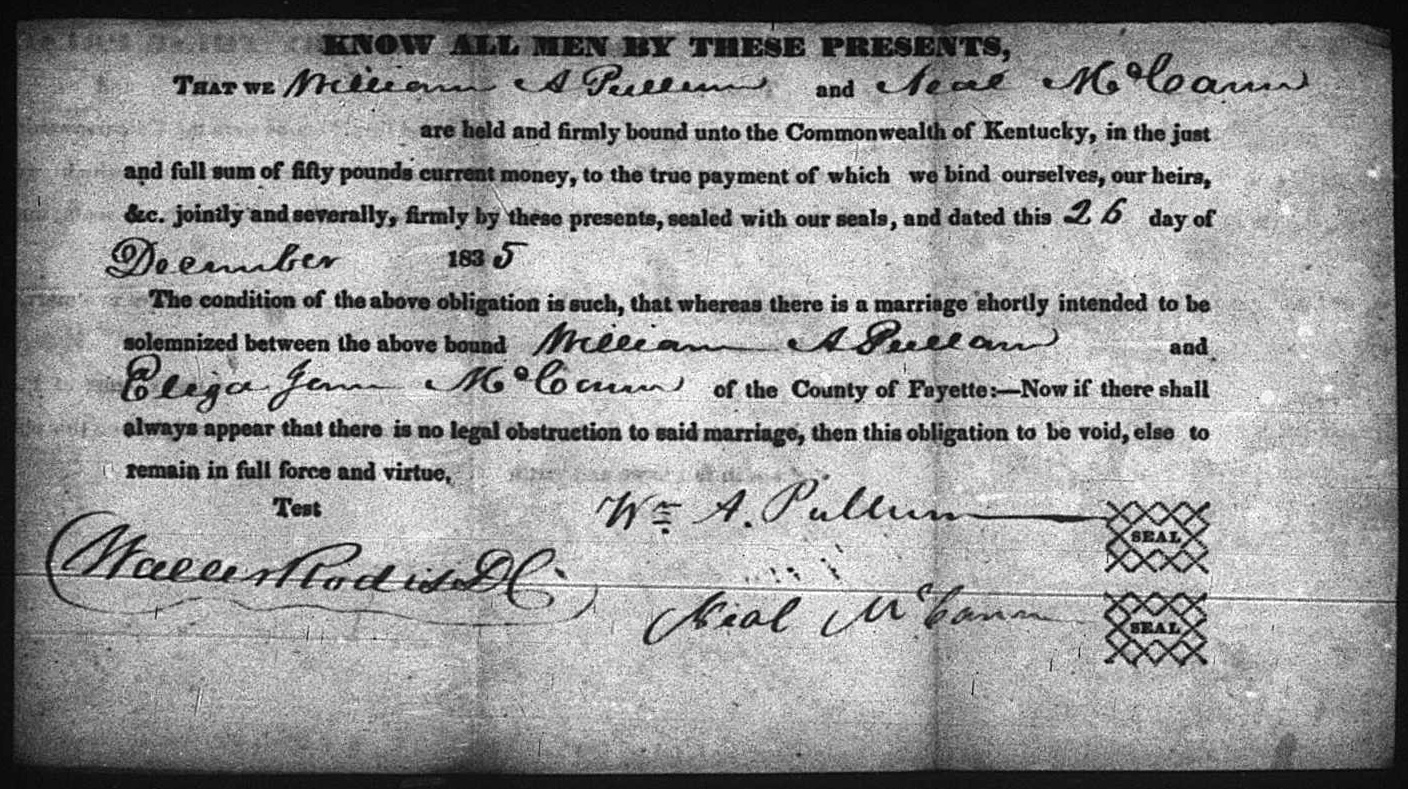
Neal McCann signed the 1835 marriage license for William A. Pullum and his daughter Eliza Jane Mccann

In April 1841 McCann announced his candidacy for the Kentucky House of Representatives. The other candidates that year were Cassius M. Clay, G. W. C. Graves, James L. Hickman, Robert S. Todd, Robert Wickliffe Jr., and Owen W. Winn. He was a single-term Kentucky state assembly member, representing Lexington in 1841 alongside Robert S. Todd, who became father-in-law to Abraham Lincoln in 1842.

In June 1842 he was one of the organizers of a Grand Barbecue for Henry Clay.

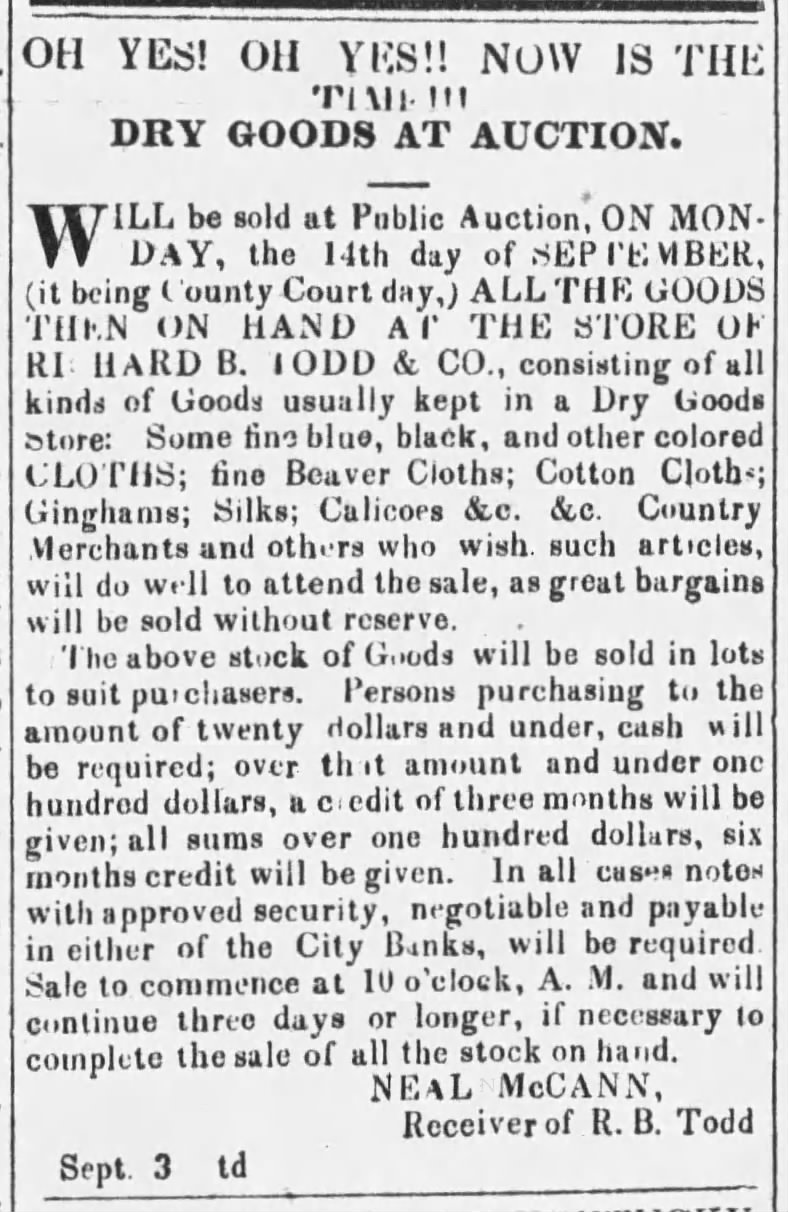
Neal McCann, receiver of R. B. Todd, "Dry Goods at Auction" Kentucky Gazette, September 10, 1840

In 1847 McCann advertised for the recovery of an enslaved man "named Ned, about 25 years old." McCann donated $20 to the American Colonization Society in 1848. In 1849 he was one of the commissioners for a planned Chilesburg and Athens Turnpike Road to Lexington.

At the time of the 1850 census he was the legal owner of four Black (as opposed to Mulatto) male slaves, aged 55, 52, 65, and 40. Also in his household in 1850 was his widowed son-in-law, the slave trader William A. Pullum, and his two young Pullum grandsons, and another "trader" named George W. Hall. McCann was a slave trader as well but very little is known about his business. (Note: In 1853, when Harriet Beecher Stowe published the polemical non-fiction A Key to Uncle Tom's Cabin, she included a letter from Lewis Hayden, who had been enslaved in Lexington until 1845. He wrote, "I never knew a slave-trader that did not seem to think, in his heart, that the trade was a bad one. I knew a great many of them, such as Neal, McAnn, Cobb, Stone, Pulliam, and Davis, &c. They were like Haley,—they meant to repent when they got through." There appears to be little scholarship on this list but Cobb may be Lexington slave trader David Cobb, Stone may be Lexington slave trader Ned Stone, and "Neal, McAnn" could be Neal McCann.)

In 1854 McCann was a commissioner of the Kentucky, Cumberland Gap, and Southern Railroad Company, in 1858 McCann was a director of the Lexington and Danville Railroad. In 1859 McCann purchased $5,100 in yearling mules from Thompson B. Field. In 1860 Neal McCann appeared to be a model of diversified farming in the Bluegrass region of Kentucky. He reported that he owned a Fayette County farm of 1100 acres with "40 horses, 140 asses and mules, 21 milch cows, 6 oxen, 60 other cattle, 40 sheep, and 50 swine. His crops consisted of 1,400 bushels of wheat, 250 bushels of rye, 3,500 bushels of corn, 1,800 bushels of oats, 35 pounds of wool, 2,000 pounds of butter, 25 tons of hay, and 15 tons of hemp." In 1861 he was the judge for mules on day two of the Bourbon County Agricultural Society.

During Confederate General John Hunt Morgan's horse-stealing raids in 1862, after burning a railroad bridge near Lexington, Morgan and his troops "next went toward Winchester, stealing all the good horses as they passed, and stayed at the farm of Neal McCann, who has a son and nephew with them." In July 1864, the Tri-Weekly Commonwealth of Frankfort, Kentucky reported, "We understand that Neal McCann of Fayette county and four of Jno. H. Morgan's marauders, who he was hiding on his premises were arrested and placed in prison at Lexington, on the 29th June."

McCann died in Lexington, Kentucky in January 1866.

== 1849: Murder of Joseph Lyon ==
In 1849 a man named Joseph Lyon was killed on or near McCann's property. At the time of his disappearance he was described as a "young man who has been living for a number of years in the family of Col. Neal McCann." He disappeared on Sunday, September 9, 1849. McCann and Lyon's brother Thomas Lyon offered a reward and the newspaper reported "fears are entertained that he has been murdered." According to the New Orleans Crescent, the reward was $1,000, and Lyons "had been an inmate of the family for 15 years. He retired to his room with a newly lighted candle at about 8 o'clock, P. M., and has never been seen since that time. The bed was found still made up, the candle had not burned long, his hat had not been taken, and his horse was found lame, having lost saddle and bridle, six miles off. It is suspected that he was murdered."

Lyon's body was found on September 19 in an advanced state of decomposition "on the premises of Mr. Thomas Hays, and about four or five hundred yards from Col. McCann's house." It was thought that he had been attacked in order to rob him of a "considerable sum of money" and "several negroes" had been arrested on suspicion of involvement. On October 11, friends of McCann published a card that discredited "rumors that he was connected with the murder of Joseph Lyon," stating that he was "altogether incapable of this or any other crime." On October 31 the Natchez Mississippi Free Trader reported that two enslaved men who had been arrested had confessed to the crime. According to the reporting of the Free Trader, Lyon was targeted because he was thought to be carrying $1,800 in cash for purchasing cattle somewhere on Green River, but he returned to without the cattle and returned the money to McCann. Supposedly the slaves had killed Lyon for the money (which he turned out not to have), put his body on his horse, and led it about "two miles and buried the body in a cornfield."

Four enslaved men, Dudley, Henry, Anthony, and Gabriel, were convicted and sentenced to death for the murders, in part based on the testimony of Lewis, who had been legally enslaved by McCann.

== McCann House ==
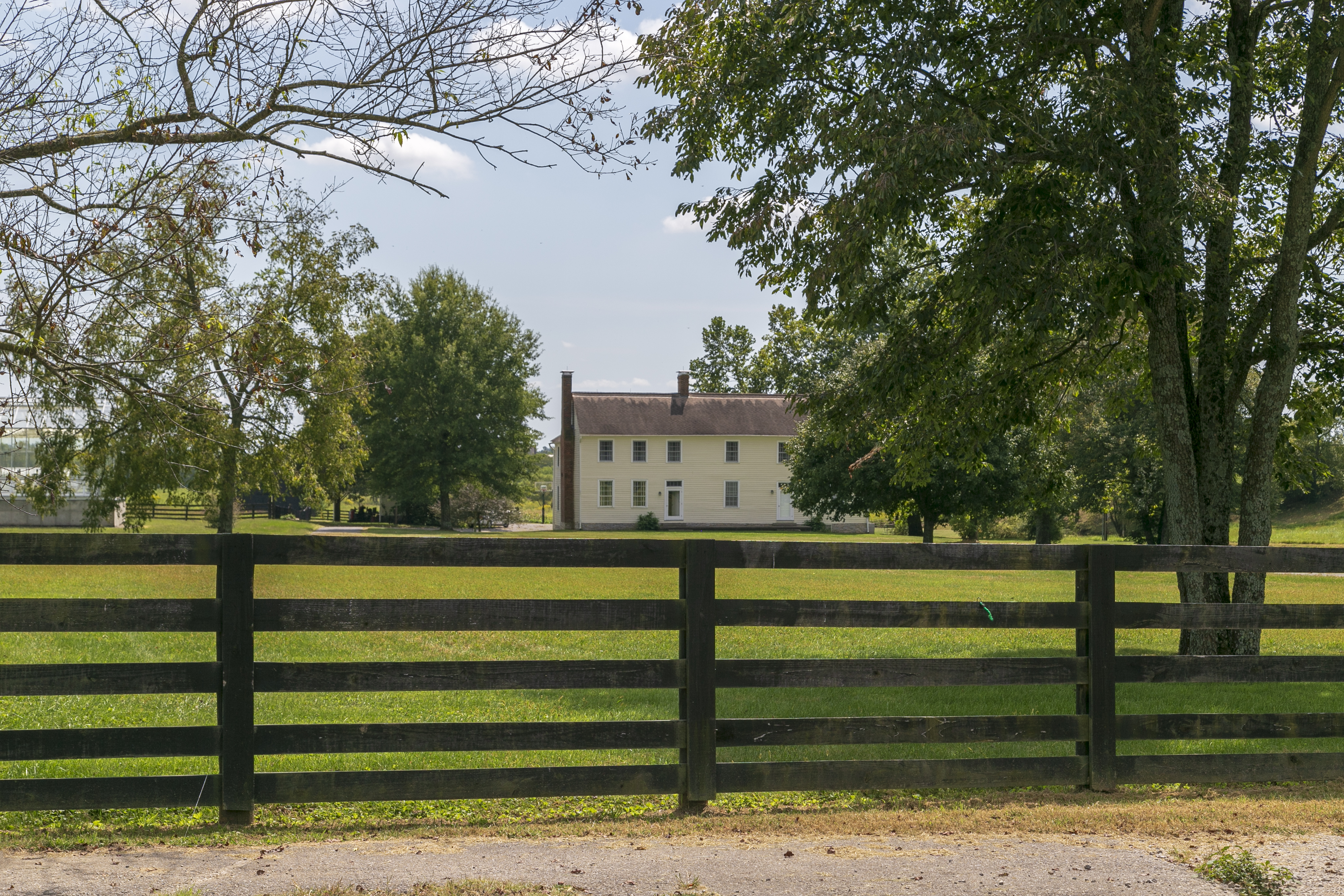
Neal McCann House — Fayette County, Kentucky

Construction on what became known as the McCann House on the south side of Todds Road, southeast of Lexington, started around 1797. The original house had three rooms, later used as dining room, parlor, and hall. A detached brick-built kitchen was constructed in the first quarter of the 1800s, and stood about 30 feet back from the house. The two buildings were likely connected into one larger house in the 1840s. The McCann House has been added to the National Register of Historic Places.

== See also ==
- List of Kentucky slave traders
- History of slavery in Kentucky
- National Register of Historic Places listings in Fayette County, Kentucky
- Timeline of Lexington, Kentucky

== Sources ==
- Astor, Aaron (2012). Rebels on the Border: Civil War, Emancipation, and the Reconstruction of Kentucky and Missouri. Conflicting Worlds: New Dimensions of the American Civil War. Baton Rouge: Louisiana State University Press. ISBN 9780807142998. LCCN 2011039199. OCLC 804853731. Project MUSE book 16540.
- Coleman, J. Winston (1940). Slavery Times in Kentucky. Chapel Hill, N.C.: University of North Carolina Press. LCCN 40031785. OCLC 387590.
- DeCamp, Richard (April 1982). "McCann House". National Register of Historic Places. Lexington–Fayette County Historic Commission. U.S. National Park Service.
- Hopkins, James F. (2014) [1951]. A History of the Hemp Industry in Kentucky. Lexington: The University Press of Kentucky. ISBN 9780813148618. Project MUSE book 37023.
- Lancaster, Clay (2014) [1991]. Antebellum Architecture of Kentucky. Lexington: The University Press of Kentucky. ISBN 9780813161686. LCCN 91002419. OCLC 900464435. Project MUSE book 41020.
- Ranck, George Washington (1872). History of Lexington, Kentucky: its early annals and recent progress, including biographical sketches and personal reminiscences of the pioneer settlers, notices of prominent citizens, etc., etc. Heritage classic. Cincinnati: Robert Clarke. LCCN rc01002646. OL 13797766W.
- Staples, Charles R. (2014) [1939]. The History of Pioneer Lexington, 1779–1806. Lexington: The University Press of Kentucky. ISBN 9780813159614. OCLC 605162963. Project MUSE book 37694.
- Stowe, Harriet Beecher (1853). A key to Uncle Tom's cabin: presenting the original facts and documents upon which the story is founded. Boston: J. P. Jewett & Co. LCCN 02004230. OCLC 317690900. OL 21879838M.
- Townsend, William H. (2014) [1955]. Lincoln and the Bluegrass: Slavery and Civil War in Kentucky. Lexington: The University Press of Kentucky. ISBN 9780813148755. LCCN 55010383. OCLC 18982234. Project MUSE book 37140.
- Turner, Wallace B. (1960). "Kentucky Slavery in the Last Ante Bellum Decade". The Register of the Kentucky Historical Society. 58 (4): 291–307. ISSN 0023-0243. JSTOR 23374678.
