= List of Texas slave traders =

This is a list of slave traders operating within the present-day boundaries of Texas before 1865, including the eras of Spanish Texas (before 1821), Mexican Texas (1821–1836), the Republic of Texas (1836–1846), and antebellum era and Confederate Texas (1846–1865).

- Tom Banks, Richmond and Texas
- Daniel Berry, Tennessee and Texas
- James Bowie, Galveston
- John Bowie, Galveston
- Rezin Bowie, Galveston
- Louis de Aury, Galveston
- Manuel de Herrera, Galveston
- Monroe Edwards, San Leon County and Africa
- James Walker Fannin, Texas and Cuba
- Louis de Aury, Galveston
- Manuel de Herrera, Galveston
- Galbert, Texas
- Jose Gamden, Texas and Tennessee
- Pierre Lafitte and Jean Lafitte
- Thomas McKinney, Quintana and Galveston
- Leander McNeil, Brazos River and Africa
- Plesant McNeil, Brazos River and Africa
- Sterling McNeil, Brazos River and Africa
- Xavier Mina, Galveston
- Moro and Coigly, Sabine River
- C. M. Rutherford, New Orleans and Houston
- Benjamin Fort Smith, Brazos River and Africa
- James Vanclevy, Charleston and Texas
- Vanhook, Tennessee
- Henry Vanhusen, Mississippi and Texas

== See also ==
- List of slave traders of the United States
- History of slavery in Texas
- List of Alabama slave traders
- List of District of Columbia slave traders
- List of Georgia and Florida slave traders
- List of Kentucky slave traders
- List of Maryland and Delaware slave traders
- List of Missouri slave traders
- List of Tennessee slave traders
- Family separation in American slavery
- List of largest slave sales in the United States
- Movement to reopen the transatlantic slave trade
- Kidnapping into slavery in the United States
- Bibliography of the slave trade in the United States
- Slave markets and slave jails in the United States

== Sources ==
- Robbins, Fred (October 1971). "The Origin and Development of the African Slave Trade in Galveston, Texas, and Surrounding Areas from 1816 to 1836". East Texas Historical Journal. 9 (2). ISSN 0424-1444.
