= David Cobb (slave trader) =

American slave trader (d. 1826)

David Cobb (b. between 1776 and 1794 – d. September 17, 1826) was an early 19th-century American slave trader and tobacco merchant who worked in Lexington and lived in central Kentucky. He was killed, along with Edward Stone, Howard Stone and two others, in the 1826 Ohio River slave rebellion, by slaves they were transporting south for resale. According to Benjamin Lundy's Genius of Universal Emancipation the slaves had "been brought it is said from Maryland."

== Biography ==
The Alabama Department of Archives and History holds two bills of sale for people trafficked by Cobb: Cobb sold Primas and Mille in 1807 (or 1801), and bought Claiborn in Huntsville, Alabama Territory, in 1818.

There was a letter waiting for Cobb at the Lexington, Kentucky post office in January 1816. Cobb and Nancy Dudgeon were married in Green County, Kentucky on August 15, 1816. Cobb was enumerated in the 1820 U.S. census as a resident of Lexington, Fayette County, Kentucky, as a free white man aged 26 to 44, along with a woman in the same age cohort and a free white male between 10 and 15 years old. In 1823, David Cobb, Daniel Bradford, and James Kelly were tenants of a building located on the north west corner of Short and Upper streets in Lexington, Kentucky. The same year there was a planned court sale of a property on Upper street that had been used as a "tobacco factory" by David Cobb.

Cobb was based in Lexington at the time of his death in 1826, and in spring of that year had been tenant of a brick house with a lot located on Constitution Street. Cobb's estate, as inventoried in March and April 1827 in Green County, Kentucky, included a cow and a steer, two sows and pigs, four chairs, one trunk, one table, one yearling, 550 lbs of tobacco, and one hogshead of tobacco neat. Cobb's son Benjamin died in the 1833 cholera outbreak in Lexington.

== Legacy ==
At the time of his murder, a newspaper in Rhode Island stated that "One of the individuals, who fell a victim to the fury of the slaves, as above recited, [Cobb] is a man who has for many years been engaged in the slave trade; and he possessed a heart so callous to all the feelings of our natures, that it is almost incredible to suppose that the pointed steel could reach its centre. He lived a life of iniquity—was a barbarian in principle, and humanity rejoices that 'the waves are upon him.'"

Abolitionist Lewis Hayden, who had escaped from slavery in Lexington, Kentucky, wrote to Harriet Beecher Stowe about the slave trade that, "I knew a great many of them, such as Neal, McAnn, Cobb, Stone, Pulliam, and Davis, &c. They were like Haley, they meant to repent when they got through."

== See also ==
- List of Kentucky slave traders
- History of slavery in Kentucky
