= Ohio River slave rebellion =

1826 rebellion by enslaved people

Enslaved people in transit on the Ohio River staged a slave rebellion in Breckinridge County, Kentucky, (Note: Apthecker says the rebellion took place 90 miles downriver from Louisville, Kentucky; Harrold says 100 miles; while Smardz Frost identifies Stephensport, Kentucky, as the site of the rebellion.) on September 17, 1826. It was the bloodiest recorded rebellion by enslaved people in Kentucky before the American Civil War.

Slave traders Howard and Edward Stone, David Cobb, and Humphrey David (or Davis) left Maysville, Kentucky, with one white passenger and between 75 and 77 Black captives bound for the Natchez slave market. (Note: Aptheker claims 77 enslaved captives, Smardz Frost says 75, and Harrold says 75 or 76.) Traveling down the Ohio by flatboat, some of the captives managed to free themselves after four days on the river. "Armed with clubs, axes, and knives," they killed their captors and the sole white passenger after a struggle and sank their bodies in the river. The rebels piloted the boat to the northern bank and sank the craft off the Indiana shore. Equipped with money taken from the wreck, they split into groups and headed north. The larger group of 56 freedom seekers was overtaken near Rome, Indiana, where they had sheltered overnight. Most of the freedom seekers in the second group were later captured and returned to Kentucky.

The captives were taken to Hardinsburg, Kentucky, and lodged in the Breckinridge County jail. Twelve prisoners were indicted for the murders of the Stones, Cobb, and Davis, and tried on November 20. Seven defendants were acquitted, while five were convicted and subsequently executed by hanging on November 29, 1826. Edward Stone's enslaved valet reportedly defended his enslaver during the rebellion and was later manumitted by Stone's widow. Those acquitted were transported for sale to the Deep South along with 38 others, while the remainder went to Paris, Kentucky.

== See also ==
- History of slavery in Kentucky
- Slave rebellion and resistance in the United States

== Bibliography ==
- Aptheker, Herbert (1963). American Negro Slave Revolts. New York: International Publishers.
- Smardz Frost, Karolyn (2007). I've Got a Home in Glory Land: A Lost Tale of the Underground Railroad. Toronto: Thomas Allen Publishers.
- Harrold, Stanley (2010). Border War: Fighting over Slavery before the Civil War. Chapel Hill: University of North Carolina Press.
