= William A. Pullum =

American slave trader (~1809–1876)

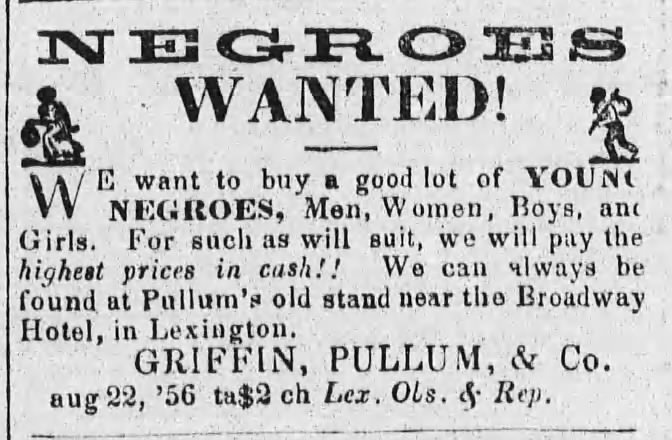
- "Negroes Wanted!" The Kentucky Tribune, August 22, 1856
- Born: c. 1809; Kentucky, U.S.
- Died: March 25, 1876; Missouri, U.S.
- Other names: Pullium, Pulliam
- Occupation: Slave trader

William A. Pullum (c. 1809 – March 25, 1876) was a 19th-century American slave trader, and a principal of Griffin & Pullum. He was based in Lexington, Kentucky, and for many years purchased, imprisoned, and shipped enslaved people from Virginia and Kentucky south to the Forks-of-the-Road slave market in Natchez, Mississippi.

== Biography ==
Pullum was born about 1810 in Kentucky. He was said to be one of the "early residents" of Fayette County, Kentucky. According to a news report from 1904, in the 1830s Pullum bought a house in Lexington that had been designed by architect Mathias Shryock as his personal residence in 1809. Pullum married Eliza Jane McCann in Fayette County in December 1835. Eliza Jane McCann's father, Neal McCann, was also a slave trader. It is unknown when Pullum entered the slave trade in the United States but he had letters waiting for him at the Natchez, Mississippi post office in 1833 and 1837. Pullum added on to the former Shryock property, building "in the rear of this residence and fronting on Sycamore street...a large and substantial brick house which he used as a slave prison."

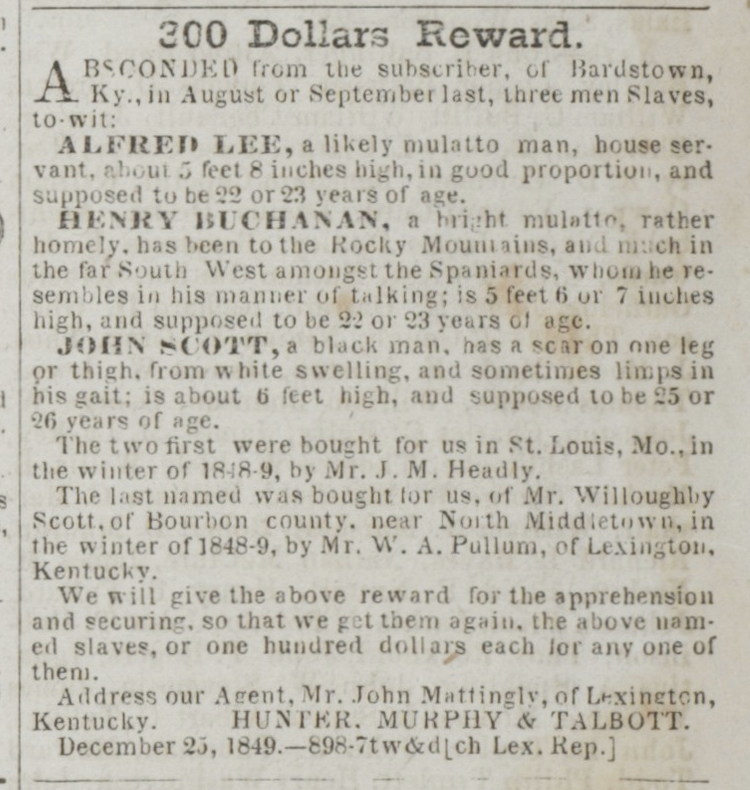
William A. Pullum bought John Scott near North Middletown, Bourbon County in the winter of 1848–1849 and sold him to Hunter, Murphy & Talbott (Frankfort Daily Commonwealth, Jan. 1, 1850)

In 1848, Pullum advertised in a Lexington newspaper that he wanted "BLACKS—50 Likely Young Negroes wanted to purchase. Inquire of W. A. Pullum, near the Bruen House." In May 1902, historian Frederic Bancroft interviewed a man named Alfred Wornell, who had been trafficked to Natchez from Lexington by Pullum, likely in the late 1840s. Wornell said:

Den Billy Pullum bought me. Him an' Pierce Griffin was niggah-tradahs, an' put me in his jail in Lexin'ton. Pullum brought me down t' Griffin's yahd at de Forks o' de Road...Sixty-three hade [head] of us walked. Dere was two wagons an' a amb 'lance. Here was only one little chile; de res' was men an' women. De oldes' man was 'bout 45 and de women 'bout 15 to 25. Dey give us meat an' bread an' coffee. Dere was plenty of it while we was comin'. We started 'fore day an' traveled till three o'clock in de ev'nin. We stopped some days to res' up...Fettahs was kep' on my ankles for a week er two 'cause I had run away."

Sometimes enslaved people trafficked by Pullum were shipped south by steamboat, rather than being driven in coffles, in which case, per court testimony of an agent for Pullum, they were kept chained until the Ohio River became the Mississippi, in order to prevent the prisoners from jumping overboard and attempting to swim to safety in a free state.

Pullum owned a slave jail in Lexington that was leased by Lewis C. Robards in the late 1840s. According to J. Winston Coleman in Slavery Times in Kentucky (1940), Pullum "gave notice that, on account of ill health, he had leased out his 'old stand' near the Bruen House, which faced Broadway with the slave 'coops' fronting on Mechanics Alley. To all of his old friends and customers, Pullum warmly recommended his new lessee." In the 1850s, a kidnapped free woman of color Henrietta Woods was held in a slave jail on Broadway in Lexington that was said to be owned by Pullum. In her legal filings, she described the cell block as wet and rat-infested. Her individual cell was seven by eight, had a barred door, and had one small window close to the ceiling.

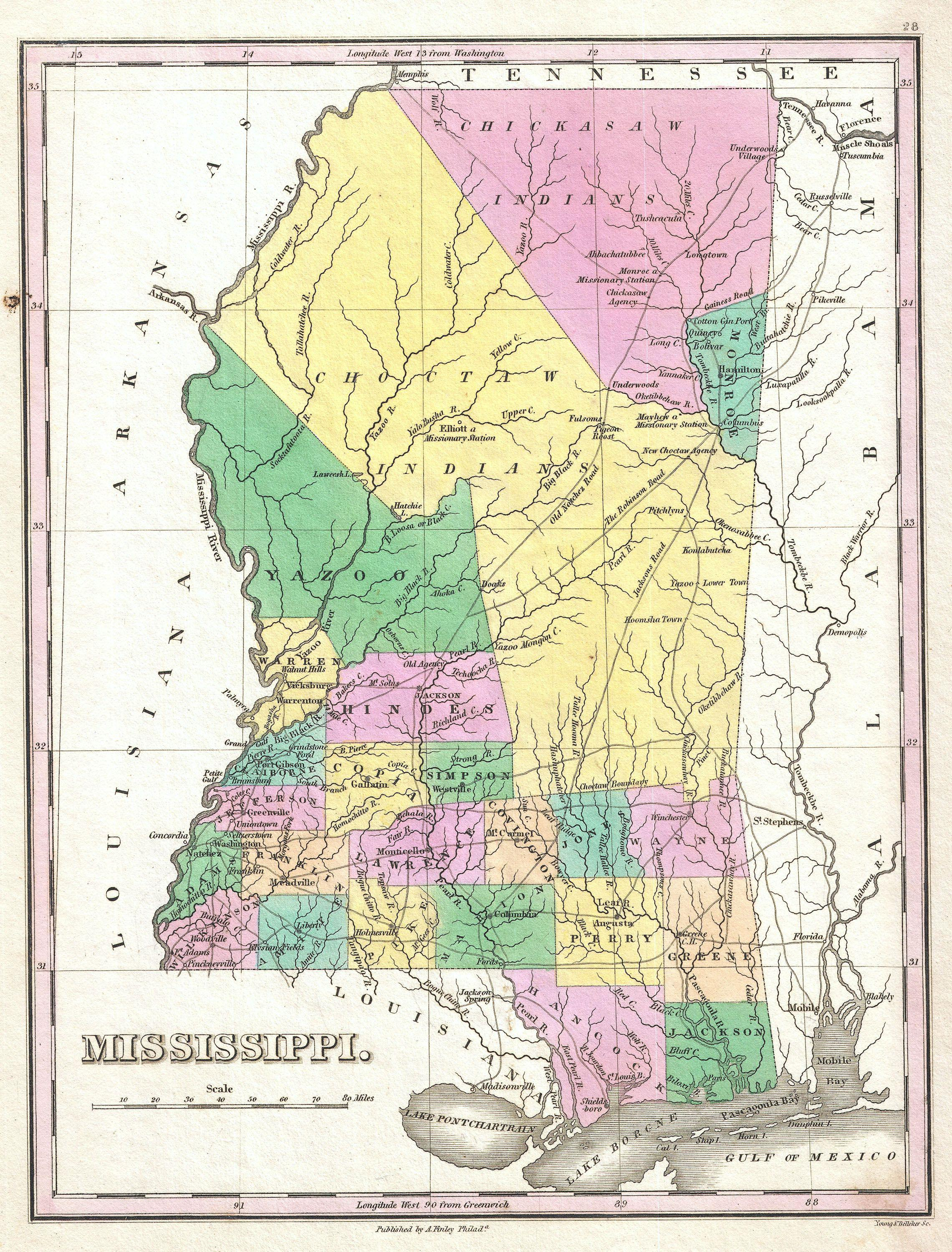
1827 map of Mississippi showing lands seized from Choctaw and the Chickasaw, and the Natchez Trace overland route by which coffles could be driven from the Upper South (Geographicus Rare Antique Maps)

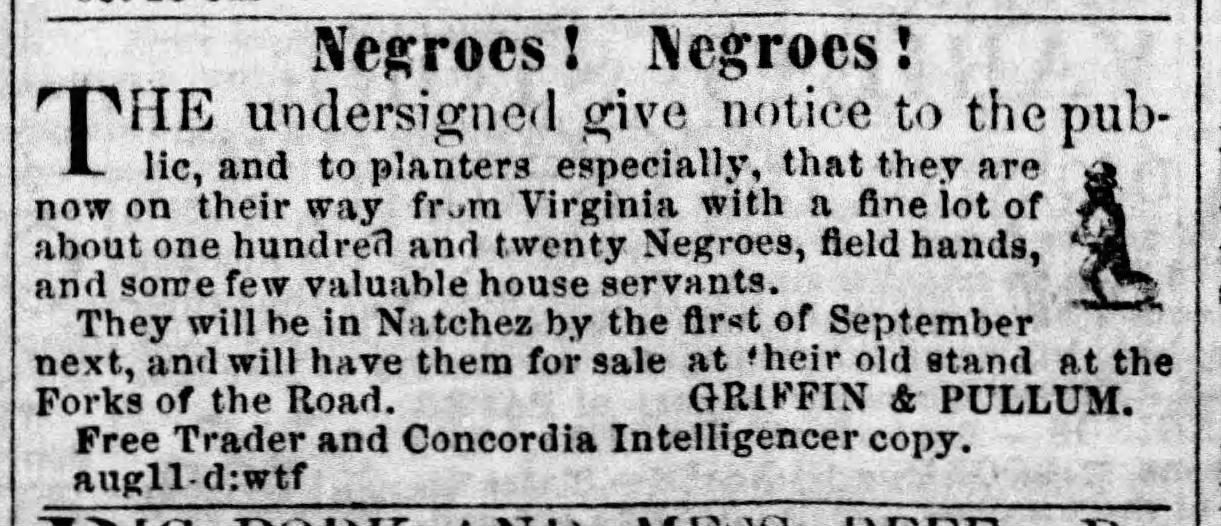
Griffin & Pullum advertisement "Negroes! Negroes!" Natchez Daily Courier, November 11, 1853

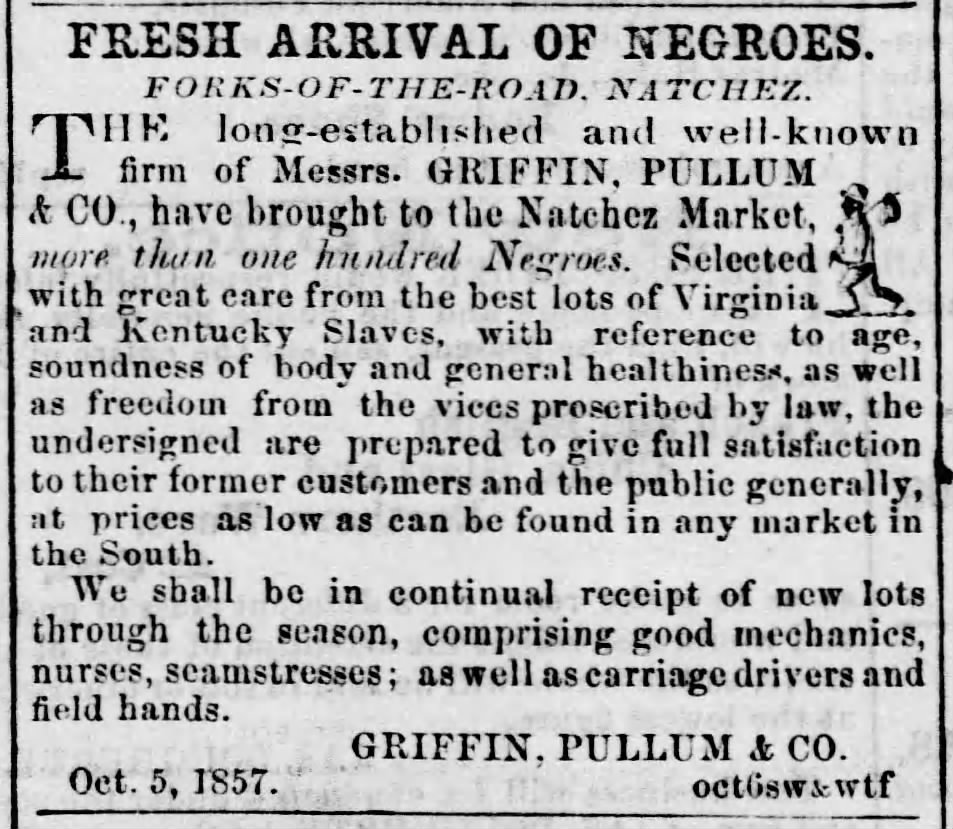
Griffin, Pullum & Co. advertisement "Fresh Arrival of Negroes" Mississippi Free Trader, November 4, 1857

At the time of the 1850 census Pullum was living in the household of his in-laws, occupation "none." He owned real estate valued at US$6,000 (equivalent to $232,200 in 2025). The occupation of one of the other members of the household was "trader."

In October 1852, Griffin & Pullum announced in the Natchez Daily Courier newspaper that they had "established themselves at the Forks of the road, Natchez, where they intend establishing a permanent Slave Depot. They have servants of all kinds for sale." Four months later, a follow up announced: "Slaves! Slaves! Slaves! FRESH ARRIVALS WEEKLY. Having established ourselves at the Forks of the Road, near Natchez, for a term of years, we have now on hand and intend to keep throughout the entire year, a large and well-selected stock of Negroes, consisting of field-hands, house servants, mechanics, cooks, seamstresses, washers, ironers, which we can and sell as low or lower than any other house here or in New Orleans. Persons wishing to purchase, would do well to call on us before making purchases elsewhere, as our regular arrivals will keep us supplied with good and general assortment. Our terms are liberal. Give us a call." In October 1853, 41-year-old Pullum remarried in Fayette County, following the death of his first wife, Emma Shrewsbury, age 21. Pullum testified in an 1853 deposition that in the 1840s, the expected profit for traders selling people down the river was about $100 to $150, or about $3,000 or $4,000 per person in 2023 money. Later in the 1850s, Griffin & Pullum became Griffin, Pullum & Co., with Asa Blackwell and F. G. Murphy representing the Co.

In 1858, a newspaper in Frankfort, Kentucky reported "Lexington is once again infested with incendiaries. Several stables have been set on fire within the last few days, and one owned by W. A. Pullum was totally destroyed."

In 1866, property in Desha County, Arkansas titled to William A. and Emma Pullum was auctioned to pay a debt. At the time of the 1870 census, Pullum lived in Springfield, Missouri. He worked as a retail grocer, and the value of his personal estate was US$1,000 (equivalent to $25,461 in 2025). His wife was proprietress of a boarding house called Kentucky House, which was located on Olive Street 50 yd (46 m) north of the courthouse. She placed a newspaper advertisement seeking "day, transient and week boarders."

== In popular culture ==
Pullum appears as a character in Milton Meltzer's Underground Man, a juvenile historical fiction book set in the border states before the American Civil War.

== See also ==
- List of American slave traders
- History of slavery in Kentucky
- History of slavery in Mississippi
