= Movement to reopen the transatlantic slave trade to the United States =

U.S. political campaign, 1850s

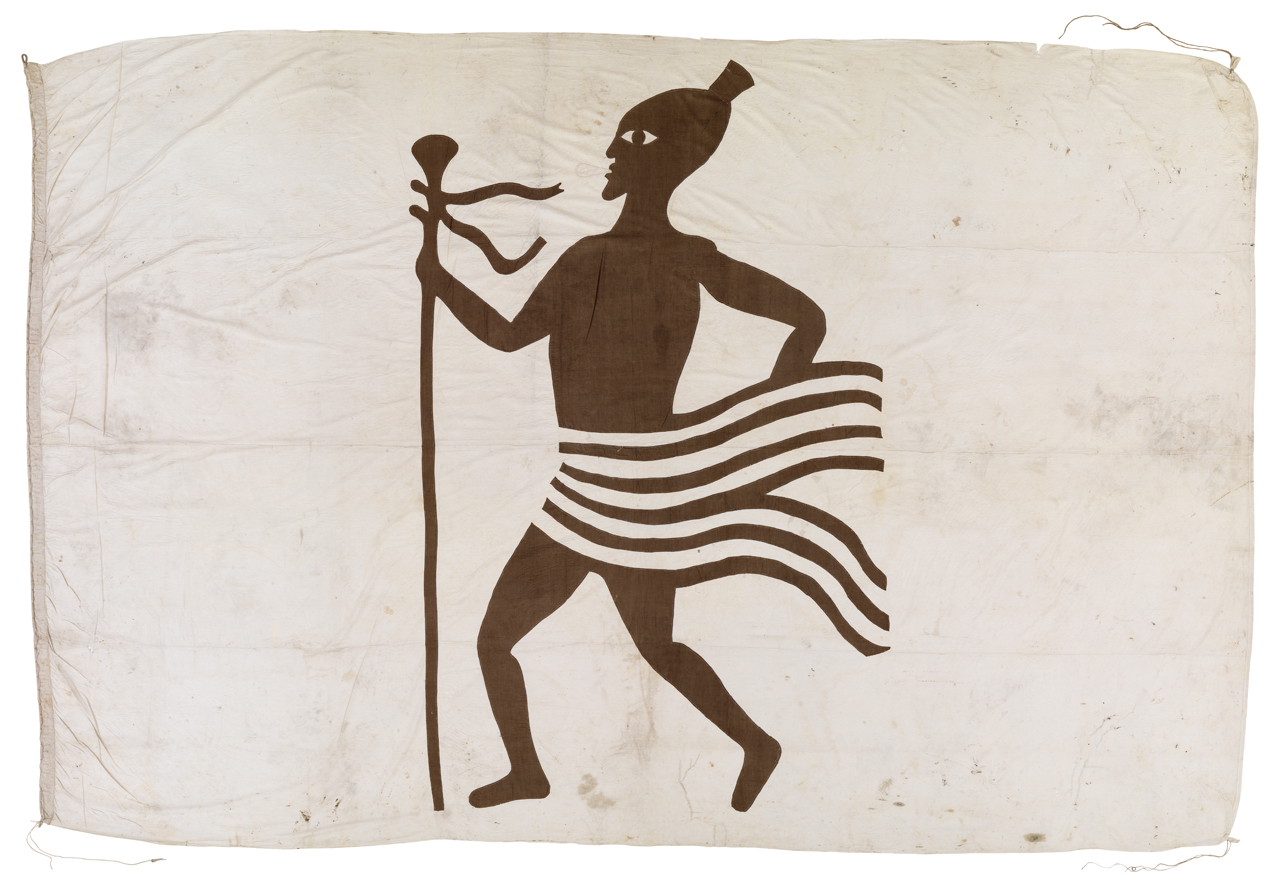
Even though the U.S. was no longer legally receiving transatlantic or transcaribbean slave ships after 1808, the trade continued to Brazil and Cuba; the British Royal Navy captured this slave trader's flag in the 1860s

The movement to reopen the transatlantic slave trade was an 1850s American campaign by white Southerners, many of them future Confederates, to repeal the 1808 Act Prohibiting Importation of Slaves and restart the transatlantic slave trade. Due to their foundational role in the Southern economy, and in part due to rampant speculation, slaves had become very expensive. Advocates for restarting slave imports hoped to drive down prices by increasing supply, making slave ownership more accessible to those outside the planter class, and making individual slaves cheaper and more disposable, in the hopes that it would secure the political future of slavery in the United States.

== History ==
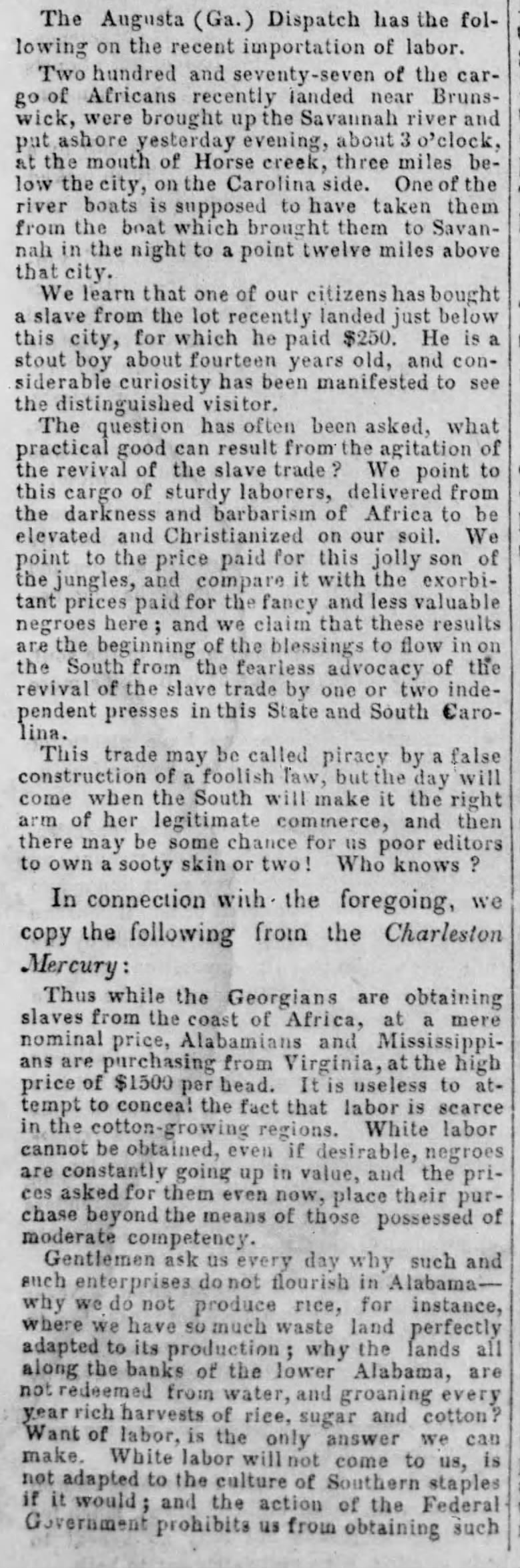
Newspaper editorials in response to the capture of the Wanderer

The movement was widespread and growing throughout the decade. The 1808 law was "denounced in vehement terms" throughout the South, and called the "fruit of 'a diseased sentimentality' [and a] 'canting philanthropy.'" For example, in 1854 a Williamsburg County, South Carolina, grand jury reported, "As our unanimous opinion, that the Federal law abolishing the African Slave Trade is a public grievance. We hold this trade has been and would be, if reestablished, a blessing to the American people and a benefit to the African himself." The Southern Commercial Convention met at Montgomery, Alabama, in 1858 to debate the issue. As one speaker, William Lowndes Yancey of Alabama, argued:

The gentleman said that be held in his hand a suggestion from a friend from Georgia: 'If it is right to raise slaves for sale is it not right to import them?' ... Suppose a Captain from New Orleans were to ask the gentleman from Virginia if it was lawful for him to buy slaves and take them to New Orleans. The answer would be that it was lawful provided he did not buy them in Cuba, Brazil, or Africa. The Captain would ask 'where shall I buy them?' The gentleman actuated by that principle of interest which governs all mankind would naturally tell him to come to Richmond and buy his slaves there. Now if it is right to buy slaves in Virginia and carry them to New Orleans, why is it not right to buy them in Cuba, Brazil, or Africa, and carry them there? The gentleman will say there is nothing wrong in that morally, but he would point to the Federal statistics which discriminate in favor of Virginia and against Cuba, Brazil, and Africa, preventing the Captain from buying his slaves where he could obtain them cheapest. South Carolina has her peculiar notions of free trade and at one time her State bristled with arms in support of her right to buy sugar in Cuba instead of Louisiana. And yet she is now compelled to buy slaves in Virginia instead of Cuba, Brazil, or Africa.

By 1859 piracy was such that Maryland papers were reporting the trade was effectively open again and "a bark had sailed from Jacksonville for the African coast several weeks before to take on a cargo of negroes for sale in Georgia and Florida. And on the preceding day, a brig had left port to meet the bark and transfer the cargo at sea. The result of this venture is not known."

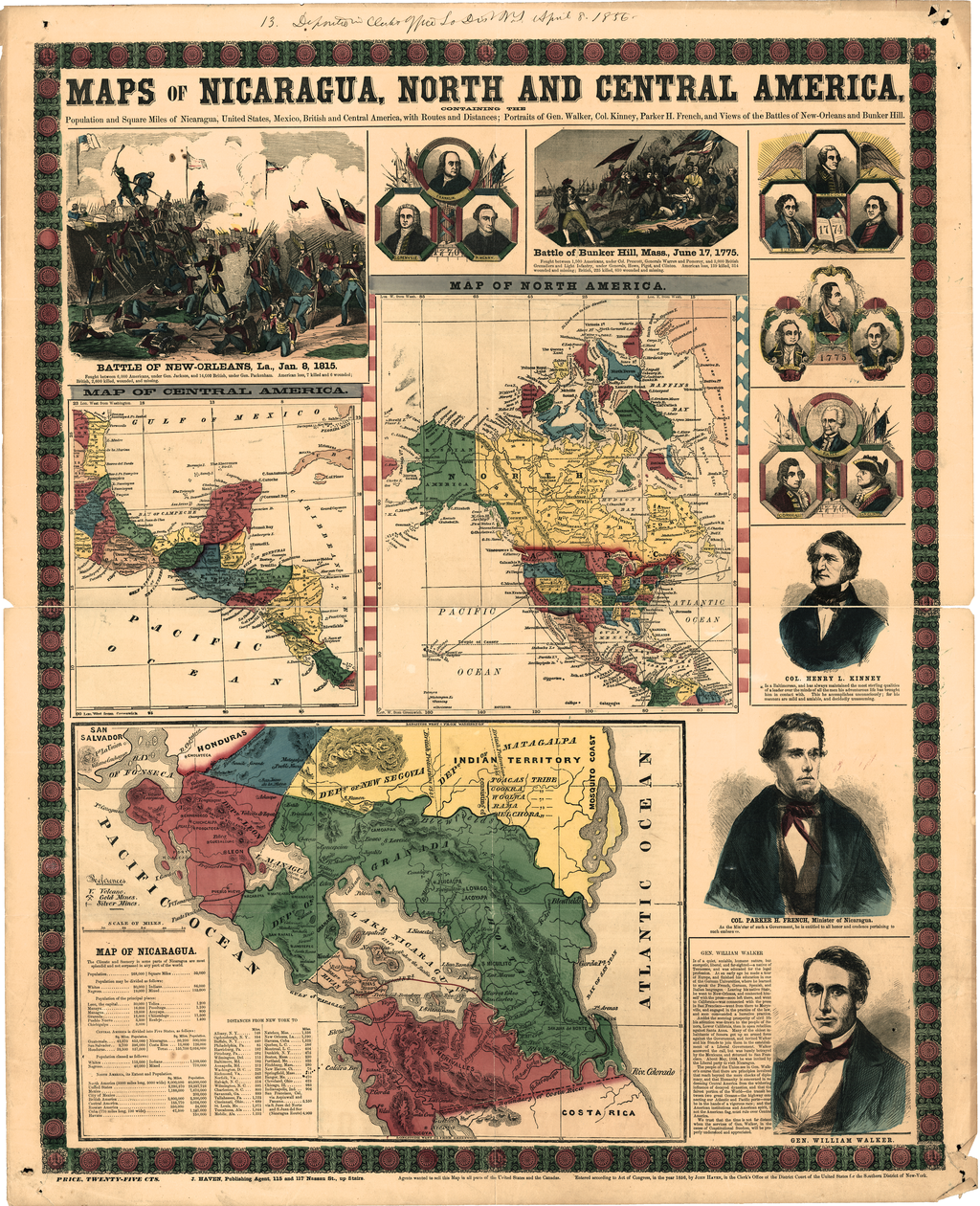
Map depicting William Walker, one of the freelance colonizers called "filibusters" who sought to capture Central American or Caribbean land to expand the territory of the United States where slavery was legal (see also Narciso López); the failed filibuster invasions of Nicaragua and Cuba, which occurred in the 1850s, were funded by slave owners and slave traders in the American South

A resolution was passed to similar effect in Louisiana in 1859. A Louisiana newspaper editorial argued, "The minute you put it out of the power of common farmers to purchase a Negro man or woman to help him in his farm or his wife in the house, you make him an abolitionist at once." The position was strongly advocated by the radical militant Fire-Eaters.

Nathan Bedford Forrest advocated for human trafficking from overseas, both before and even after the American Civil War. In 1859 he resold some of the Africans illegally imported on the Wanderer before the Civil War. Later, in 1869, he told the New York Times that his plan for a new Southern labor force would be, "Get them from Africa .... They'll improve after getting here; are the most imitative creatures in the world, and if you put them in squads of ten, with on [sic] experienced leader in each squad, they will soon revive our country."

There were apparently sectional differences amongst the slave states about the idea: "Thomas Walton of Mississippi said in an essay appearing in DeBow's Review for January, 1859, that if a southern confederacy were formed Virginia and Kentucky would prevent the re-opening of the African trade for the sake of their own dealers."

== See also ==
- Filibuster War – 1856–57 invasion of Nicaragua by American filibuster William Walker
- Knights of the Golden Circle – Secret society in the mid-19th-century US
- Post-1808 importation of slaves to the United States
- Proslavery thought – Ideology that supports slavery
- Pro-slavery ideology in the United States – Prevailing view in the Southern US prior to the American Civil War
- Slave trade in the United States

== Sources ==
- Dodd, Dorothy (January 1935). "The Schooner Emperor: An Incident of the Illegal Slave Trade in Florida". Florida Historical Quarterly. 13 (3) 3: 117–128 – via University of Central Florida Libraries.
