= History of slavery in Mississippi =

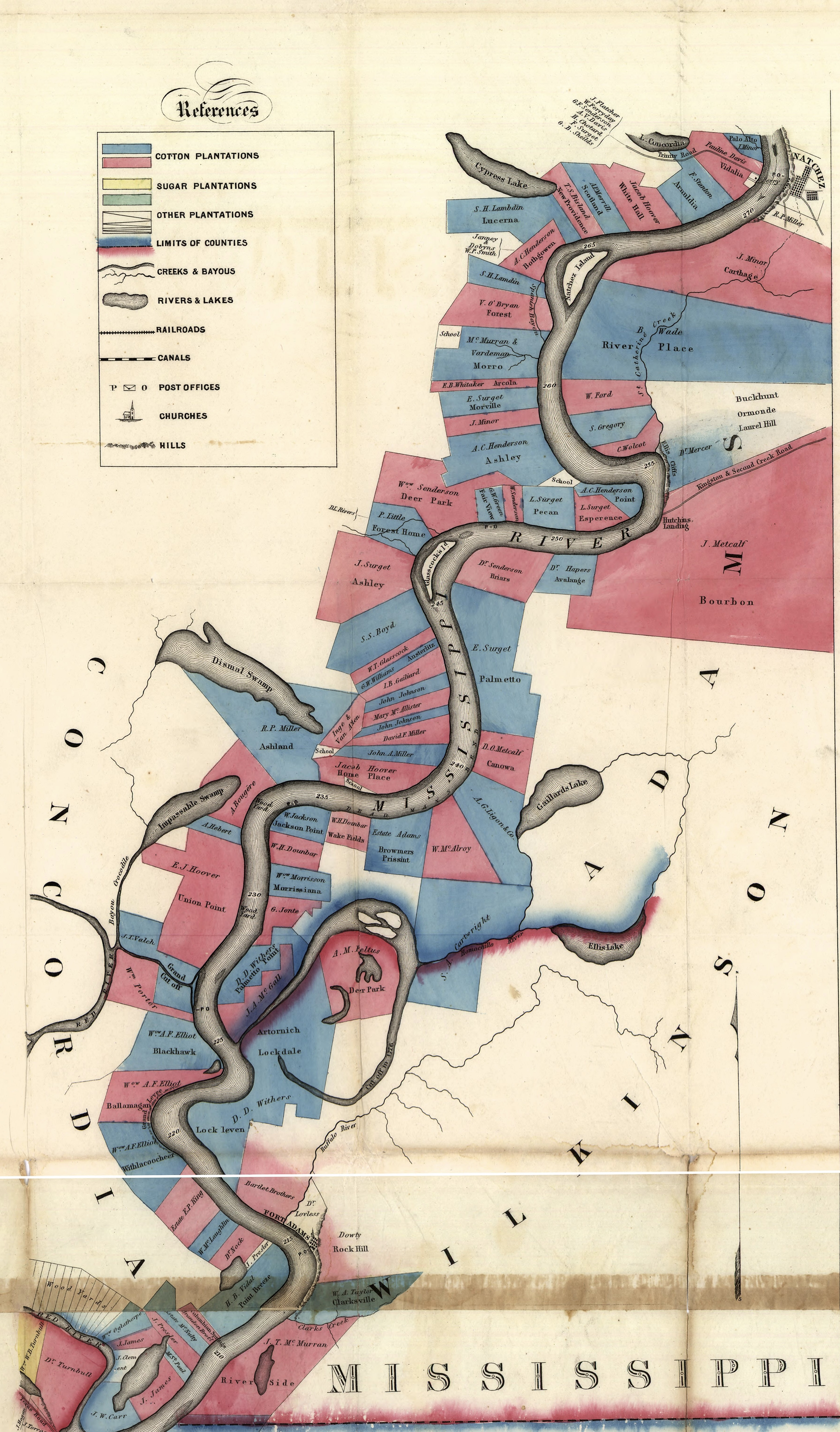
Natchez to New Orleans: Norman's chart of the lower Mississippi River by A. Persac (1858) showing cotton plantations of Mississippi along the Mississippi River, Natchez to state line

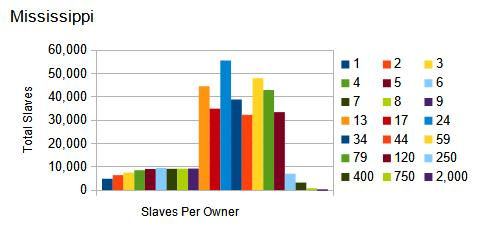
1860 US census, Mississippi, number of slaves per enslaver

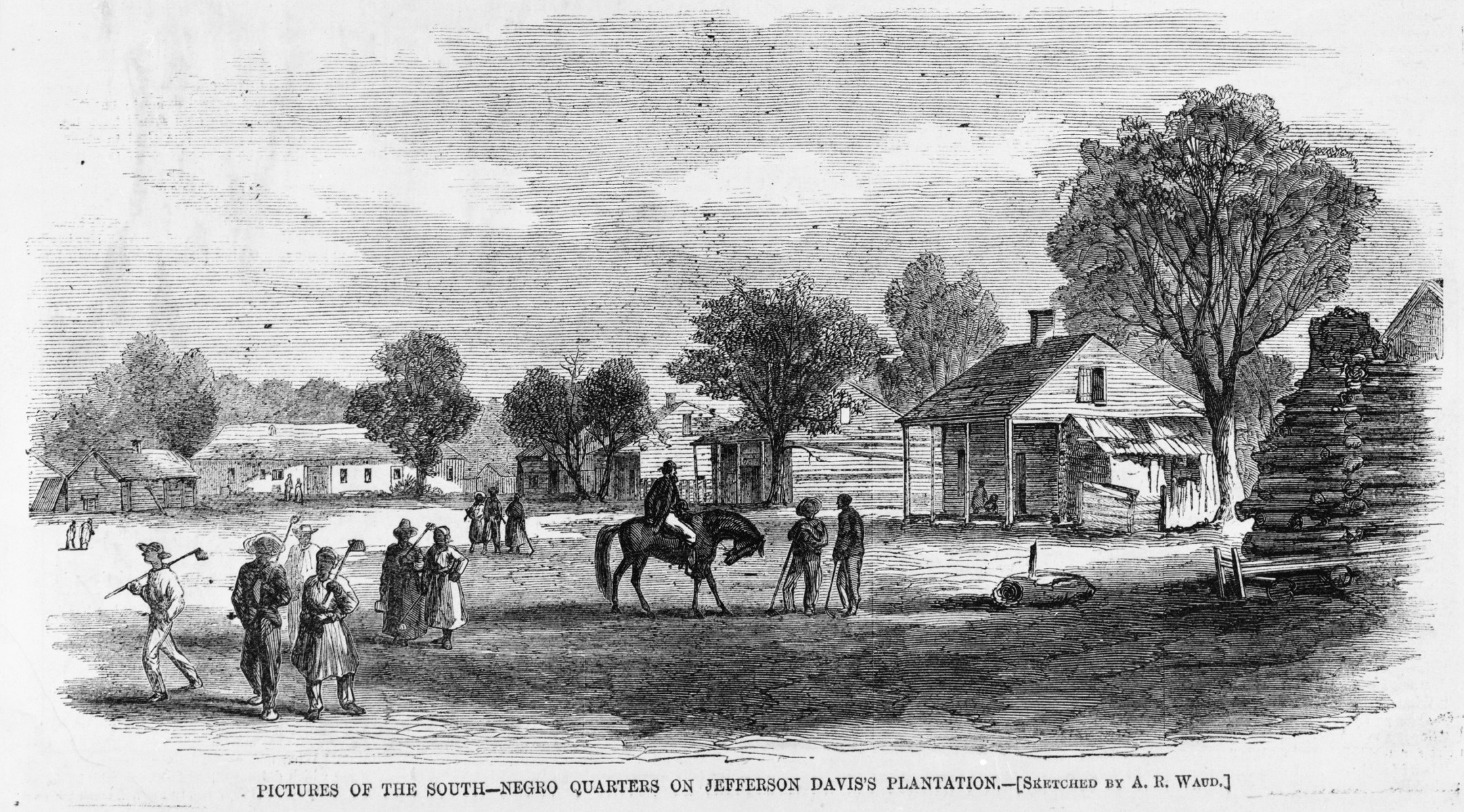
Former slave quarters at Jefferson Davis' plantation Brierfield in Mississippi, drawn by A.R. Waud, etching published 1866 in Harper's Weekly

The history of slavery in Mississippi began when the region was still Mississippi Territory and continued until abolition in 1865. The U.S. state of Mississippi had one of the largest populations of enslaved people in the Confederacy, third behind Virginia and Georgia. There were very few free people of color in Mississippi the year before the American Civil War: the ratio was one freedman for every 575 enslaved persons.

== Legal history ==
Following the Pinckney's Treaty of 1795, the United States assumed control over the Mississippi territory. Early territorial legislation prohibited the importation of enslaved people from other regions. However, pressure from affluent planters, who argued for increased slave labor, led to a relaxation of these restrictions. In practice, prohibitions on interregional slave trading were subsequently disregarded and fell into desuetude. During the early decades of the 19th century in Mississippi, a sustained process of Indigenous dispossession unfolded, as settlers forcibly removed Choctaw and Chickasaw communities from their ancestral lands. As the historian Walter Johnson observes it, "African-American slaves were brought in to cultivate the land expropriated from Native Americans."

The Mississippi slave code, first passed into law by the Mississippi Legislature in 1823, prohibited groups of five or more enslaved people from gathering as unlawful assembly and leaving a plantation without a handwritten slave pass was prohibited, even to attend religious services. Under antebellum Mississippi law, the standard penalty for an enslaved person convicted of carrying a gun, petty theft, or attending a reading or writing class was 39 lashes.

== Economic history ==
Land in Mississippi was river bottomland rich in organic matter—"the Mississippi and Yazoo, the Tombigbee, Big Black, and the Pearl covered an area of over one-sixth of the entire state and offered unrivalled soil"—and this land was primarily used to grow the highly valuable cash crop cotton produced with the labor of hundreds of thousands of enslaved American laborers of African descent. According to David Walker Howe in What Hath God Wrought, overseas cotton sales in 1836 exceeded US$71,000,000 (equivalent to $2,081,590,909 in 2025), and by 1840, the cotton crop was 59 percent of the total value of U.S. exports. Mississippi cotton was a strain produced by crossing a large-bolled variety from Mexico with a green-seed variety from Tennessee that "grew better on piedmont and interior lands" than sea island cotton. The land clearance and plowing necessary to create thousands of acres of mono-crop cotton plantations was ultimately debilitating to the soil, the river, and the native ecosystem.

Population growth in Mississippi in the years 1830–1860 was overwhelmingly due to the interstate slave trade. Enslaved people were imported from the slave states of the upper south and sold at Mississippi slave markets, including the Forks of the Road at Natchez, at Vicksburg, and at some other smaller trading sites.

In Issaquena County, 92.5 percent of population in 1860 were slaves, the highest concentration anywhere in the United States. The U.S. census that year showed 7,244 enslaved people in Issaquena County, and of 115 enslavers, 39 held 77 or more. Stephen Duncan of Issaquena County held 858 slaves, second only to Joshua John Ward of South Carolina. This considerable "value of slave property" made Issaquena County the second wealthiest county in the United States, with "mean total wealth per freeman" at $26,800 in 1860 (equivalent to $761,000 in 2024). By 1880—15 years after the abolition of slavery—the county had developed "a strong year-round market for wage labor", and Issaquena was the only county in Mississippi to report "no sharecropping or sharerenting whatsoever".

There can be little doubt that the system was bad for the economy of the state. The question of profits for the individual is another matter, and of that more in a moment, but if he was making profits, very little of them were being reinvested in enterprises that would in the long run benefit the society as a whole, such as banks, reforestation, fertilizer and soil conservation, drainage, manufacturies, ships, roads, schools, public health, and insurance companies. It was all take and no give.

— "Mississippi 1817: A Sociological and Economic Analysis" (2016)

== Defending slavery ==
Slavery was common and divisive in all of the Thirteen Colonies, but the numbers were fewer in the free states because their economies were structured not to depend upon forced labor. Therefore, the gradual abolition of slavery in the Northern United States required little economic transition. Conversely, slavery played a significant role in Mississippi's agricultural development and was the basis of the economy and society, so many Mississippi enslavers defended it and insisted upon it.

=== "Benefits" for enslaved people ===
Mississippians defended slavery in speech and through the press, arguing that slavery improved the physical and moral conditions of the enslaved people, who were otherwise "ignorant". In 1846, a writer in Columbus, Mississippi, wrote that "habits of industry, improves the physical man, tames wild propensities and passions." Additionally, a planter reasoned how enslaved people are "peculiarly fitted for his station in life." He said that enslaved peoples' skin allows them to bask in a semi-tropical sun, and unlike other people, they are content when they in an enslaved situation unless mistreated.

=== Benefits for the country ===
Mississippi enslavers also tried to portray slavery as a positive good in the United States. They emphasized the economic, social, and military advantages of slavery for the nation, especially for slavery states. They argued that slavery enabled the exploitation of large tracts of fertile land, which would otherwise go to waste since no white man could endure the labor in the marshes and ponds. They also claimed that slavery produced valuable crops, such as cotton, which enriched the country and Europe. They also said that slavery added security and strength to slavery states in case of war since the enslaved people would be loyal and obedient to their enslavers.

== Slavery laws ==
Some laws regulated slavery in Mississippi from the colonial era to the Civil War. Still, enslavers often violated the laws, which were inconsistently enforced. The laws nominally granted limited rights and protection to enslaved Mississippians, including the right to an impartial trial by jury, prohibiting the killing of enslaved people, and imposing a duty upon enslavers to treat enslaved people with humanity and provide them with basic needs, such as clothing. In 1846, a wealthy man fled the country to avoid trial for murdering one of his enslaved people.

However, enslaved people also faced harsh and extreme punishments for various offenses, such as using abusive language, lifting a hand in opposition to a white person, or stealing from a white person. The punishments were discretionary and depended on the enslaver's or the judge's decision. The treatment of enslaved people and white people for the same crimes was also very different. For instance, an enslaved person was whipped and released for stealing money, while a white man was sent to jail for the same crime.

== Slavery and agriculture ==
Slavery in Mississippi during the antebellum era was deeply intertwined with agriculture and, in particular, cotton production. Enslaved farmers in Mississippi also produced corn and vegetables for plantations, but they mostly focused on cotton production since cotton made the most money.

Cotton production introduced a gang system of labor, where enslaved people worked in groups with less autonomy than traditional task systems. These groups were assigned specific tasks, with white overseers monitoring the progress of the gangs. Enslavers often enforced work pace through public whippings, which introduced an element of cruelty to the gang labor system.

Cotton production also involved year-round labor for seed removal from lint, which led to resistance and gin fires during harvesting and ginning seasons. However, from the 1830s, the cotton gin became normalized as plantation equipment, and resistance lessened.

== Native Americans ==
The French, who settled in Mississippi in 1699, fought with the Natchez people (Native American people who lived in the Natchez Bluffs) over control of the land near modern-day Natchez for their agriculture interests. In the Natchez War of 1729–33, the French enslaved many Natchez, most of whom the Choctaw captured, another group of indigenous people, and sold them to the West Indies. French colonists continued to buy enslaved Native American peoples from the Southwest and Missouri Country even after the slave wars in the southeastern United States came to an end.

== Abolishment ==
Even after President Abraham Lincoln issued the Emancipation Proclamation on January 1, 1863, Mississippians continued to engage in slavery. The proclamation said that all enslaved people in the rebel states "shall then, thenceforward, and forever free". Enforcement of the Proclamation in Mississippi only became possible after the United States government regained control of the state. As a result, the proclamation did not immediately result in an end of slavery in Mississippi, and many people remained enslaved until the Thirteenth Amendment.

Slavery was effectively abolished in Mississippi by the Thirteenth Amendment. However, the Thirteenth Amendment was not ratified until 2013. Mississippi was the only state in the Lower Mississippi Valley that did not abolish slavery during the American Civil War. The state did not officially notify the U.S. archivist of its ratification of the Thirteenth Amendment until 2013.

== See also ==
- History of slavery in the United States by state
- History of Mississippi § Slavery
