= Mississippi Free Trader =

Natchez newspaper (1835–1861)

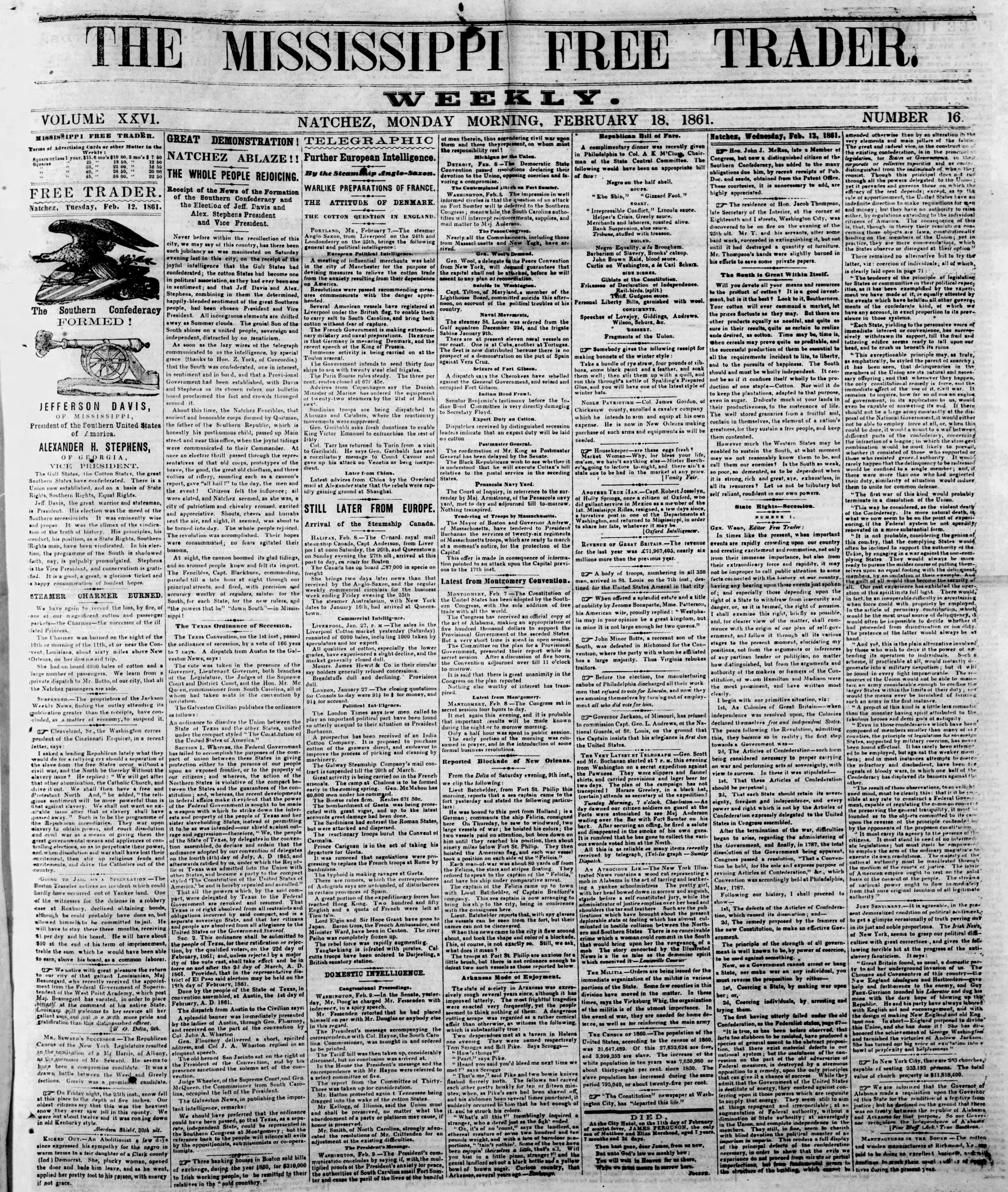
One of the last known issues of the Mississippi Free Trader celebrated the organization of the Confederate States of America

The Mississippi Free Trader was a newspaper in Natchez, Mississippi, United States that was published from August 4, 1835 until 1861. According to the Historical Records Survey it is distinct from the Mississippi Free Trader and Natchez Gazette that published from 1835 until 1851, but the Library of Congress considers them related publications. J. F. H. Claiborne, known for his Mississippi histories, was editor of the latter at one time. The Free Trader was associated with the Democratic Party during the Second Party System era.
