= History of slavery in Kentucky =

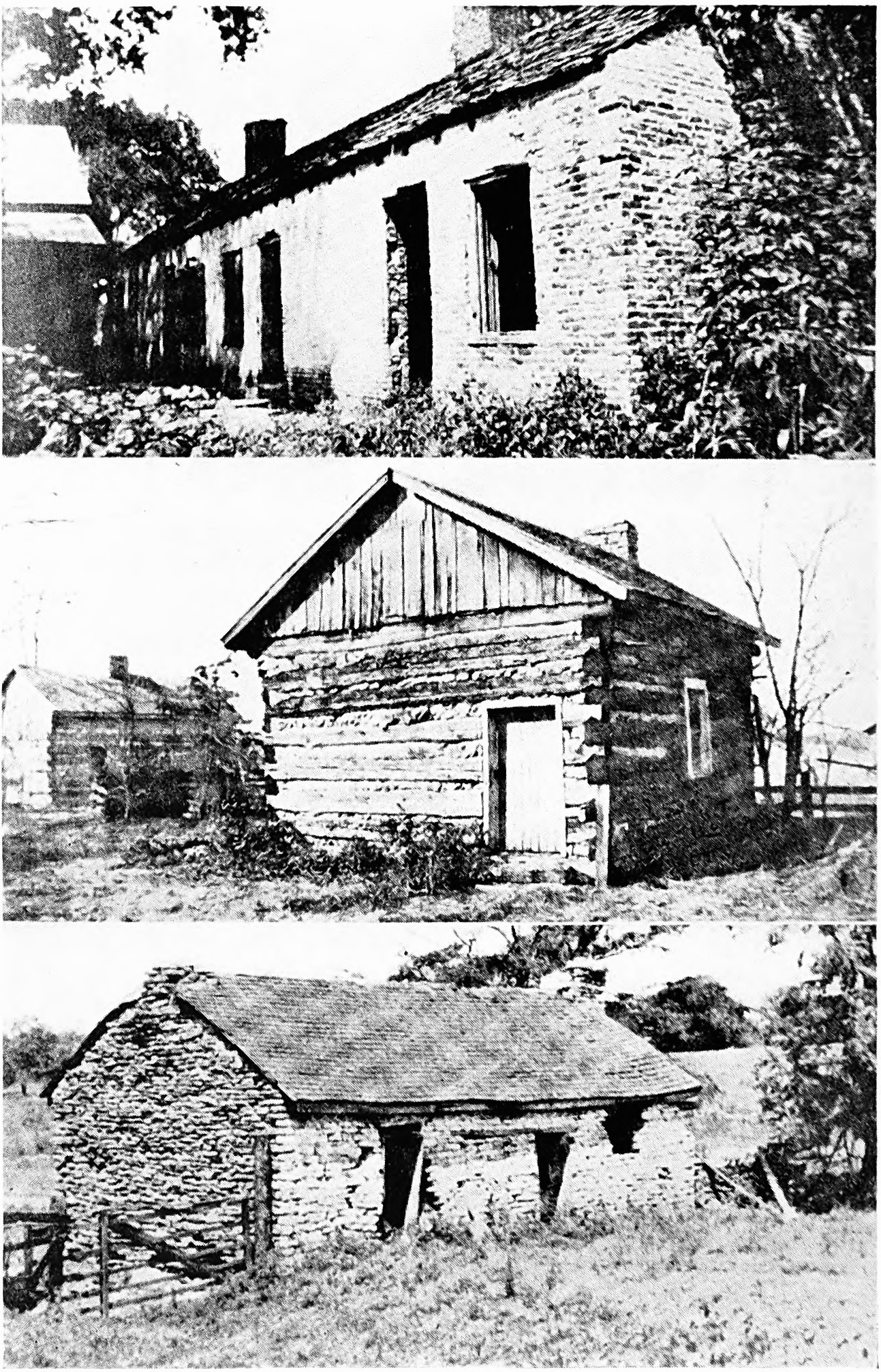
Slave cabins in the Bluegrass (Coleman Collection, published by William H. Townsend, 1955)

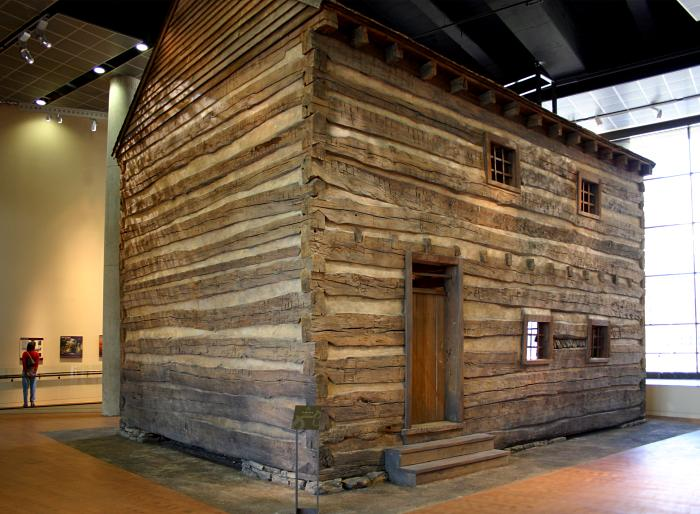
Mason County, Kentucky, slave pen now at the National Underground Railroad Freedom Center in Cincinnati, Ohio

The history of slavery in Kentucky dates from the earliest permanent European settlements in the state, until the end of the Civil War. In 1830, enslaved African Americans represented 24 percent of Kentucky's population, a share that declined to 19.5 percent by 1860, on the eve of the Civil War. Most enslaved people were concentrated in the cities of Louisville and Lexington and in the hemp- and tobacco-producing Bluegrass Region and Jackson Purchase. Other enslaved people lived in the Ohio River counties, where they were most often used in skilled trades or as house servants. Relatively few people were held in slavery in the mountainous regions of eastern and southeastern Kentucky, where they served primarily as artisans and service workers in towns.

Kentucky was classified as the Upper South or a border state, between free states to the north and fellow slave-owning states to the south. Its farmers included independent, hardscrabble white farming families as well as plantation owners like those of the Deep South. Kentucky had southern economic, cultural, and social ties to slavery and plantations, and engagement with northern free-state industrialism and also western frontier ethos.

Kentucky entered the Union as a state deeply divided over the issue of slavery. The conflicting pulls of northern economic relations, westward expansion, and fundamental southern support for slavery and southern-style plantations caused Kentuckians to be morally divided over the issue of slavery before, during, and immediately after the Civil War.

Ellen Scott was raised enslaved in Owensboro, in Daviess County, Kentucky, as property of a planter named Albert Ewell. On the occasion of Lincoln's birthday in 1930, she recalled to a newspaper reporter her emancipation at age 12: "We could not feel the joy that folks think we felt. We had not been taught to have feelings, except fear; ground down, beaten, taught that negroes should not be allowed to read or write, there was but one thing we thought of. It was the lash, the horrible way it whistled on our backs, and the beatings we received...We are happy now. The Negro is making progress and becoming educated. I try to forget the days when I was a child. I have forgotten everything but the whip and the war."

== Overview ==
Prior to 1792, Kentucky formed the far-western frontier of Virginia, which had a long history of slavery and indentured servitude.

In early Kentucky history, slavery was an integral part of the state's economy, though the use of slavery varied widely in a geographically diverse state. From 1790 to 1860, the slave population of Kentucky was never more than one-quarter of the total population. After 1830, as tobacco production decreased in favor of less labor-intensive crops, much of the planter class in the central and western part of the state sold enslaved Africans to markets in the Deep South, where the demand for agricultural labor rose rapidly as cotton cultivation was expanded. It was lucrative for slave owners to sell the people they enslaved to the deep south, shipping approximately 80,000 stolen Africans southward between 1830 and 1860.

Kentucky's enslaved population was concentrated in the "bluegrass" central region of the state as well as its western region, which was rich in farmland and a center of agriculture. In less populated mountainous areas of Kentucky with independent farmers, slave ownership was much less frequent. In 1850, 28 percent of Kentucky's white families held enslaved African Americans. 5% of slave owners had 100 or more slaves. In Lexington, enslaved people outnumbered the enslavers: 10,000 enslaved were owned by 1,700 slave owners. Lexington was a central city in the state for the slave trade. 12 percent of Kentucky's slave owners enslaved 20 or more people, 70 white families enslaved 50 or more people. Fluctuating markets, seasonal needs and widely varying geographical conditions characterized Kentucky slavery.

The enslaved people were a key part of the settlement of Kentucky in the 1750s and 1760s, as permanent settlers started arriving in the late 1770s, especially after the American Revolution, some brought slaves to clear and develop the land. Early settlements were called stations and developed around forts for protection against indigenous peoples such as the Shawnee, Cherokee, Chickasaw and Osage, with whom there were numerous violent conflicts. Most of the early settlers were from Virginia, and some relied on slave labor as they developed larger, more permanent plantations.

Planters who grew hemp and tobacco, which were labor-intensive crops, held more slaves than did smaller farmers who cultivated mixed crops. Subsistence agriculture could be done without any slave labor, although some subsistence farmers held a few slaves with whom they would work. Some owners also used enslaved African Americans in mining and manufacturing operations, for work on riverboats and along the waterfront, and to work in skilled trades in towns.

Early farms and plantations in Kentucky tended to be smaller and more akin to those in Virginia and North Carolina than the later bigger plantation complexes common in the Deep South, so most slaveholders had a small number of slaves except for the top layer of planters. As a result, many slaves had to find spouses "abroad", on a neighboring farm. Often, African American men had to live apart from their wives and children.

It was not infrequent for slaves to be "hired out", leased on temporary basis to other farmers or business for seasonal work. This was a common practice across the upper south. Some historians estimate that 12% of the slaves in Lexington and 16% of the slaves in Louisville were hired out.

Kentucky contained small but notable free black hamlets throughout the state. About 5% of Kentucky's black population was free by 1860. Free Negroes were among the slaveholders; in 1830, this group held slaves in 29 of Kentucky's counties. In some cases, people would purchase their spouse, their children, or other enslaved relatives in order to protect them until they could free them. After the 1831 Nat Turner's slave rebellion, the legislature passed new restrictions against manumission, requiring acts of the legislature to gain freedom.

Kentucky exported more slaves than did most states. From 1850 to 1860, 16 percent of enslaved African Americans were sold out of state, as part of the forced displacement to the Deep South of a total of more than a million African Americans before the Civil War. Many slaves were sold directly to plantations in the Deep South from the Louisville slave market, or were transported by slave traders along the Ohio and Mississippi rivers to slave markets in New Orleans, hence the later euphemism "sold down the river" for any sort of betrayal. Kentucky had a surplus of slaves due to reduced labor needs from changes in local agriculture, as well as substantial out-migration by white families from Kentucky.

Beginning in the 1820s and extending through the 1840s and 1850s, many white families migrated west to Missouri, south to Tennessee, or southwest to Texas. The larger slave-holding families took slaves with them, as one kind of forced migration. These factors combined to create greater instability for enslaved families in Kentucky than in some other areas.

== Fugitive slaves ==
As Kentucky was separated from free states only by the Ohio River, it was relatively easy for an enslaved person from Kentucky to escape to freedom. Notable fugitives from Kentucky included Henry Bibb, Lewis Clarke, Margaret Garner, Lewis Hayden, and Josiah Henson. The formerly enslaved James Bradley legally left Kentucky by this route.

On September 17, 1826, Bourbon County, Kentucky, slave traders Edward Stone and his nephew Howard Stone were among the five white men killed by the 75 or so slaves who were being taken down river aboard a flatboat. Edward Stone had kept his slaves in Bourbon County, chained and shackled beneath his house. In September 1826, a group of the slaves were marched to Mason County, Kentucky, where they were taken aboard the flatboat headed to the Mississippi slave market.

David Cobb of Lexington, Kentucky, and James Gray were hired to convey the crew down the Ohio River. The boat stopped in Louisville, Kentucky, where a white man named Davis boarded the boat. Davis was from Natchez, Mississippi, or Paris, Kentucky, depending on the account. The boat had gone about another 100 miles when the slaves revolted and killed the five white men and threw their bodies overboard. The 75 slaves, males and females of various ages, attempted to escape into Indiana, which had become a state in 1816 with a constitution that prohibited slavery, though there were both free Blacks and slaves in the state.

There were also active Underground Railroad stations in Indiana, two of which were along the Ohio River bordering Kentucky and near Breckinridge County, Kentucky. In 1824, Indiana passed one of the earliest forms of a fugitive slave law. The slaves who had escaped from the flatboat were fugitives, property that could be reclaimed. Fifty-six of the slaves were captured and returned to Kentucky to be lodged in the Hardinsburg (Breckinridge County) jail. A Baltimore newspaper reported that some of the slaves were brought to Maryland and sold. Three of the slaves supposedly admitted taking part in the revolt. Nothing is known or has ever been written about the 19 slaves who escaped, nor has it been acknowledged that there were slaves on the flatboat who made their way to freedom. Five of the captured slaves were hanged: their names, the only names given to any of the slaves in the newspapers, were Jo, Duke, Resin, Stephen, and Wesley. One other slave named Roseberry's Jim is mentioned in the Village Register newspaper. According to the article, five of the slaves were hanged; forty-seven were sold; the remainder was brought back to Bourbon County.

Later, in August 1848, a group of 55 to 75 armed slaves fled from Fayette County and the surrounding areas in what is considered one of the largest coordinated slave escape attempts in American history. A white man named Patrick Doyle was suspected to have agreed to guide the slaves to freedom in Ohio in exchange for payment from each slave. The slaves made their way through Kentucky until they reached Bracken County, where they were stopped by around 100 armed men with General Lucius B. Desha (1812–1885) from Harrison County leading them.

As a result of the altercation, around 40 of the escaped slaves fled to the woods while the rest, including Patrick Doyle, were arrested. The slaves were subsequently returned to their enslavers while Doyle was sent to a state penitentiary for 20 years by the Fayette Circuit Court.

== Abolitionism ==
The abolition movement developed in the state by the 1790s, when Presbyterian minister David Rice unsuccessfully lobbied to include a slavery prohibition in each of the state's first two constitutions, created in 1792 and 1799. Baptist ministers David Barrow and Carter Tarrant formed the Kentucky Abolition Society in 1808. By 1822, it began publishing one of America's first anti-slavery periodicals.

Conservative emancipation, which argued for gradually freeing the slaves and assisting them in a return to Africa, as proposed by the American Colonization Society, gained substantial support in the state from the 1820s onward. Cassius Marcellus Clay was a vocal advocate of this position. His newspaper was shut down by mob action in 1845. The anti-slavery Louisville Examiner was published successfully from 1847 to 1849.

== Politics ==
In Kentucky as was common in other parts of the Upper South, slavery was not as integral to the economy as it developed in the Deep South. The small-farm nature of much of Kentucky and whose plantations were based around tobacco like those in Virginia and North Carolina instead of cotton, meant that slave labor was not so critical to profits as it was for the labor-intensive crops of the Deep South, such as cotton, sugar, and rice farming. But Louisville became a major slave market in the South, which generated considerable profits.

Controversial laws in 1815 and 1833 limited the importation of slaves into Kentucky, which created the strictest rules of any slave state. The Nonimportation Act of 1833 banned any importation of slaves for commercial or personal purpose. The ban was widely violated, especially in counties near the Tennessee border.

Slavery was the principal issue that led to the third constitutional convention held in 1849. While the convention was convened by anti-slavery advocates who hoped to amend the constitution to prohibit slavery, they greatly underestimated pro-slavery support. The convention became packed with pro-slavery delegates, who drafted what some historians consider the most pro-slavery constitution in United States history. It repealed the prohibition on bringing slaves into the state.

After the embarrassing defeat, abolitionists lost political power during the 1850s. Anti-slavery newspapers were still published in Louisville and Newport; but support for slavery was widespread in Louisville. Thousands of households in Louisville enslaved people, and the city had the largest slave population in the state. In addition, for years the slave trade from the Upper South had contributed to the city's prosperity and growth. Through the 1850s, the city exported 2,500–4,000 slaves a year in sales to the Deep South. The trading city had grown rapidly and had 70,000 residents by 1860.

John Gregg Fee established a network of abolitionist schools, communities and churches in Eastern Kentucky, (see Berea College, Berea, Kentucky) where slaveholders were the fewest in number. In the turmoil following John Brown's raid on Harper's Ferry, Fee and his supporters were driven from the state by a white mob in 1859.

== Civil War ==
Kentucky did not abolish slavery during the Civil War, as did the border states of Maryland and Missouri. However, during the war, more than 70% of slaves in Kentucky were freed or escaped to Union lines. The war undermined the institution of slavery. Enslaved people quickly learned that authority and protection resided with the Union army. When Union military lines moved into areas previously held by Confederates, slaveholders often fled, leaving property and enslaved people behind. Most of these abandoned people immediately assumed the stance of free blacks. The war broke down the control that slaveowners had on slaves. By 1862, it had become common for Kentucky slaves to ask for wages in return for their labor. When denied, these people often fled enslavement. Enslaved people also enlisted in the Union army, thereby securing the rights of free men. By the war's end, Kentucky had mustered 23,703 African-American men into federal service.

The Kentucky legislature considered a conditional ratification of the Thirteenth Amendment, to deny freedmen and other blacks constitutional rights and require them to leave the state within ten years of freedom. Instead, it rejected the Amendment. Even after the conclusion of the Civil War and fall of the Confederacy, slaveholders in Kentucky continued to believe that slavery would continue to exist, or hoped that compensated emancipation for slavers would be adopted and continued to hold and trade enslaved people through most of 1865. Slavery legally ended in the state on December 18, 1865, when the 13th Amendment became part of the Constitution without ratification by Kentucky, although in 1976 the state symbolically ratified it.

== See also ==
- History of Kentucky
- Kentucky in the American Civil War
- Louisville in the American Civil War
- The Filson Historical Society
- List of plantations in Kentucky
- History of slavery in the United States by state
- List of Kentucky slave traders

== Bibliography ==
- Coleman, J. Winston (1940). Slavery Times in Kentucky. online
- Harrison, Lowell H. (1978). The Antislavery Movement in Kentucky.
- Lowell Hayes Harrison, and James C. Klotter, A New History of Kentucky, Lexington, KY: University Press of Kentucky, 1997.
- "Memories of Slavery Days in Kentucky". Filson Club History Quarterly: 242–57. July 1973.
- Vorenberg, Michael (2001). Final Freedom: The Civil War, the Abolition of Slavery, and the Thirteenth Amendment. Cambridge University Press. ISBN 9781139428002. Archived from the original on October 10, 2017 – via Questia.
