= J. Winston Coleman =

American historian (1898–1983)

J. Winston Coleman (November 5, 1898 – May 4, 1983) was an American tobacco farmer, contractor, newspaper columnist, historian, book collector, and bibliographer who specialized in the study of 19th-century Kentucky, United States. He graduated from the University of Kentucky in the 1920s with a bachelor's and master's in mechanical engineering. He worked as a building contractor and started the historical work as a hobby. He wrote a newspaper column on Kentucky historical topics for 20 years. A lifelong resident of Lexington, Coleman owned Winburn Farm from 1936 until his death. There was an exhibit of "slave lore" collected by Coleman at the University of Kentucky in 1940.

In addition to writing several books, he published over 50 pamphlets. In the late 1960s he donated "3,500 books and pamphlets," scrapbooks, photographs, "Kentucky church histories, maps, atlases, personal correspondence and manuscripts" to Transylvania University in Lexington, Kentucky. His Slavery Times in Kentucky remains a standard reference on the topic, and papers and images he collected during his research are held at the University of Kentucky libraries.

He died of a self-inflicted gunshot wound in 1983 after a long illness. Coleman was buried at Lexington Cemetery.

== Selected works ==
- Masonry in the Bluegrass (1933)
- Stagecoach Days in the Bluegrass (1935)
- Slavery Times in Kentucky (1940)
- A Bibliography of Kentucky History (1940)
- Historic Kentucky (1967)
- Lexington During the Civil War (1968)
- Famous Kentucky Duels
- The Springs of Kentucky
