= List of Mississippi slave traders =

This is a list of slave traders active in the U.S. state of Mississippi from settlement until 1865.

- Robert S. Adams, Aberdeen, Mississippi
- William L. Arick, Jackson and Choctaw Nation
- Joshua Baker, Natchez
- B. F. Ballance, Vicksburg
- C. J. Blackman, Yazoo City, Mississippi
- Louis Boisdore, Hancock County near Bay St. Louis
- Bright, Mississippi
- Tom Brown, Virginia and Mississippi
- Mr. Brunice, Natchez
- John L. Buck, Natchez, Mississippi
- Samuel W. Butler, Natchez, Mississippi
- Mr. Carrod, Mississippi and South Carolina
- Lewis A. Collier, Richmond, Virginia and Natchez, Mississippi
- James Cook, Paris, Tennessee, and Mississippi
- J. Cooper, Natchez-under-the-Hill, Mississippi
- Robert Dowling, Jackson
- English, North Carolina and Mississippi
- R. C. Faulkner, Mississippi
- William H. Gwinn, Vicksburg
- Dick Featherson, Tennessee and Mississippi
- David Fitzpatrick, Vicksburg, Miss.
- John D. Fondren, Mississippi
- Aaron H. Forrest, Memphis, and Vicksburg, Miss.
- Jeffrey E. Forrest, Memphis, and Vicksburg, Miss.
- E. Frazer & Co., Port Gibson, Miss.
- Goodman, Mississippi
- Gordan or Gordon, Maryland and Mississippi
- Griffin & Pullum, Natchez, Miss., principals Pierce Griffin, W. A. Pullum, A. Blackwell, F. G. Murphy
- Lewis K. Grigsby, Natchez, Miss.
- Henry Hall, Kentucky, Tennessee, and Mississippi
- O. R. Haley, Mississippi
- Mr. Hall, Norfolk, Va. and Mississippi
- Jonathan Harding, Sumner Co., Tennessee, and Natchez
- G. C. Harness, Potomac River and Natchez
- William L. Harper, Virginia and Jefferson County, Miss.
- John F. Harris, Natchez
- John Hawkins, Virginia & Robert Hawkins, Mississippi
- Robert C. Hawkins, Natchez
- Ned Herndon, Mississippi
- Peter Herndon, Monroe Co., Miss.
- Herring, Vicksburg, Miss.
- Pleasant Hunter, Natchez, Miss.
- Andrew Jackson and John Hutchings, Nashville and Natchez
- Robert Irwin, Natchez
- John D. James, Thomas G. James, and David D. James, Nashville, Richmond, Va. and Natchez, Miss.
- Richard Johnson & Jesse Meek, Tennessee and Forks of the Road
- S. S. Jones, De Soto, Miss.
- William P. Lacey, Natchez
- Tedence Lane, Mississippi
- Lillard & Slaughter, Mississippi
- Livingston, Hanna & Co., Vicksburg, Miss.
- J. and D. Long, Natchez
- Lundy, Rives & Rives, Natchez
- Maffitt, Mississippi
- John D. Mallory, Virginia and eastern Mississippi
- John Mason, Natchez, Miss.
- Matthews, Branton & Co., Natchez, Miss.
- N. A. McNairy, Nashville and Natchez
- C. A. & I. S. Merrill, Mississippi
- Ladson Mills, North Carolina and Mississippi
- John Miller, Kentucky and Mississippi
- R. B. Miller, Hinds Co., Miss.
- Louis Miller & Co., Natchez, Miss.
- A. Mizell, Jackson
- Arthur Mosely, Virginia and Mississippi
- Oliver Neely, Jackson
- Charles Nox, Natchez
- Parker, Vicksburg, Miss.
- P. Pascal, Natchez
- Jesse Perkins
- Peterson, Natchez
- R. A. Peuyeur, Natchez
- Peyton, Mason & Co., Mississippi
- John P. Phillips, Natchez
- B. W. Powell, Forks of the Road
- Benjamin Ward Powell, Natchez, Miss., Louisville, Ky. and New Orleans
- Pryor, Memphis and Natchez?
- Dr. Ray, Tennessee (?) and Mississippi
- Redman, Mississippi and Tennessee
- Redman, Noxubee County, Mississippi
- John Reed, Tennessee and Mississippi
- John Robertson, Mississippi and either New Orleans or Mobile
- William Rochel, Virginia and Natchez
- Samuel Roe
- Rowan & Harris, Mississippi
- Thomas Sanders, Washington County, Virginia, and Mississippi
- Sprague & Howell, Natchez
- Mr. Stokes, North Carolina and Mississippi
- Richard Terrell, Virginia, Natchez and New Orleans
- Tiernan & Alexander, Natchez
- Townshend & Lewis, Mississippi
- Urley, Mississippi
- Weatherly, Breden & Bagget, Yazoo City, Miss.
- Wetherby, Pigsah, Miss.
- Henry Vanhusen, Mississippi and Texas
- Benjamin W. Walker, Jackson, Miss.
- Samuel Wakefield, Natchez
- Moses J. Wicks, Aberdeen, Miss.
- Winfield, Mississippi
- John Wood, Natchez
- Thomas Woods, North Carolina and Mississippi
- John Woolfolk, Natchez, Miss.

== Sources ==
- Ball, Edward (2014) [1998]. Slaves in the Family. Macmillan. ISBN 9780374534455. LCCN 97034640.
- Bancroft, Frederic (2023) [1931]. Slave Trading in the Old South. Southern Classics Series. Introduction by Michael Tadman. University of South Carolina Press. ISBN 978-1-64336-427-8.
- Bellamy, Donnie D. (1984). "Macon, Georgia, 1823–1860: A Study in Urban Slavery". Phylon. 45 (4): 298–310. doi:10.2307/274910. JSTOR 274910.
- Bogert, Pen (Spring 2002). "Sold for My Account: The Early Slave Trade Between Kentucky and the Lower Mississippi Valley". Ohio Valley History. 2 (1): 3–16. ISSN 2377-0600.
- Calderhead, William (1977). "The Role of the Professional Slave Trader in a Slave Economy: Austin Woolfolk, A Case Study". Civil War History. 23 (3): 195–211. doi:10.1353/cwh.1977.0041. ISSN 1533-6271. S2CID 143907436.
- Carey, Bill (2018). Runaways, Coffles and Fancy Girls: A History of Slavery in Tennessee. Nashville, Tennessee: Clearbrook Press. ISBN 978-0-9725680-4-3. LCCN 2018903570. OCLC 1045068878.
- Colby, Robert K. D. (2024). An Unholy Traffic: Slave Trading in the Civil War South. Oxford University Press. doi:10.1093/oso/9780197578261.001.0001. ISBN 9780197578285. LCCN 2023053721. OCLC 1412042395.
- Fitzpatrick, Benjamin Lewis (December 2008). Negroes for Sale: The Slave Trade in Antebellum Kentucky (Ph.D. thesis). University of Notre Dame. doi:10.7274/pn89d50750n.
- Garrett, Franklin M. (2011) [1954]. Atlanta and Environs: A Chronicle of Its People and Events, 1820s–1870s (Reprint ed.). University of Georgia Press. ISBN 9780820339023.
- Friedman, Saul (2017). Jews and the American Slave Trade. Routledge. ISBN 9781351510769.
- Gudmestad, Robert (1999). A Troublesome Commerce: The Interstate Slave Trade, 1808–1840 (Doctor of Philosophy thesis). Louisiana State University and Agricultural & Mechanical College. doi:10.31390/gradschool_disstheses.6941.
- Head, David (2013). "Slave Smuggling by Foreign Privateers: The Illegal Slave Trade and the Geopolitics of the Early Republic". Journal of the Early Republic. 33 (3): 433–462. doi:10.1353/jer.2013.0061. ISSN 0275-1275. JSTOR 24487048.
- Hedrick, Charles Embury (1927). Social and Economic Aspects of Slavery in the Transmontane Prior to 1850. George Peabody College for Teachers. Contributions to education.no. 46. Nashville, Tennessee: George Peabody College for Teachers.
- James, D. Clayton (1993) [1968]. Antebellum Natchez. Baton Rouge, Louisiana: Louisiana State University Press. ISBN 978-0-8071-1860-3. LCCN 68028496. OCLC 28281641.
- Jay, William (1844). A View of the Action of the Federal Government, In Behalf of Slavery. Utica, N.Y.: J.C. Jackson.
- Johnson, Walter (2013). River of Dark Dreams: Slavery and Empire in the Cotton Kingdom. Cambridge: Belknap Press of Harvard University Press. ISBN 9780674074880. LCCN 2012030065. OCLC 827947225. OL 26179618M.
- Johnson, Walter (2009). Soul by Soul: Life Inside the Antebellum Slave Market. Cambridge: Harvard University Press. ISBN 9780674039155. OCLC 923120203.
- Jones-Rogers, Stephanie E. (2019). They Were Her Property: White Women as Slave Owners in the American South. New Haven, Connecticut: Yale University Press. ISBN 978-0-300-21866-4.
- Kendall, John S. (January 1939). "Shadow Over the City". The Louisiana Historical Quarterly. 22 (1). New Orleans: Louisiana Historical Society: 142–165. ISSN 0095-5949. OCLC 1782268. LDS Film 1425689, Image Group Number (DGS) 1640025 – via FamilySearch Digital Library.
- Kytle, Ethan J.; Roberts, Blain (2018). Denmark Vesey's garden: slavery and memory in the cradle of the Confederacy. New York: The New Press. ISBN 9781620973660. LCCN 2017041546.
- Libby, David J. (2004). Slavery and Frontier Mississippi, 1720–1835. University Press of Mississippi. ISBN 1-57806-599-2.
- Menck, Mary (2017). The Devil's Backbone: Race, Space, and Nation-Building on the Natchez Trace (M.A. thesis). Medford, Massachusetts: Tufts University.
- Mooney, Chase C. (1971) [1957]. "Chapter Two: Hire, Sale, Theft and Flight of Slaves". Slavery in Tennessee. Westport, Conn.: Negro Universities Press. pp. 29–63. ISBN 978-0-8371-5522-7.
- Phillips, U. Bonnell (1936) [1918]. American Negro slavery: a survey of the supply, employment and control of Negro labor as determined by the plantation régime. New York: D. Appleton and Company.
- Rothman, Adam (2005). Slave Country: American Expansion and the Origins of the Deep South. Harvard University Press. doi:10.4159/9780674042919. ISBN 978-0-674-04291-9. LCCN 2004057658. OCLC 56191767.
- Schermerhorn, Calvin (2015). The business of slavery and the rise of American capitalism, 1815–1860. New Haven, Conn.: Yale University Press. ISBN 978-0-300-19200-1.
- Schermerhorn, Calvin (2016). "Chapter 10. The Coastwise Slave Trade and a Mercantile Community of Interest". In Rockman, Seth Edward; Beckert, Sven (eds.). Slavery's Capitalism: A New History of American Economic Development. Early American Studies. Philadelphia: University of Pennsylvania Press. pp. 209–224. doi:10.9783/9780812293098-011. ISBN 978-0-8122-4841-8. JSTOR j.ctt1dfnrs7. LCCN 2016304619. OCLC 945028802.
- Sellers, James Benson (2015) [1950]. "Chapter 5: Traffic in Slaves". Slavery in Alabama. Library of Alabama Classics. Introduction by Harriet E. Amos Doss. Tuscaloosa: University of Alabama Press. ISBN 9780817389147. LCCN 50004433. OCLC 899157440.
- Stowe, Harriet Beecher (1853). A key to Uncle Tom's cabin: presenting the original facts and documents upon which the story is founded. Boston: J. P. Jewett & Co. LCCN 02004230. OCLC 317690900. OL 21879838M.
- Sydnor, Charles S. (1933). Slavery in Mississippi. American Historical Association, Carnegie Corporation of New York. New York: D. Appleton-Century Co. LCCN 33033678. OCLC 1968805.
- Williams, Jennie K. (April 2, 2020). "Trouble the water: The Baltimore to New Orleans coastwise slave trade, 1820–1860". Slavery & Abolition. 41 (2): 275–303. doi:10.1080/0144039X.2019.1660509. ISSN 0144-039X. S2CID 203494471.
- Wilson, Carol (2009) [1994]. Freedom at Risk: The Kidnapping of Free Blacks in America, 1780–1865. University Press of Kentucky. ISBN 9780813149790. JSTOR j.ctt130j5m9. LCCN 93021012. OCLC 900344359.
