= List of Tennessee slave traders =

Slave traders active in Tennessee from settlement until 1865

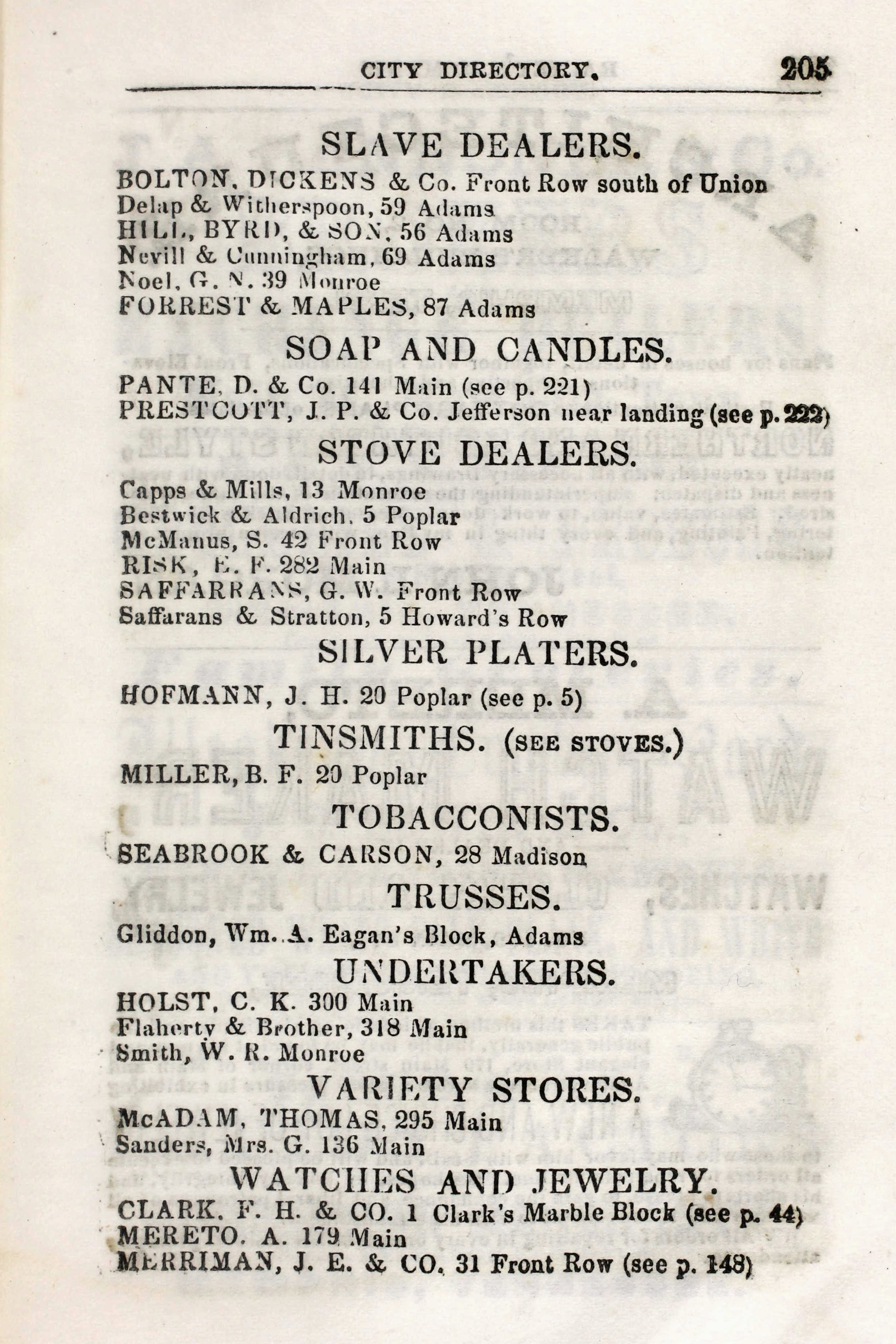
Antebellum city directories from slave states can be valuable primary sources on the trade; slave dealers listed in the 1855 directory of Memphis, Tennessee, included Bolton & Dickens, Forrest & Maples operating at 87 Adams, Neville & Cunningham, and Byrd Hill

This is a list of slave traders active in Tennessee from settlement until 1865.

- John Anderson, Nashville
- Pat Anderson, Tennessee and Louisiana
- Atkinson & Richardson, Tennessee, Kentucky, and St. Louis
- Daniel Berry, Tennessee and Texas
- Blackwell & Martin
- Isaac L. Bolton, Memphis
- Wade H. Bolton, Memphis
- Washington H. Bolton, Memphis
- William L. Boyd Jr., Nashville
- Boyd, Whitworth, and Taylor, Nashville
- W. Bradford, Memphis
- Will Brooks, Virginia and Tennessee
- John Brown, Tennessee
- Edward Bush, Tennessee
- Stephen Cantrell, Nashville
- M. C. Cayce & Co. or M. C. Cayce & Son, Memphis
- John W. Chrisp, Memphis
- Benjamin W. S. Cabell, Knoxville
- Jason Chiborne & Co., Sweetwater Depot
- James Cook, Paris, Tennessee, and Mississippi
- William Cowan, Bedford County
- John Criddle, Virginia and Tennessee
- Clark Cummings, Clarksville, Tenn.
- A. J. Cunningham, Memphis
- Z. H. Curlin, Memphis
- Joseph W. "Joe" Dabbs, Nashville
- Dabbs & Porter, Nashville
- Samuel H. Davis, Nashville
- Anderson Delap, Memphis
- Nelson Delap, Memphis
- Norman Delap, Memphis
- Delap, Witherspoon & Fly, Memphis
- John A. Denie, Memphis
- Thomas Dickins, Memphis and St. Louis
- Richard Dillingham, alleged slave kidnapper (abolitionist?) in vicinity of Nashville
- Samuel W. Edmondson, Williamson County
- W. E. Eliot, Memphis
- Joseph Erwin, John Erwin, Abraham Wright, and Billings, and Joseph Thompson, possibly Samuel Spraggins, Tennessee and Louisiana
- Andrew Ewing, Nashville
- Alfred Flournoy, Tennessee and Louisiana
- Aaron H. Forrest, Memphis, and Vicksburg, Miss.
- Jeffrey E. Forrest, Memphis, and Vicksburg, Miss.
- Jesse A. Forrest, Memphis
- John N. Forrest, Memphis
- Nathan Bedford Forrest
- William H. Forrest, Memphis, and Vicksburg, Miss.
- S. and A. Fowlkes, Memphis
- David J. Gray, Williamson County
- Glover & Boyd, Nashville
- Goodbar, Tennessee and Montgomery, Ala.
- Henry Hall, Shelby Co., Tennessee, Kentucky, and Mississippi
- Jonathan Harding, Sumner Co., Tennessee, and Natchez
- E. S. Hawkins, Nashville
- Henry H. Haynes, Kentucky, and Nashville, Tenn.
- Peter Hickman, near Jonesboro, Tenn.
- Byrd Hill, Memphis and Mississippi
- Hill & Little, Memphis
- Hill & Powell, Memphis
- Hill, Weaver & Co., Memphis
- George W. Hitchings, Nashville and Sumner County
- J. M. Horton, Cleveland, Tenn.
- Andrew Jackson and John Hutchings, Nashville and Natchez
- Damascus G. James, Memphis
- David D. James, Nashville, Richmond, Va. and Natchez, Miss.
- John D. James, Nashville, Richmond, Va. and Natchez, Miss.
- Thomas G. James, Nashville, Richmond, Va. and Natchez, Miss.
- William G. James, Memphis
- James & Harrison, Nashville
- William Jenkins, Nashville
- Richard Johnson & Jesse Meek, Tennessee and Forks of the Road
- Alpha Kingsley, Nashville
- Latham & Farrell, Mouse Creek Depot (Niota)
- Latham & Howard, Mouse Creek Depot (Niota)
- T. D. Leonard, Clarksville
- Benjamin Little, Montgomery Little, Chauncey Little & William Little, Memphis and Shelbyville, Tenn.
- R. W. Lucas, Nashville
- Robert J. Lyles, Nashville
- Maddock, Tennessee
- Maddux and Dawson, Nashville
- Josiah Maples, Memphis
- William C. Mayfield, Pulaski
- Joseph Meek, Tennessee, Virginia and Mississippi
- A. A. McLean, Nashville
- James Miller, Richmond, Va. and East Tennessee
- James McMillin, Tennessee and Kentucky
- N. A. McNairy, Nashville and Natchez
- James S. Moffett, Troy, Tenn.
- J. W. Morton, Nashville
- Neil & Wright, Sweetwater Depot
- Isaac Neville, Memphis
- George N. Noel, Memphis
- Petway, middle Tennessee and lower Mississippi valley
- Phelps & Thornhill, Rutherford County
- G. L. Pierce, Nashville
- Rees W. Porter, Giles County and Nashville
- Dr. Joseph Powell, Elizabethton
- William Ramsey, Nashville and Virginia
- John Rath, Smith Co., Tenn.
- Dr. Ray, Tennessee (?) and Mississippi
- Redman, Mississippi and Tennessee
- John Reed, Tennessee and Mississippi
- Robertson & Currey (Duncan Robertson and Robert Currey), Nashville
- W. S. Rogers, Virginia, North Carolina, and Knoxville, Tenn.
- David Saffarans & Son (possibly, per Chase Mooney)
- Thomas G. Saunders, Nashville
- John Staples, Memphis
- L. E. Temple, Nashville
- Thompson, near Nashville, Tennessee
- Tom Tucker, Knoxville, Tenn.
- Vanhook, Tennessee
- A. Wallace, Memphis
- John D. Ware, Memphis and Brownsville
- Warwick, Nashville
- Webb, Nashville
- Webb, Merrill & Co., Nashville
- Frank Whiterspoon, Missouri and Tennessee
- John Wilkerson, Memphis
- Alexander Williams, Nashville
- Henry Williams, Nashville
- Williams & Glover, Nashville
- E. L. Willie, Memphis
- Jerry Wilson, Tennessee
- William Witherspoon, Memphis

== See also ==
- List of slave traders of the United States
- History of slavery in Tennessee
- List of Alabama slave traders
- List of District of Columbia slave traders
- List of Georgia and Florida slave traders
- List of Kentucky slave traders
- List of Maryland and Delaware slave traders
- List of Missouri slave traders
- Family separation in American slavery
- List of largest slave sales in the United States
- Movement to reopen the transatlantic slave trade
- Kidnapping into slavery in the United States
- Bibliography of the slave trade in the United States
- Slave markets and slave jails in the United States

== Sources ==
- Bancroft, Frederic (2023) [1931]. Slave Trading in the Old South. Southern Classics Series. Introduction by Michael Tadman. University of South Carolina Press. ISBN 978-1-64336-427-8.
- Carey, Bill (2018). Runaways, Coffles and Fancy Girls: A History of Slavery in Tennessee. Nashville, Tennessee: Clearbrook Press. ISBN 978-0-9725680-4-3. LCCN 2018903570. OCLC 1045068878.
- Clark, T. D. (December 1934). "The Slave Trade between Kentucky and the Cotton Kingdom". The Mississippi Valley Historical Review. 21 (3). Urbana, Illinois: Mississippi Valley Historical Association: 331–342. doi:10.2307/1897378. ISSN 0161-391X. JSTOR 1897378. OCLC 35781793.
- Colby, Robert K. D. (2024). An Unholy Traffic: Slave Trading in the Civil War South. Oxford University Press. doi:10.1093/oso/9780197578261.001.0001. ISBN 978-0-19-757828-5. LCCN 2023053721. OCLC 1412042395.
- Goodstein, Anita Shafer (1989). Nashville, 1780–1860: From Frontier to City. Gainesville: University of Florida Press. ISBN 978-0-8130-0940-7. LCCN 89033186. OCLC 19669897.
- Hedrick, Charles Embury (1927). Social and Economic Aspects of Slavery in the Transmontane Prior to 1850. George Peabody College for Teachers. Contributions to education.no. 46. Nashville, Tennessee: George Peabody College for Teachers.
- Jones-Rogers, Stephanie E. (2019). They Were Her Property: White Women as Slave Owners in the American South. New Haven, Connecticut: Yale University Press. ISBN 978-0-300-21866-4.
- Little, Thomas Vance (Spring 1989). "Slavery in Williamson County" (PDF). Williamson County Historical Journal. 20. Franklin, Tennessee: 101–129. LCCN 86642787. OCLC 14186085.
- Mooney, Chase C. (1971) [1957]. "Chapter Two: Hire, Sale, Theft and Flight of Slaves". Slavery in Tennessee. Westport, Conn.: Negro Universities Press. pp. 29–63.
- Phillips, Ulrich B. (1966) [1918]. American Negro Slavery: A Survey of the Supply, Employment and Control of Negro Labor as Determined by the Plantation Regime (Reprint ed.). Baton Rouge: Louisiana State University Press. ISBN 978-0807101094. LCCN 66031730. OCLC 4969724. OL 13992719M.
- Roberts, Kevin D. (2003). Slaves and Slavery in Louisiana: The Evolution of Atlantic World Identities, 1791–1831 (Thesis). University of Texas at Austin.
- Stowe, Harriet Beecher (1853). A key to Uncle Tom's cabin: presenting the original facts and documents upon which the story is founded. Boston: J. P. Jewett & Co. LCCN 02004230. OCLC 317690900. OL 21879838M.
