= Natchez slave market =

Natchez, Mississippi, U.S. (~1790s–1860s)

Coordinates: 31°33′21″N 91°23′03″W

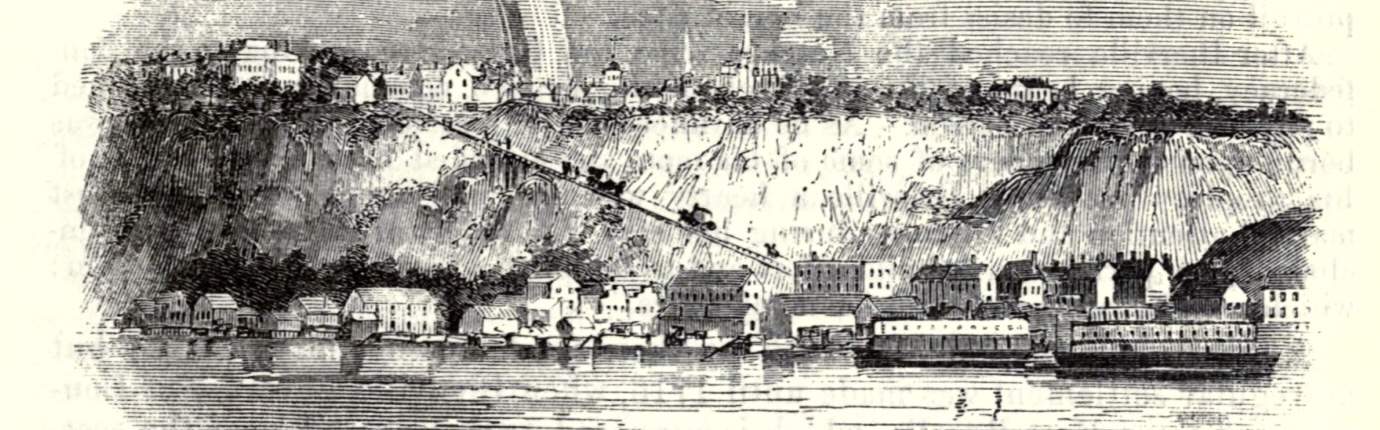
"Western view of Natchez" (published 1861) by John Warner Barber

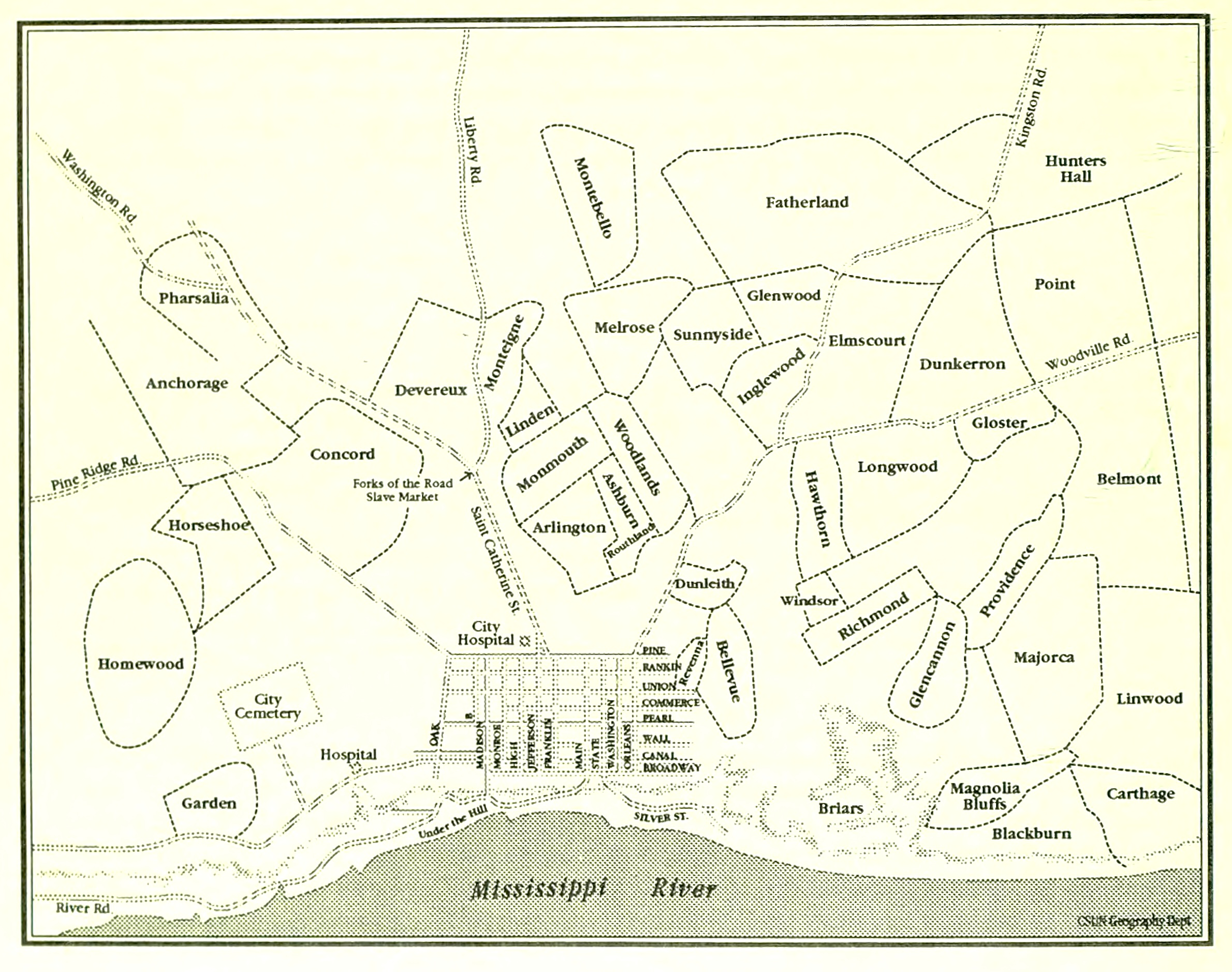
Forks of the Road and Natchez-Under-the-Hill pictured in "Illustration F: Suburban Estates — c. 1830 to 1860" from The Black Experience in Natchez: 1720-1880, Special History Study by Ronald L. F. Davis (1993)

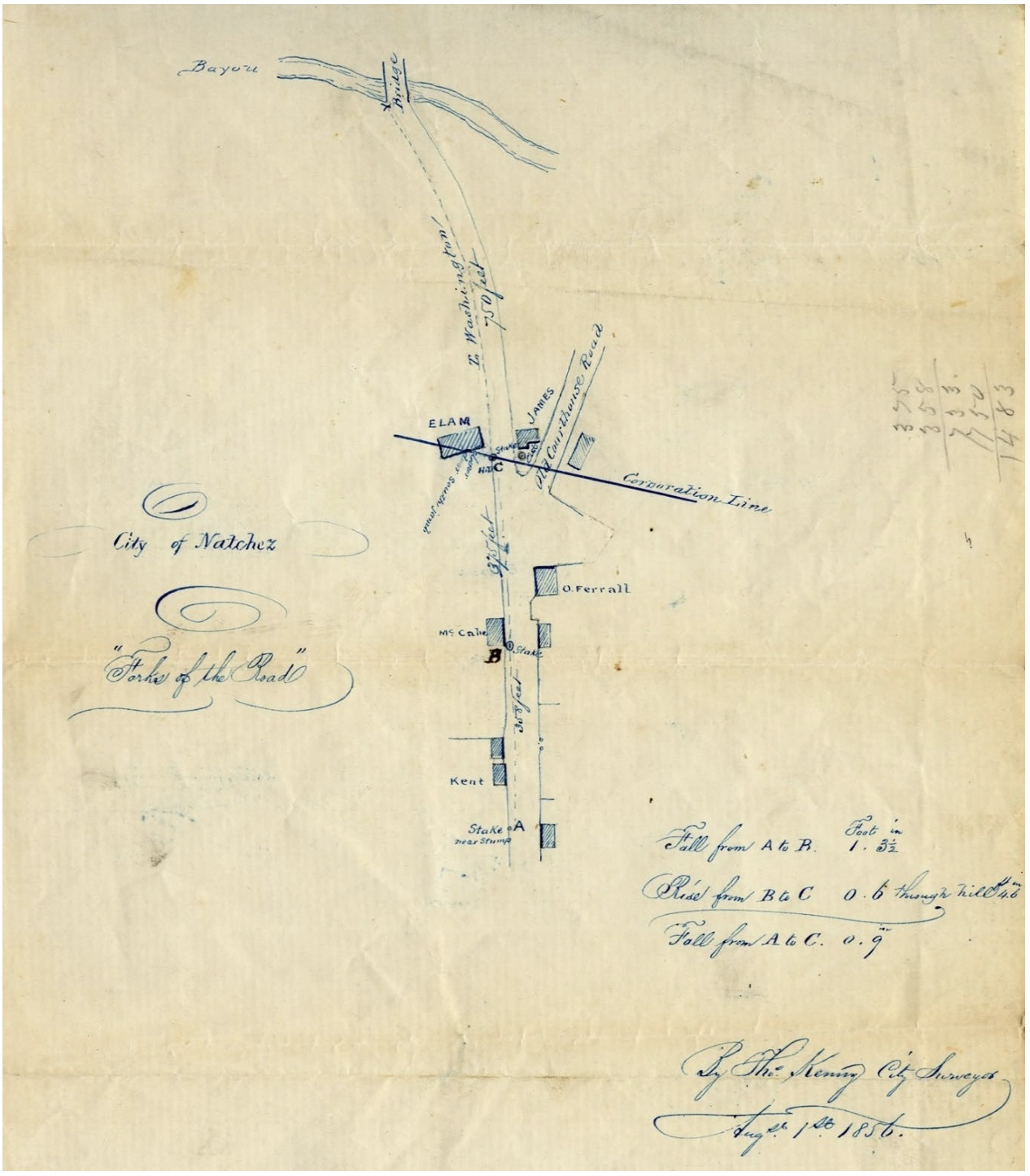
Survey of Forks of the Road, August 1, 1856, by Thos. Kenny, Natchez City Surveyor (Mississippi Department of Archives and History Series 2051)

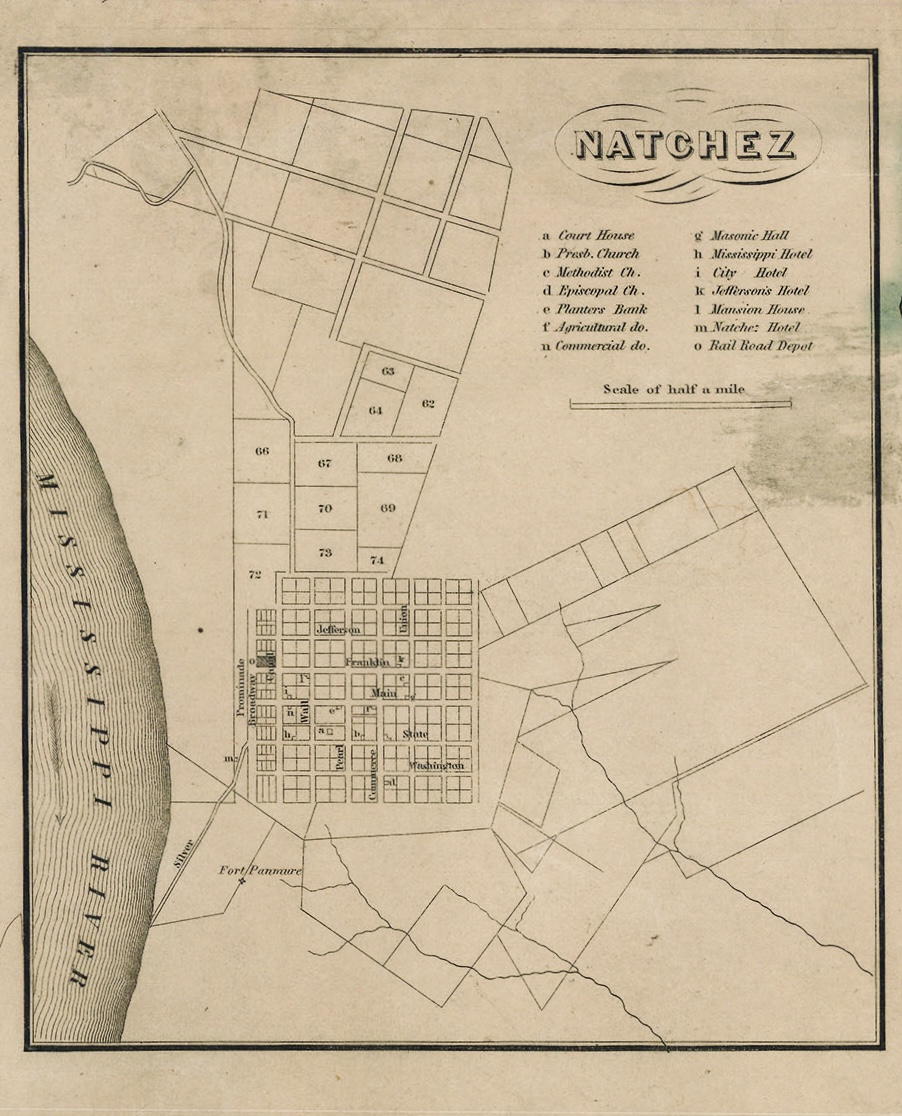
Natchez, Mississippi c. 1839

The Natchez slave market was a slave market in Natchez, Mississippi, in the United States. Slaves were originally sold throughout the area, including along the Natchez Trace that connected the settlement with Nashville, along the Mississippi River at Natchez-Under-the-Hill, and throughout town. From 1833 to 1863, the Forks of the Road slave market was located about a mile from downtown Natchez at the intersection of Liberty Road and Washington Road, which has since been renamed to D'Evereux Drive in one direction and St. Catherine Street in the other. The market differed from many other slave sellers of the day by offering individuals on a first-come first-serve basis rather than selling them at auction, either singly or in lots. At one time the Forks of the Road was the second-largest slave market in the United States, trailing only New Orleans. The cluster of slave depots at the Forks of the Road was contemptuously called Niggerville as early as 1836 and as late as 1860.

== History ==
The Forks of the Road slave market dates to the 18th century; slave sales in vicinity of Natchez, Mississippi were primarily at the riverboat landings in the 1780s but the widespread use of the Natchez Trace from Nashville beginning in the 1790s shifted the market inland to the Forks of the Road "located on the Trace at the northeast edge of the upper town." In the Mississippi Territory days there were slave markets at Natchez, Bruinsburg, and Selsertown. A visitor in 1808, when it was Mississippi Territory, wrote, "The gentlemen pass their time in the pursuit of three things: all make love; most of them play; and a few make money. With religion they have nothing to do; having formed a treaty with her, the principal article of which is, 'Trouble not us, nor will we trouble you.'" He counted 80-odd flatboats tied up at the landing that day and wrote, "The river is about one mile broad at this place, and one hundred feet deep. From the brow of the hills before mentioned, you discover small fleets arriving daily, which keep up the hurry and bustle on the flats or levee below; while at the same time you see detachments continually dropping off for New Orleans, and the slaves breaking up the hulks of those that have discharged their cargoes, in order to make room for the new comers." He also described the comparative rarity of ocean-going ships making the slow, meandering trip upriver from New Orleans, but he did describe encountering a brig at Fausse Riviere that was bringing a cargo of slaves up to at Natchez. He also wrote of a musical band of about 40 "Choctaw, Natchez, and Muskogee" who sang and played instruments to greet the boatmen and earn money and provisions, the common presence of "spotted tiger, or leopard skins" harvested in the area, wild horses living on the west side of the river, and the works of the Moundbuilders, "some of which are round, others oval, but most of them square, with a small platform on the top. Some of these have been opened, and a single skeleton discovered near the top."

In the years immediately following the War of 1812, the most active slave markets in the South were at Algiers, Louisiana, and Natchez, Mississippi. In the late teens, sales were held near St. Catherine's Toll Bridge over St. Catherine's Creek near what later was called Pharsalia Race Course.

One traveler visiting the city in 1817 reported "fourteen flatboats loaded with Negroes for sale there." William Wells Brown, who accompanied a slave shipment to Natchez in roughly the 1828 to 1832 window of time, reported that there was a warehouse at the boat landing for temporarily storing newly arrived slaves while the pens were further inland, up the cliff and in or near town; he also described stopping to sell slaves at the village of Rodney, which had been known as Petit Gulf until 1828.

In 1833, in response to fears of contagion stoked by the 1833 cholera epidemic, several traders signed a public letter agreeing to permanently move the slaves for sale in Natchez outside of the city limits. Prior to this, slave sales were held several places around the settlement, including at the boat landing and on the front steps of the Mansion House. According to an Alabama newspaper, the move was the consequence of Isaac Franklin (of Franklin and Armfield Office and Fairvue Plantation) dumping the bodies of several enslaved cholera victims (including a teenage girl and an eight-month-old baby, who had been shipped south from Alexandria, Virginia) into a ravine or bayou near town. (This ravine may have been the one described 10 years earlier by a local doctor describing the town's deadly 1823 yellow fever outbreak: "Below the old fort, and in the gorge between the two hills, have been deposited all the animals that have died in and about the city, all the trash, offal, and stable dirt of the city, making a Golgotha—a hot-bed of pestilence and death.") The signers of the letter were just a fraction of the 32 "non-resident slave merchants" selling in Natchez that year, who collectively reported US$238,879 (equivalent to $7,969,498 in 2025) in taxable revenue.

A visitor from New England to Natchez in 1834, the novelist J. H. Ingraham, reported that "elopements, sickness, deaths, and an expanding cotton belt created a continuous demand for slaves, and that Kentucky and Virginia marts supplied this demand. Ingraham observed that river boats landing in the ports of Natchez and New Orleans nearly always brought a cargo of slaves. During the year 1834, the New Englander estimated that more than 4,000 slaves passed through the 'crossroads' market one mile out of Natchez." According to Frederic Bancroft in Slave-Trading in the Old South (1931), "The chief market, about 1834, was described as 'a cluster of rough wooden buildings, in the angle of two roads,' a mile from Natchez. There were also four or five other pens in the vicinity, 'where several hundred slaves of all ages, colors and conditions, of both sexes, were exposed for sale.' At that time, Natchez had a population of about 3,000, a majority of whom were colored; and about as many slaves as the entire white population of the little city were annually sold in or near it."

William T. Martin, who had been a county lawyer nearby, and who became an in-house attorney for Franklin & Ballard, and still later a politician and Confederate general, told Bancroft around the turn of the century: "In some years there were three or four thousand slaves here. I think that I have seen as many as 600 or 800 in the market at one time. There were usually four or five large traders at Natchez every winter. Each had from fifty to several hundred negroes, and most of them received fresh lots during the season. They brought their large gangs late in the fall and sold them out by May. Then they went back for more. They built three large three-story buildings, where several hundred could be accommodated." According to an account published in 1909, "The Slave Market near Natchez, was about a mile from the town—a court yard surrounded by low buildings. The negroes for sale were dressed in black fur hats, roundabouts and trousers of corduroy velvet, good vests, strong shoes and white cotton shirts. The females were dressed in neat calico frocks, white aprons and capes, and fancy kerchiefs."

Forks of the Road appears in Harriet Beecher Stowe's non-fiction polemical A Key to Uncle Tom's Cabin (1853), in a chapter on the ubiquity of family separation in the domestic slave trade, in which she disputes a Virginian's claim that it was rare to separate families, in the rare cases that slaves were sold to traders at all:

We take up the Natchez (Mississippi) Courier of Nov. 20th, 1852, and there read: NEGROES. The undersigned would respectfully state to the public that he has leased the stand in the Forks of the Road, near Natchez, for a term of years, and that he intends to keep a large lot of NEGROES on land during the year. He will sell as low or lower than any other trader at this place or in New Orleans. He has just arrived from Virginia with a very likely lot of Field Men and Women; also, House Servants, three Cooks, and a Carpenter. Call and see. A fine Buggy Horse, a Saddle Horse, and a Carryall, on hand, and for sale. Thos. G. James. Where in the world did this lucky Mr. Thos. G. James get this likely Virginia "assortment"?

The Forks-of-the-Road slave market was demolished in 1863 by U.S. Army troops who recycled the lumber into barracks for themselves and self-emancipated people known as "contraband." In 2021 the site was made one of four sites comprising the Natchez National Historical Park.

Sexton's records for Natchez show that in addition to the Forks of the Road there were a group of traders at Natchez Under the Hill. Natchez-Under-the-Hill was a rowdy port famous for its debauchery. According to one visitor in 1822, "At the foot of the bluff is a small river bottom, along which are built a range of houses where the Prince of Darkness is, I believe, the only acknowledged superior. It is without exception, the most infamous place I ever saw—where villainy, hardened by long impunity, triumphs in open day."

== Traders ==
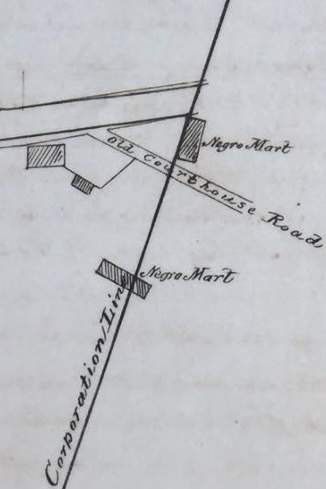
Negro marts labeled on an 1854 map of the Forks of the Road

List of traders known to sell at Natchez:

- Robert B. Brashear
- Benjamin Eaton
- R. H. Elam
- Isaac Franklin of Franklin and Armfield Office and Isaac Franklin Plantation
- Griffin & Pullum
- Hitchens & Colco (?)
- John D. James, Thomas G. James, David D. James (brothers)
- John O'Ferrall - when selling out in 1857, he claimed the rental income from his slave depot was US$1,000 (equivalent to $34,554 in 2025) annually
- Woodroof & Hundley
- Matthews, Branton & Co.
- John T. Hatcher
- Rowan & Harris
- John P. Phillips

== See also ==
- Slave markets and slave jails in the United States
- Natchez Trace and Natchez Trace Parkway
- Hamburg, South Carolina slave market
- New Orleans slave market
- Richmond, Virginia slave market
- Nashville, Tennessee slave market
- Andrew Jackson and the slave trade in the United States
