= List of Missouri and Arkansas slave traders =

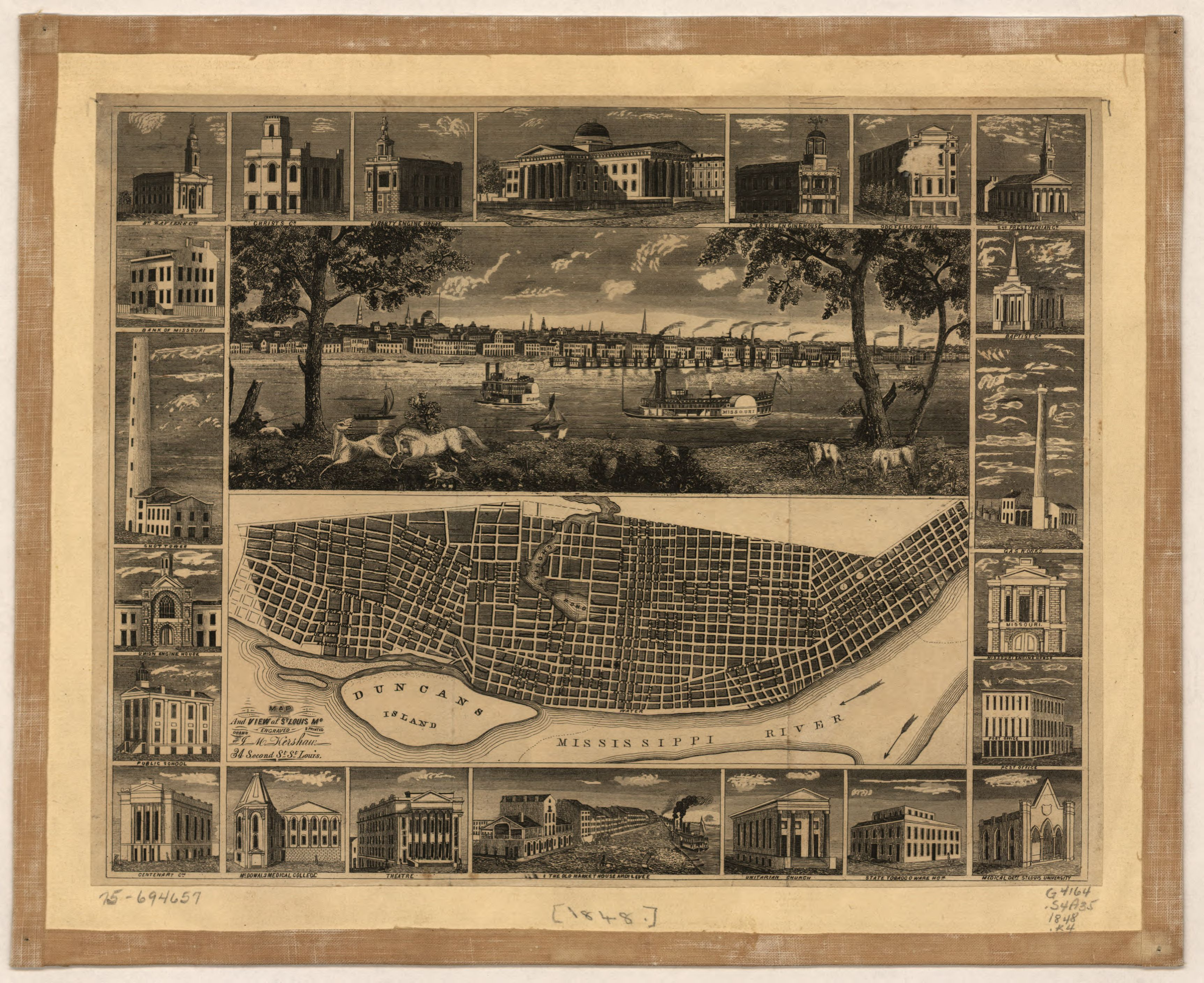
Map and view of St. Louis, 1848

This is a list of slave traders working in Missouri and Arkansas from settlement until 1865. The slave trade in Arkansas was comparatively small and developed relatively "late" in the antebellum era, such that "Like most areas of the state, neither Pope nor Conway County had an organized slave market. No existing county or court records, letters, or other documents mention slave dealers or firms routinely in the area, though small traveling dealers may have passed through western Arkansas, leaving no identifiable traces of their activities."

- Jim Adams, Missouri and New Orleans
- Atkinson & Richardson, Tennessee, Kentucky, and St. Louis, Mo.
- Reuben Bartlett, St. Louis, Mo. and Nashville
- Henry Beck, St. Louis
- Birch & Keary, St. Louis, Mo.
- William T. Bridgford, St. Louis
- Thomas Brindley, St. Louis
- Brown & Taylor, Missouri and Vicksburg, Miss.
- David Clayton, St. Louis
- J. H. Darneal, Independence, Mo.
- George P. Dorris, Platte County, Mo. and Louisiana
- Jim Elerson, Missouri and Arkansas
- John Farley, St. Louis
- Thomas Fawcett
- J. D. Fitzgerald, Little Rock
- Patrick Foley, St. Louis
- Francis Frederick, St. Louis
- W. H. Gwin, St. Louis and Virginia
- Philip Hart, St. Louis
- Wash Henson, Dallas County
- John D. James, Missouri, Tennessee, Mississippi, Louisiana, etc.
- Thomas Johnson, Cape Girardeau
- William Johnson, St. Louis, Mo.
- Curtis Kennedy, St. Louis
- Riley S. Kennedy, St. Louis
- Bernard M. Lynch, St. Louis
- Matlock, St. Louis and Texas
- John Mattingly, Louisville, Ky. and St. Louis, Mo.
- Alfred B. McAfee, St. Louis, Mo.
- McAfee & Blakey, St. Louis
- John McDonald, St. Louis
- James Maguire, St. Louis
- Henry A. Meyer, St. Louis
- Henry Mispal, St. Louis
- Thomas Norton, St. Louis
- Peter Norvey, St. Louis
- Herman Peter, St. Louis
- R. W. Sinclair, Audrain County
- Asa B. Smith, St. Louis
- M. Talbert, Liberty, Mo.
- Thomson, Little Rock
- Corbin Thompson, St. Louis, Mo.
- Patrick Tuthill
- Walker
- William Walker, St. Louis
- Samuel Wells, St. Louis
- John Wheelan, Rolla, Mo.
- White, Lexington, Mo.
- James White, Platte City (?)
- John R. White, St. Louis and New Orleans
- William White, St. Louis
- Wright, St. Joseph, Mo.

== See also ==
- History of slavery in Missouri
- List of slave traders of the United States

== Sources ==
- Bancroft, Frederic (2023) [1931]. Slave Trading in the Old South. Southern Classics Series. Introduction by Michael Tadman. University of South Carolina Press. ISBN 978-1-64336-427-8.
- Colby, Robert K. D. (2024). An Unholy Traffic: Slave Trading in the Civil War South. Oxford University Press. doi:10.1093/oso/9780197578261.001.0001. ISBN 9780197578285. LCCN 2023053721. OCLC 1412042395.
- Fitzpatrick, Benjamin Lewis (December 2008). Negroes for Sale: The Slave Trade in Antebellum Kentucky (Ph.D. thesis). University of Notre Dame. doi:10.7274/pn89d50750n.
- Hedrick, Charles Embury (1927). Social and Economic Aspects of Slavery in the Transmontane Prior to 1850. Nashville, Tennessee: George Peabody College for Teachers.
- Stowe, Harriet Beecher (1853). A key to Uncle Tom's cabin: presenting the original facts and documents upon which the story is founded. Boston: J. P. Jewett & Co. LCCN 02004230. OCLC 317690900. OL 21879838M.
- Wong, Edlie L. (2009). "The Gender of Freedom before Dred Scott". Neither Fugitive nor Free: Atlantic Slavery, Freedom Suits, and the Legal Culture of Travel. Vol. 8. NYU Press. pp. 127–182. ISBN 978-0-8147-9455-5. JSTOR j.ctt9qgbb3.7.
- Brown, W. Wells (1847). Narrative of William W. Brown, a Fugitive Slave. No. 25 Cornhill, Boston: The Anti-Slavery Office. hdl:loc.gdc/scd0001.00118369671. LCCN 14004708. OCLC 2382316. OL 16611228W. - Also digitized by UNC's Documenting the American South project. This article incorporates text from this source, which is in the public domain.
