= Fancy girl =

African-American sex slaves

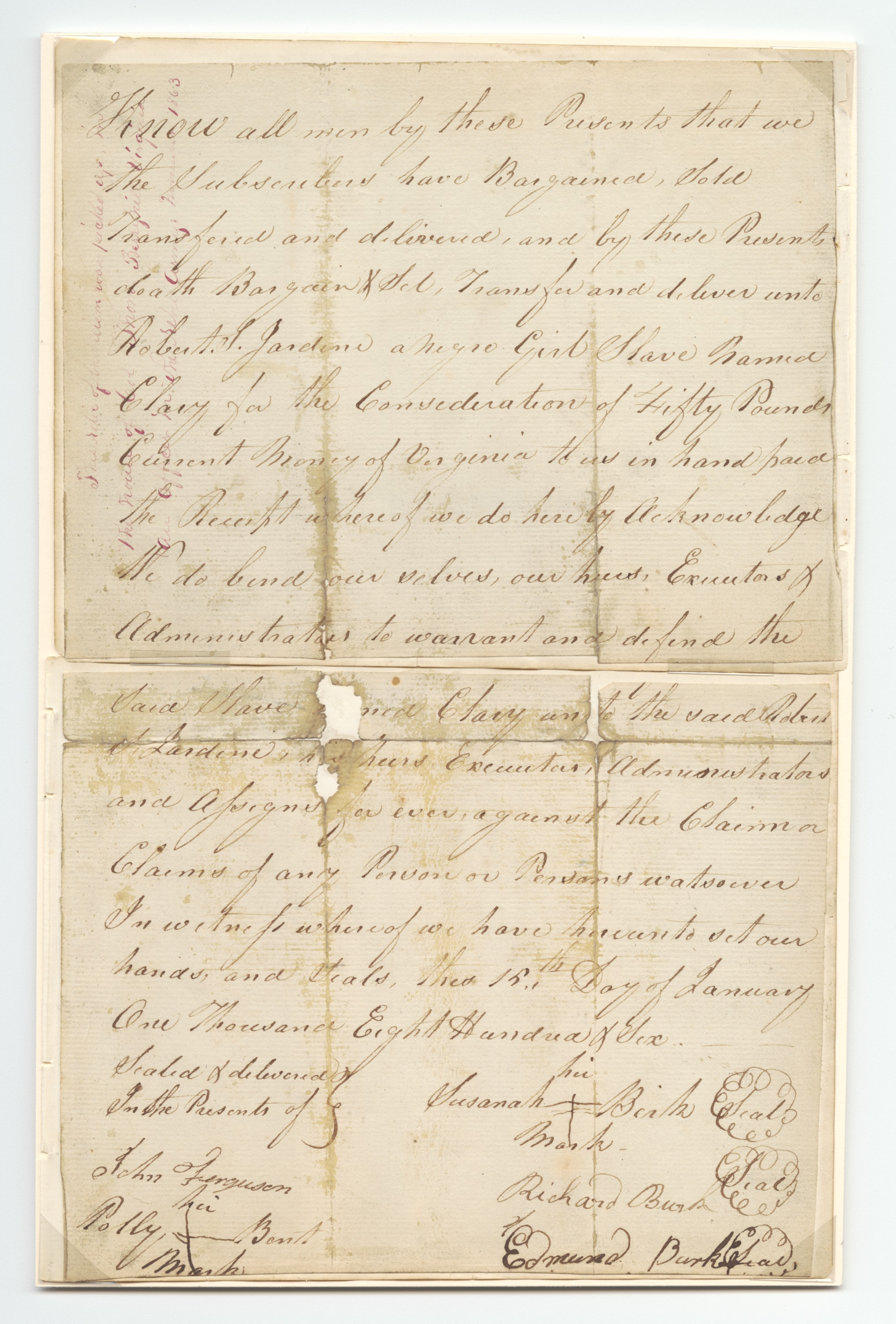
1806 bill of sale for a girl, Clary, purchased by Robert Jardine for 50 pounds

A fancy girl, sometimes called a fancy maid, was a young woman or girl of African descent with a lighter complexion sold with the intent of forced prostitution and concubinage. This sale was often referred to as the fancy trade within the larger history of slavery in the United States. At least one American slave trader also advertised fancy boys for sale.

== History ==
Fancy girls were purchased and sold within the southern United States by slave traders such as Rice C. Ballard and Robert Jardine. The young women were often sold at auctions with other enslaved people, though they were kept in separate quarters from them. It was common for the fancy girl to be sold in New Orleans markets at prices much higher than the average enslaved person was sold for. One bill of sale for a young woman named Clary declared she was purchased for fifty pounds, or nearly $5,000 in modern currency. Another example of the comparative sales value of enslaved Americans sold for sexual exploitation appears in Joseph Erwin's slave sales of 1818: three prime-age male field hands, Hooper, Sam, and Peter, were sold for $1,250, $1,250, and $1,500, while a Dominie DeVerbois paid $1,800 for "A quadroon, Chloe, aged twelve and warranted a slave for life".

Advertisements for fancy girls often characterized them as "smart", "honest", or "temperate"; and they were often decorated in nice clothing and accessories when sent to sale. Preconceived notions of black women as being promiscuous contributed to slaveowners' motivations for purchase and their wives' disdain for the enslaved women. The young women were kept either in their own quarters of the home or in a special building on the slave owner's property, as to not draw attention. Information about fancy girls' time enslaved is limited; more is known about their lives before the sale and after their freedom.

Nashville slave trader Rees W. Porter advertised "extra No. 1 Fancy Boys" of 10 and 12 years old.

== Notable fancy girls ==
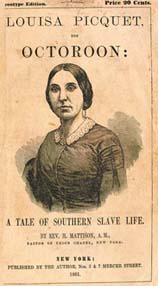
Louisa Picquet

Avenia White and Susan Johnson were purchased by Rice C. Ballard in 1832 and kept on his plantation for many years. Their importance to Ballard is highlighted by continuous time spent living on his property, often traveling with him during repeated moves. The two women both had children and their births were logged in Ballard's personal records, signifying their importance to him.

Eventually, the pair were freed by Ballard and moved to Cincinnati in 1838, where they spent the remainder of their lives. Ballard moved the women and their children to the city himself, traveling in the same train car and sleeping in the same lodging room with the women. At the time, Cincinnati held a large population with previously enslaved women and their mixed children, and functioned as somewhat of a safe-haven for those in situations similar to White and Johnson. White continued to write Ballard after her empancipation, updating him on her life or requesting assistance from him. Ballard continued to visit the women semi-often on "business".

Louisa Piquet was 14 years old in 1841 when she was separated from her mother and sold at auction at a slave market in Mobile. John Williams purchased her for $1,500. By her own account, she was instructed to undress immediately after her purchase so that Williams would be assured that his purchase was worth it.

Piquet was born into slavery, and was not originally sold as a fancy girl, but claims she and her mother endured sexual abuse at the hands of their previous owners. She lived with Williams for six years, bearing four of his children and taking care of him until his death. He bequeathed Piquet all of the furniture in his house and gave her and her children freedom. Williams encouraged her to move to New York, but she decided to move to Cincinnati since she had friends or relatives there.

== See also ==
- Female slavery in the United States
- History of sexual slavery in the United States
- Enslaved women's resistance in the United States and Caribbean
- Suicide, infanticide, and self-mutilation by slaves in the United States
- History of concubinage in the Muslim world
- Plaçage
- Edmonson sisters
- Comfort women
