= Rees W. Porter =

American slave trader (1809–1892)

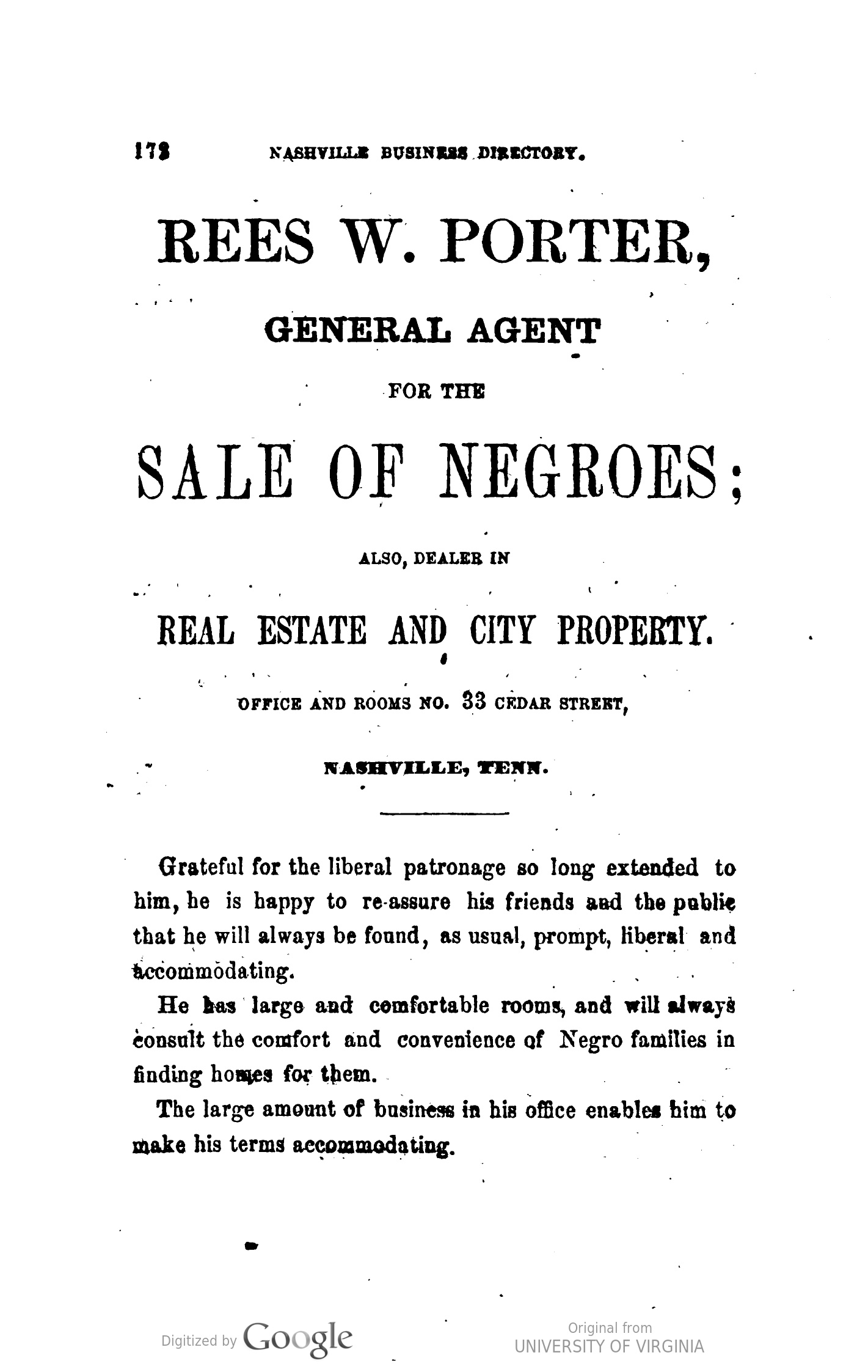
- Rees W. Porter, general agent for the sale of negroes, 33 Cedar street (Nashville business directory, 1857)
- Born: October 30, 1809; Russellville, Kentucky
- Died: November 11, 1892; West Columbia, Texas

Rees Whitsitt Porter (October 30, 1809 – November 11, 1892) was a slave trader in Nashville, Tennessee in the 1850s. At one time he worked out of 33 Cedar St., now the site of the landmark Morris Memorial Building. He was a partner with Joseph W. Dabbs in the firm Dabbs & Porter. He had a full page ad in the 1857 Nashville city directory. Porter was the author of what have been described as "some of the more disturbing newspaper advertisements in Tennessee history," listing for sale "extra No. 1, Fancy Boy, 10 years old," "No. 1 Fancy Girl" (as distinct from "several House Girls"), and "1 very pretty Girl, 13 years old."

Porter moved to Texas in the late 1870s, settling in Brazoria County where his son lived and worked as a doctor.

== Early life ==
R. W. Porter was born on October 30, 1809, to Reese Porter and Sarah Whitsitt, who were married before March 1805 in the Cumberland Presbyterian Church. One account holds that Porter's birthplace was in Christian County, Kentucky. Rees Jr. married Elizabeth McLaurine. They had five children together, Robert Rees Porter; Elizabeth, who married Sweeny; Samuel Porter, who married a widow named McAulay, born Blakey; William Porter; and Margaret Porter.

== Career ==
In May 1850 he was appointed a county delegate to the forthcoming Southern Commercial Convention to be held in Nashville. In August 1850, when he was about 40 years old, Porter listed for sale his farm in Middle Tennessee, which he listed as "a good stock or cotton farm...containing about seven hundred acres, four hundred of which is in cleared, lying 7 miles North of Pulaski, good neighborhood. The land is good, water excellent, price low and terms easy." He was appointed to be an assistant marshal for the taking of the seventh U.S. census in Giles County. At the time of the enumeration of November 5, 1850, Porter lived with his wife and children in Giles County, Tennessee, worked as a farmer and reported that he owned real estate valued at $10,000. As of 1851 he was a member of the Whig Party.

Porter seems to have entered the slave trade by 1852, as reported in 1888 by a Chicago Times writer retelling the history of Nashville's old slave mart at the time of its demolition:

In 1852 the rear of the building was fitted up as a slave market. The slave pen was of brick, two stories in height, and the windows were heavily grated. The floors extended under the bricks in the wall to prevent the possibility of escape by tearing up the floor. There was an outside court about forty feet square, the pen being located in the middle. The style of the firm running this slave market was Dabbs, Porter & Co. The individual members of the firm were Joe Dabbs, Reese W. Porter and H. H. Haines. George W. Hitchings, who was a son-in-law of Jesse Johnson, was afterward connected with the firm. Of these Haines and Dabbs long since joined the silent majority. George W. Hitchings died in Texas a number of years ago, and Reese Porter, the only one of the quartette who is alive, is now in Texas.

Porter was advertising his slave-trading services in Tennessee in 1853, two years before the (unenforced) ban on importing slaves across state lines for resale was lifted. He was partners with Joe Dabbs and their advertisement stated that they had "associated themselves together for the purpose of carrying on GENERAL AGENCY BUSINESS, in the buying and selling of NEGROES. We can at all times be found at our office, No 33, Cedar Street, between Cherry and Summer, where we have erected safe and comfortable quarters for keeping any number of Negroes; and those wishing to sell, may be assured of getting the highest market price, as we will either buy on our own account or sell on commission for others. We pledge ourselves to obey instructions, and especially to be particular in selecting good homes for favorite servants, without separating families." The same advertisement stated that Porter was based in Giles County, Tennessee while Dabbs was the firm's representative in Nashville proper.

In 1854 Porter paid to be listed as a slave dealer of Nashville in the Southern Business Directory of Charleston, South Carolina. Porter advertised that he had "fancy girls" for sale; these were young, light-skinned enslaved girls sold for purposes of sexual exploitation. In 1855 he listed for sale John, Henry, Julia, Ellen, Sarah, Jerry, and Green, in order to execute a deed in trust. In 1856 Porter wrote one of the letters that was pillaged by journalist James Redpath from Ziba B. Oakes' slave jail after the fall of Charleston during the American Civil War and now held in the special collections of Boston Public Library. Porter was inquiring about prices for "small negroes" specifically girls aged nine to 14, "plough boys," "women with one & two children," and young women. He reported that Brown & Bulger, a slave-trading firm based in Montgomery, Alabama was sending him a collection of people that met that description and he was interested in buying from Charleston as well if the price was right. Porter's frequent newspaper advertisements listed "fancy girls" and "fancy boys" for sale, describing their appearances and specifying very young ages, which researcher Bill Carey argues means that "children were publicly and regularly sold for the sex trade two blocks west of the Davidson County Courthouse, and two blocks east of the Tennessee State Capitol."

By 1857 Porter had moved out of the 33 Cedar street address—replaced there by H. H. Haynes and partners—but still listed "negroes at auction" for sale in the Nashville Banner in 1857. At the time of the 1860 U.S. census Porter was a resident of Davidson County, Tennessee; he listed his occupation as "trader."

After the American Civil War he was one of several men who recommended that Andrew Johnson pardon J. B. McFerrin for his rebel activities; McFerrin had been disqualified from the blanket amnesty because his net worth was more than US$20,000 (equivalent to $439,773 in 2025).

== Texas ==
Porter's son, Robert Rees Porter, served as a surgeon to Texas regiments of the Confederate States Army during the American Civil War. In 1878 Porter was pickpocketed while traveling by train from Houston. Porter moved from Tennessee to Texas in 1879. At the time of the 1880 U.S. census R. W. Porter lived with his son, R. R. Porter, a physician, in what is now called the East Columbia Historic District of Brazoria County, Texas. They lived near Main Street and Duval, adjacent to the landmarked James Price Phillips Home, which "was where the first hospital was built in Texas for the soldiers in the Texas Revolution. It was also the site of the first cloth manufacturing in Texas. Mrs. Porter made cloth for the soldiers of the Columbia Company." Porter died in 1892, in Columbia, Texas, at the age of 83.

== See also ==
- Family separation in American slavery
- List of Tennessee slave traders
