= Isaac Neville =

American slave trader (1819?–1878)

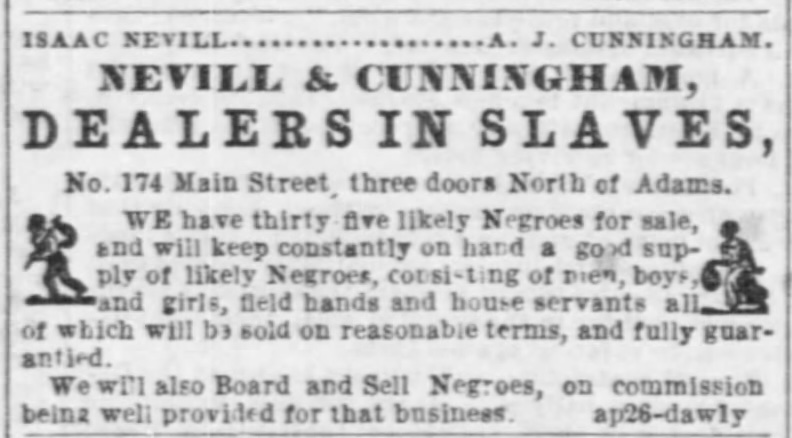
- Nevill & Cunningham, Memphis Daily Appeal, Memphis, Tenn., May 2, 1857
- Born: Unknown, possibly 1819; Unknown, possibly Mississippi
- Died: Likely 1878; Likely Tennessee
- Occupation: Slave trader
- Years active: 1850s

Isaac Neville (possibly about 1819 – possibly 1878), also known as Ike Neville, sometimes spelled Nevil or Nevill, was an American slave trader based in Memphis, Tennessee in the United States.

== Biography ==
Neville was possibly born in Mississippi to parents originally from North Carolina. He may have been a resident of Marshall, Mississippi in 1845.

His partners, at various times, were Andrew J. Cunningham, Damascus G. James, and William M. James. In 1857, Neville & Cunningham was one of "more than a dozen" slave trading concerns advertising in the city. Research into the health of enslaved people in Memphis, including those trafficked by the city's slave traders, found that "Mortality reports reveal there was much fictitious boasting about 'healthy' enslaved people who arrived in Memphis...[in 1857] a 14-year-old boy owned by established slave traders Neville and Cunningham died from 'lung fever.' The long travel between states was deadly for many children, and names were never given...Environmental factors (such as cold weather, high humidity, poor ventilation, unsanitary privies), and the social conditions of city life were risk factors for high mortality rates. For slave traders, the goal was to obtain Blacks for enslavement, trade, sell and make a profit. The reality was that many enslaved people were not examined carefully for 'healthiness'."

Isaac Neville was the listed owner of 212 and 214 Main Street in Memphis in 1877 when that structure was set on fire by an arsonist. A building that had once housed Ike Neville's slave jail was still standing in April 1921, when it was described as "a three-story brick building standing on the north of Adams, west of alley, between Main and Second streets. For many years prior to the war this was one of the important slave markets of the city." A building of similar description had been depicted in the Memphis Appeal of 1907 as Nathan Bedford Forrest's old mart, but Forrest's slave jail was between Second and Third.

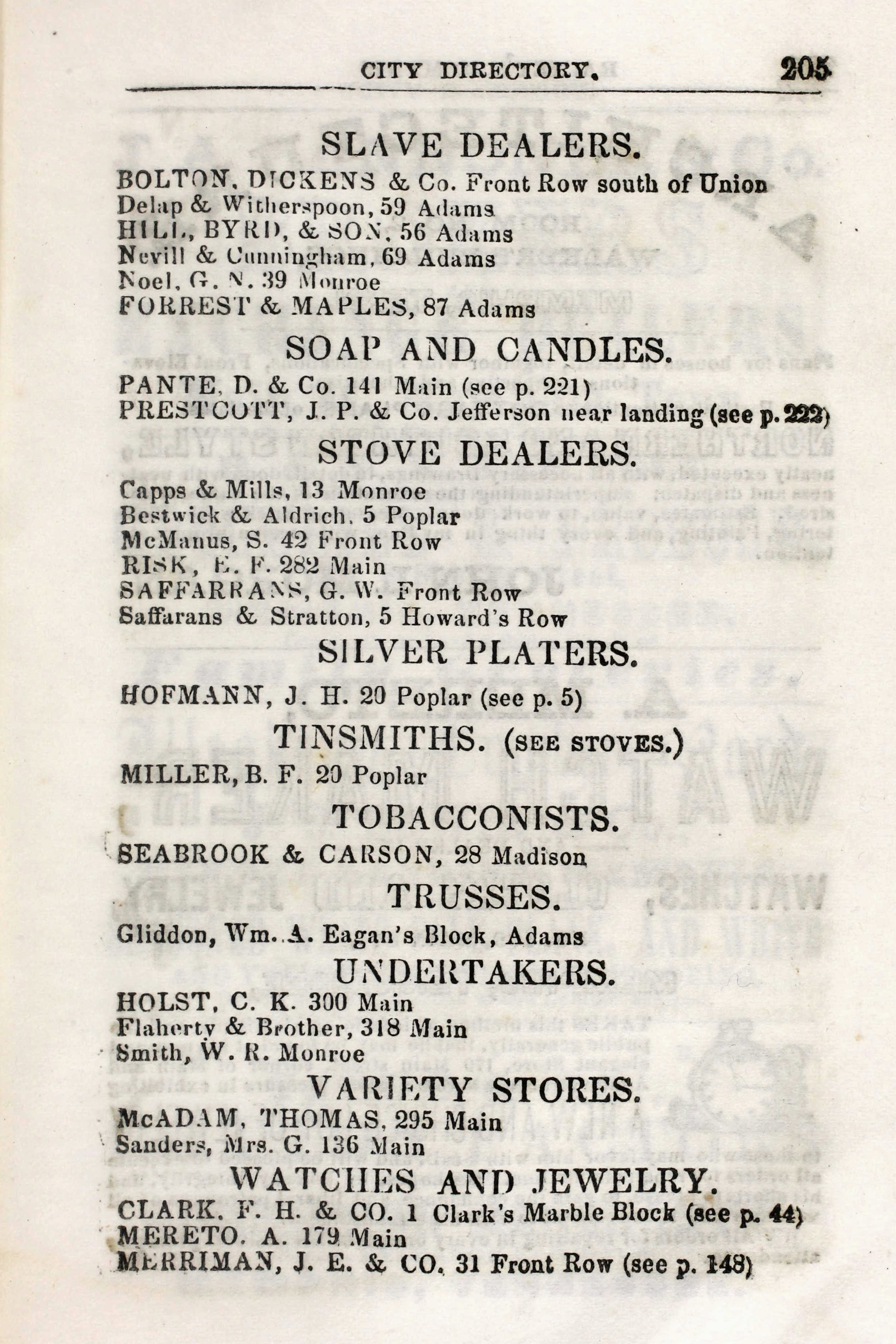
Slave dealers listed in the 1855 directory of Memphis, Tennessee including Bolton & Dickens, Nathan Bedford Forrest, Neville & Cunningham, and Byrd Hill

Neville likely died in Tennessee in 1878.

== See also ==
- List of Tennessee slave traders
- History of slavery in Tennessee
- History of Memphis, Tennessee
