= History of slavery in Missouri =

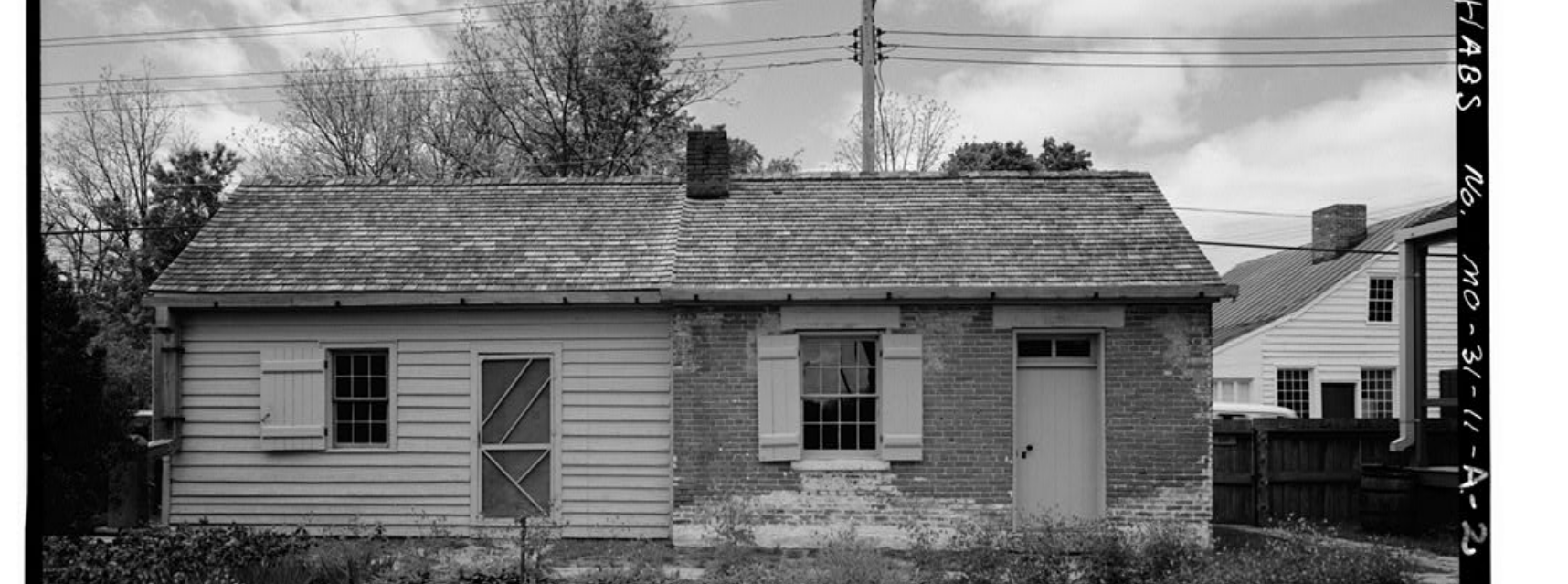
Felix & Odile Pratt Valle slave quarters, southeast corner of Merchant & Second Streets, Sainte Genevieve, Missouri

The history of slavery in Missouri began in 1720, predating statehood, with the large-scale slavery in the region, when French merchant Philippe François Renault forced about 500 enslaved people of African descent from Saint-Domingue up the Mississippi River to work in lead mines in what is now southeastern Missouri and southern Illinois. These were the first enslaved Africans brought in masses to the middle Mississippi River Valley. Prior to Renault's enterprise, slavery in Missouri under French colonial rule had a much smaller scale compared to elsewhere in the French colonies. Immediately prior to the American Civil War, there were about 100,000 enslaved people in Missouri, about half of whom lived in the 18 western counties along the Missouri River in central and western Missouri.

== Growth ==
Until 1812, the region that became Missouri was known as Upper Louisiana. The institution of slavery only became especially prominent in the area following three major events: the transfer of Upper Louisiana from France to Spain in the 1760s; passage of the Northwest Ordinance by the United States in 1787; and the Louisiana Purchase in 1803. From the 1760s through the 1770s, a significant number of French-descended enslavers migrated from Illinois to present-day Missouri due to the British empire's inability to govern Illinois. In the 1780s and the 1790s, French enslavers continued to migrate from Illinois to Missouri due to the chaos caused by the U.S. War for Independence, and then passage of the Northwest Ordinance, which provisionally banned slavery in Illinois. In the 1790s, a growing number of enslavers from the United States began bypassing Illinois and settling directly in Upper Louisiana, where the Spanish government offered enslavers generous landgrants. After the 1803 Louisiana Purchase, the number of U.S. enslavers who migrated to Upper Louisiana increased steadily.

When Louisiana was purchased in 1803, 2,000–3,000 enslaved men and women were within the limits of what is now Missouri. Perhaps 10% were of Native American descent. Most colonizers and enslaved people lived in the area around St. Louis and Ste. Genevieve. In 1803, enslaved Native Americans and African Americans accounted for about 15% of Upper Louisiana's non-Indigenous population and approximately 20% of the population in the main settlements. In 1820, white Missourians held approximately 12,000 African Americans in slavery, approximately 20% of the population. By 1860 the Black population comprised 9.7% of the state's total including 3,572 free Blacks and 114,931 who were enslaved. By the beginning of the American Civil War, 32% of counties in Missouri had 1,000 or more enslaved individuals. Enslaved men cost up to $1,300. In the State Auditor's 1860 report, the total value of all enslaved people in Missouri was estimated at US$44,181,912 (~$1.29 billion in 2025).

From the 1770s through the 1810s, the mostly French-descended group of enslavers used enslaved men and women in commercial agriculture, in service to the fur trade, and for lead mining. While most people held in slavery were of African descent, approximately 10% were either Indigenous or of mixed Native and African American descent. European colonization in Missouri was confined primarily to St. Louis, Ste. Genevieve, and their surrounding villages. St. Louis's economy was focused on the fur trade with Native Americans up the Missouri Valley. The fur trade was also an important source for enslaved Native Americans, who comprised somewhere between 5% and 10% of the enslaved population of Spanish Upper Louisiana from the 1770s through the 1790s. Ste. Genevieve enslavers focused primarily on commercial agriculture, which was used to provision Franco-Hispanic plantation operations downriver in Lower Louisiana. The great growth of plantation operations in Lower Louisiana in the 1790s spurred the growth of commercial agriculture in Upper Louisiana. Spanish land grants – which were inflated for enslavers - attracted a growing migration of U.S. enslavers to the region around Ste. Genevieve, New Madrid, and Cape Girardeau. U.S. colonizers in the 1790s also spurred on the growth of lead-mining and lead-smelting in the region, led by Austin Moses. By 1810, the number of U.S. enslavers outnumbered the original French enslaver-colonizers.

After 1815, the great growth of slavery in Missouri would occur in the “Boon’s Lick” settlements along the Missouri River in central Missouri. By 1811, around seventy-five families claimed land in the Boon’s Lick settlements. Henry Marie Brackenridge identified them as “generally persons in good circumstances,” and noted that “most of them have slaves.” Word circulated in the Upper South about the rich fertility of the Boon’s Lick settlements, which had not yet been surveyed or brought to market by the U.S. government. In 1815, Superintendent of Indian Affairs William Clark sought to legitimate the settlements and to sell titles to the land. To do so, he declared that an 1808 Osage Treaty included the Sauk and Meskwaki lands that the Boon’s Lick colonizers were invading. Indian Agent Pierre Chouteau rewrote his notes from previous treaties to show that the Boon’s Lick settlements on Sauk and Meskwaki lands were indeed part of the 1808 Treaty. Clark and Chouteau’s rewriting of the 1808 Treaty legitimated U.S. claims to the region, and thousands of colonizers invaded the Boon’s Lick. Between 1810 and 1820, upwards of 15,000 colonizers settled in the Boon’s Lick. They forced perhaps 5,000 or so enslaved African Americans to join them. Between 1815 and 1820, the Boon’s Lick region was likely the most fastest growing region in the United States. The rapid colonization of the Boon’s Lick by enslavers all but guaranteed that white Missourians would resist Congressional efforts to impose restrictions on slavery when Missouri sought statehood in 1819.

With the Missouri Crisis, Congress sought to force a long-term plan of gradual abolition on Missouri. During debates over Missouri statehood, New York Congressman James Tallmadge proposed that Missouri end the importation of enslaved people and free the children of all enslaved people in Missouri at adulthood. Southern congressman fiercely opposed Tallmadge’s proposal, setting off the Missouri Crisis of 1819 – 1821. The Missouri Crisis temporarily slowed the growth of slavery in Missouri, as did the lingering effects of the Crisis of 1819, and rampant land speculation. By the mid-1820s, however, migration had resumed.

After 1820, most U.S. enslavers who migratred to Missouri had moved from worn-out agricultural lands in North Carolina, Tennessee, Kentucky, and Virginia. Cotton cultivation, arguably the cash-crop to which slave labor was the most important, was never as well-suited to Missouri's climate or soils as to the rest of the southern United States, and was limited to the most southern parts of the state near the border with present-day Arkansas. Slavery in other areas of Missouri was concentrated in commercial agriculture and cash-crops, including tobacco, hemp, grain, and livestock. After the 1830s, such plantations were increasingly concentrated along the Missouri River, particularly in the central and western half of the state. Many enslaved men and women were also hired out as stevedores, cabin boys, or deckhands on the ferries of the Mississippi River. By the 1830s, the importance of slavery in St. Louis declined, and many enslaved African Americans worked to free themselves from their enslavement. By 1860, perhaps 1,500 free African Americans lived in St. Louis.

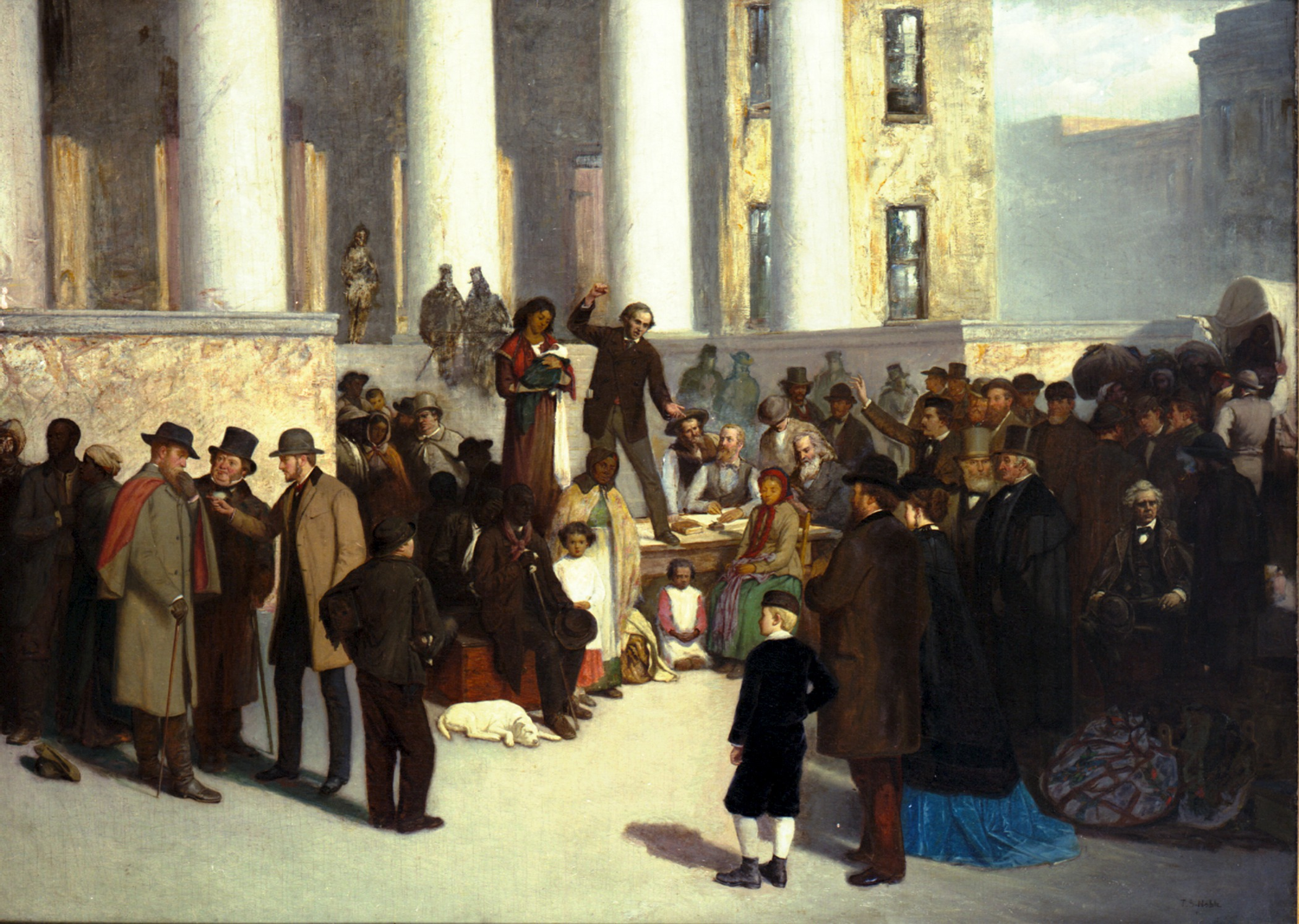
Slave auction in 1861 in Saint-Louis, by Thomas Satterwhite Noble

== Slave codes ==
Spanish officials established slaves codes in the 1770s. Under U.S. rule, Missouri's territorial slave code was enacted in 1804, a year after the Louisiana Purchase, under which slaves were banned from the use of firearms, participation in unlawful assemblies, or selling alcoholic beverages to other slaves. It also severely punished slaves for participating in riots, insurrections, or disobedience of their masters. It also provided for punishment by mutilation of a slave who sexually assaulted a white woman; a white man who sexually assaulted a female slave of another white man was typically charged with nothing more than trespassing upon her owner's property. The code was retained by the State Constitution of 1820.

At the end of 1824, the Missouri General Assembly passed a law providing a process for enslaved persons to sue for freedom and have some protections in the process. An 1825 law passed by the General Assembly declared blacks incompetent as witnesses in legal cases which involved whites, and testimonies by black witnesses were automatically invalidated. In 1847, an ordinance banning the education of blacks and mulattoes was enacted. Anyone caught teaching a black or mulatto person, whether enslaved or free, was to be fined $500 and serve six months in jail.

Elijah Lovejoy edited an abolitionist newspaper, the Observer, in St. Louis but was driven out by a mob in 1836. He fled across the Mississippi River to Alton, Illinois, where he was later murdered in an exchange of gunfire with a pro-slavery mob.

== Dred Scott case ==
In 1846, one of the nation's most public legal controversies regarding slavery began in St. Louis Circuit Court. Dred Scott, a slave from birth, sued his owner's widow on the basis of a Missouri precedent holding that slaves freed through prolonged residence in a free state or territory would remain free upon returning to Missouri. Scott had spent several years living in Illinois and the Wisconsin Territory with his owner, Dr. John Emerson, before returning to Missouri in 1840. After Emerson's death, Emerson's widow refused to buy Scott's and his family's freedom, so Scott resorted to the legal action permitted him under Missouri's 1824 law.

Scott eventually lost his case in the Missouri Supreme Court, but brought legal suit again in 1853 under federal law. The case was appealed to the United States Supreme Court and became a flashpoint in the ongoing national debate over the legality of slavery. In 1857, the Supreme Court handed down its verdict in Dred Scott v. Sandford: slaves were not citizens, and therefore Scott did not have the right to sue for his family's freedom. The landmark decision found the provisions of the Missouri Compromise of 1820 unconstitutional, and helped to fan the flames of conflict between pro-slavery and anti-slavery factions in the United States. The Scott family was eventually granted freedom by their owners, but Scott died shortly after, in 1858.

== Bleeding Kansas and John Brown ==
Missouri, before 1850, was bordered on the west and northwest with vast and sparsely populated territories obtained via the Louisiana Purchase and the Mexican Cession. When the Kansas–Nebraska Act was passed in 1854, leaving the explosive question of whether new states would be free states or slave states to be decided by "popular sovereignty", Missouri was very involved in trying to "export" slavery to Kansas. Missourians tried to see that Kansas would be a slave state.

It will be remembered that the first territorial legislature [of Kansas] was elected fraudulently by voters who actually lived in Missouri. This body of law-makers assembled first at Pawnee in July, 1855, but immediately moved to Shawnee Mission, near the Missouri border, where they completed their labors in a proslavery atmosphere and in the most shameless proslavery fashion, — establishing the entire code of Missouri as the laws of Kansas and adding whatever beside they could think of that they believed would aid in the establishment of slavery in the territory.

On December 20, 1858, John Brown entered Vernon County in southwest Missouri, liberated 11 slaves, took captive two white men, and looted horses and wagons. (See Battle of the Spurs.) The Governor of Missouri announced a reward of $3,000 (equivalent to $107,500 in 2025) for his capture. On January 20, 1859, Brown embarked on a lengthy journey to take the liberated slaves to Detroit and then on a ferry to Canada.

== The end of slavery in Missouri ==
As one of the border states during the American Civil War, Missouri was exempt from President Abraham Lincoln's 1863 Emancipation Proclamation decreeing the freedom of slaves in all territory then held by Confederate forces. On January 11, 1865, a state convention approved an ordinance abolishing slavery in Missouri by a vote of 60–4, and later the same day, Governor Thomas C. Fletcher followed up with his own "Proclamation of Freedom". This action effectively marked the end of legal slavery in the state of Missouri.

== See also ==
- Marguerite Scypion, a slave of African and Native American descent who sued for her freedom
- Missouri Constitutional Convention of 1861–1863
- History of slavery in the United States by state
- List of Missouri slave traders
