= John D. James, Thomas G. James, and David D. James =

19th-century American slave traders

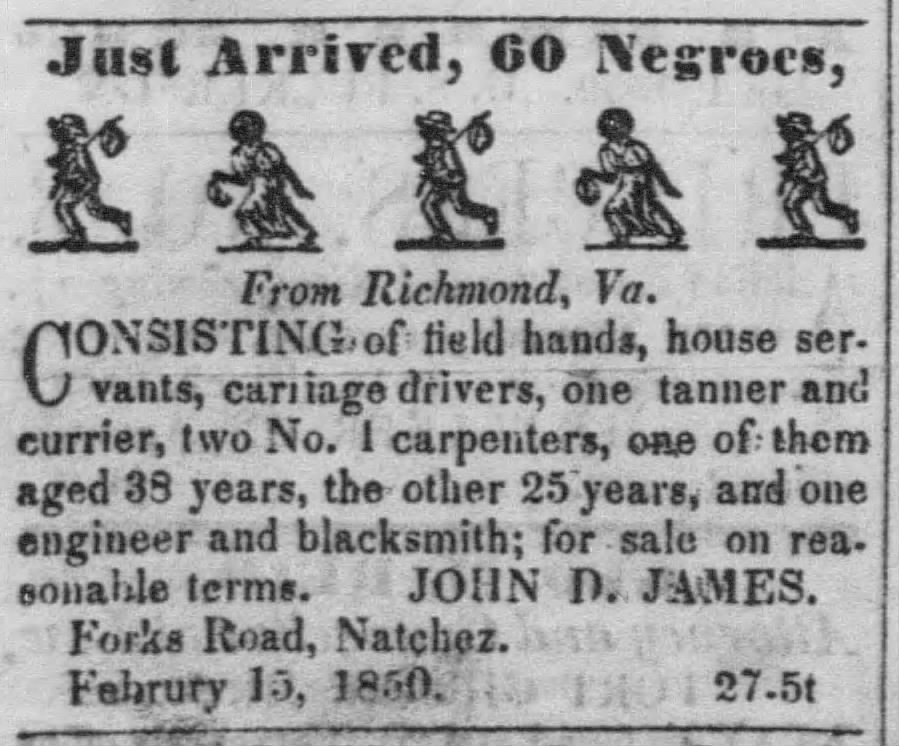
"Just Arrived, 60 Negroes" The Port Gibson Herald, and Correspondent, Port Gibson, Mississippi, March 8, 1850

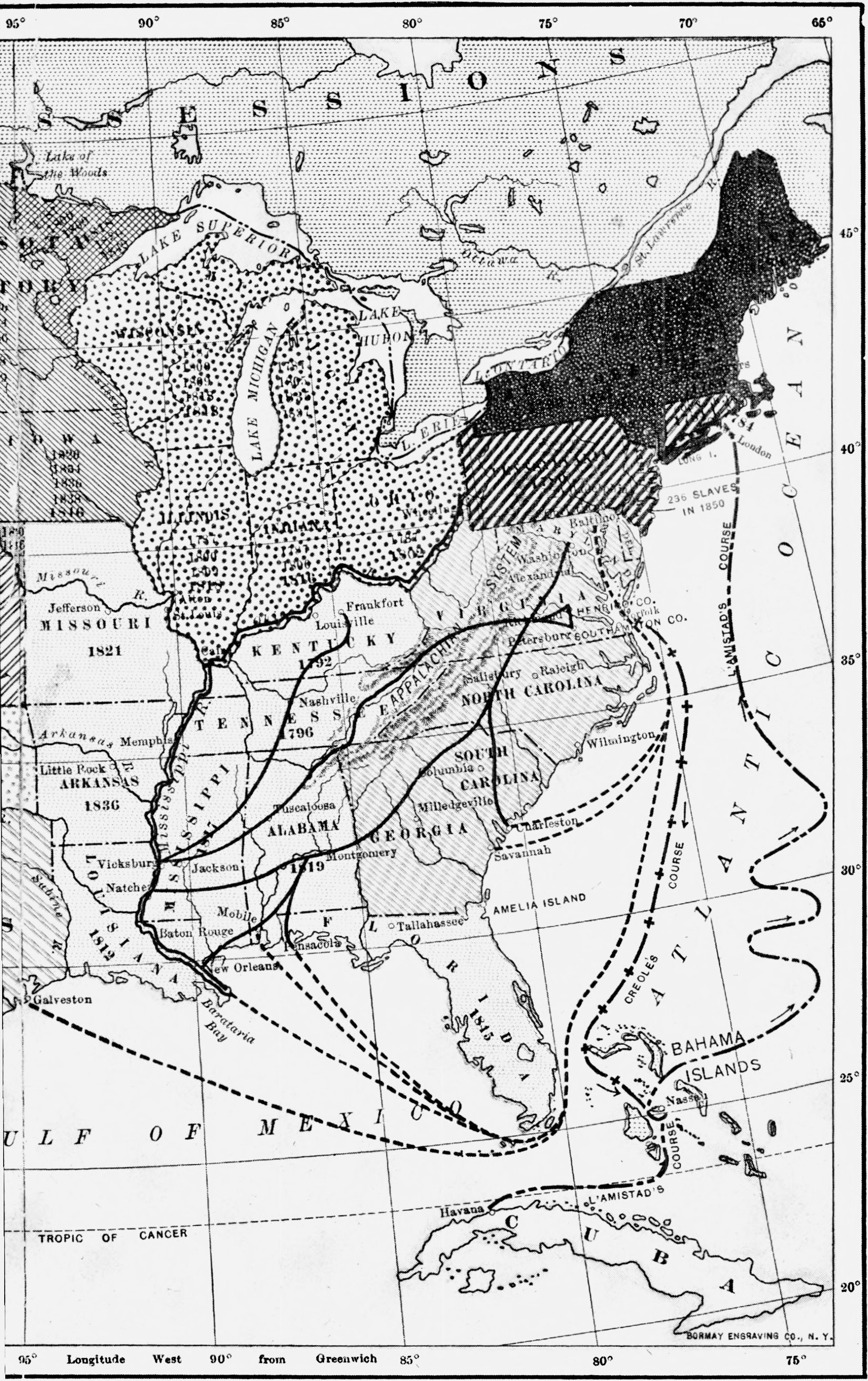
Map of slavery and slave trade in the United States 1830–1850 by Albert Bushnell Hart (1906) showing overland routes from Nashville and Richmond to Natchez and environs

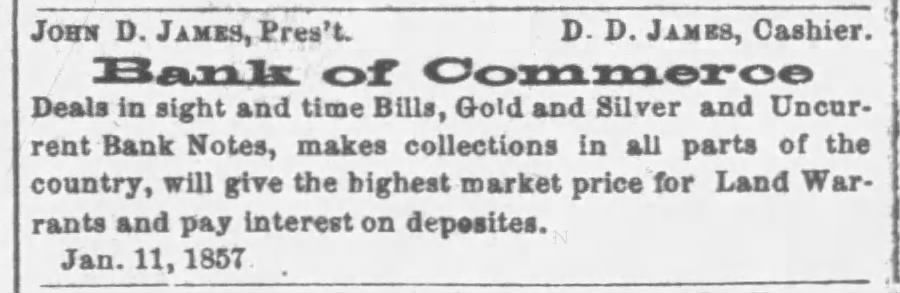
"Bank of Commerce" John D. James, president, David D. James, cashier, Republican Banner, Nashville, Tennessee, February 26, 1857

John D. James, Thomas G. James, and David D. James were brothers and 19th-century American businessmen who worked as interstate slave traders for the 30 years prior to the American Civil War. They also opened a bank in 1855.

== Careers and court cases ==
Born in the 1810s in the Nashville, Tennessee area, they grew wealthy as interstate slave traders and bankers before the American Civil War. They had a stand at the Forks of the Road slave market in Natchez, Mississippi where they sold people that had been transported from the Upper South.

In 1835, a formerly enslaved woman named Julia sued her daughter Harriet's owner Samuel T. McKenney, and slave traders William Walker and Thomas D. James on the basis that she had been trafficked illegally through a free state (Illinois) so that she could be resold in Missouri and therefore was entitled to her freedom. In 1848, John D. James sold nine enslaved people to a Joseph J. B. Kirk in Point Coupee Parish, Louisiana. One of those people, Simon, repeatedly tried to escape and was ultimately drowned while on the run. Kirk sued James under Louisiana's slave redhibition laws, which were essentially mandatory warranties. According to historian Ariela J. Gross, James argued in court that Louisiana was endangering slavery itself by the application of these laws.

In 1849 the Jameses were sued in Mississippi. According to an abstract of the case record for James v. Herring, 12 S. and M. 336, January 1849., David D. James escorted a drove south from Virginia in 1845 that included an enslaved man named Egerton. According to an abstract of the case James v. Herring, they "left Richmond about the 21st of August...and reached Natchez about the 3d or 4th of October following." When Egerton died of an abdominal/gastrointestinal illness shortly after being settled on the plantation of Mary Herring, she sued for the purchase price and damages. In 1855 they were sued in Tennessee. According to case record James v. Drake, 35 Tenn. 340 (Tenn. 1855), the intent of the suit was "to recover the value of a slave named Bill" who had died of smallpox after one of the brothers had sent an enslaved woman named Kitty to Thomas D. James' house, shortly after which she exhibited symptoms of highly contagious smallpox, which ultimately infected and killed Bill. According to historian Gross, allowing disputes about a solitary slave to get to court was a hallmark of "local traders like John D. James and his family members" whereas very large interstate traders usually sought to resolve such disputes with negotiation outside a courtroom.

In 1855, John D. James, David D. James, and A. Wheless opened a bank in Nashville. The bank had $500,000 in capital.

Despite the disdain with which slave traders were purportedly regarded in the South, letters between John D. James and a plantation owner named William Terry demonstrate that the merchant and planter classes socialized. According to Gross, "Although he wrote to Terry about the slaves he had for sale, he also wrote, 'Your Daughter Eliza at our house all yesterday...I was glad to see her look so well; I was at Mr Scotts about a week ago they were all well, Mary requests me to present her love & respects to you.'"

At the time of the 1850 census, John D. James was listed on the slave schedules as the legal owner of 27 people in Davidson County, Tennessee. Thomas G. James was the legal owner of five people.

Thomas G. James caught the attention of Harriet Beecher Stowe and is mentioned in her 1853 non-fiction polemic A Key to Uncle Tom's Cabin.

...we take up the Natchez (Mississippi) Courier of Nov. 20th, 1852, and there read:

NEGROES. The undersigned would respectfully state to the public that he has leased the stand in the Forks of the Road, near Natchez, for a term of years, and that he intends to keep a large lot of NEGROES on hand during the year. He will sell as low or lower than any other trader at this place or in New Orleans. He has just arrived from Virginia with a very likely lot of Field Men and Women; also, House Servants, three Cooks, and a Carpenter. Call and see A fine Buggy Horse, a Saddle Horse, and a Carryall, on hand, and for sale. THOS. G. JAMES. Natchez, Sept. 28, 1852.

Where in the world did this lucky Mr. THOS. G. JAMES get this likely Virginia "assortment"? Probably in some county which Mr. Thornton Randolph never visited. Had no families been separated to form the assortment? We hear of a lot of field men and women. Where are their children? We hear of a lot of house-servants—of "three cooks," and "one carpenter," as well as a "fine buggy horse." Had these unfortunate cooks and carpenters no relations? Did no sad natural tears stream down their dark cheeks when they were being "assorted" for the Natchez market? Does no mournful heart among them yearn to the song of 'O, carry me back to old Virginny'?

Later in the book Stowe used a second Thomas James advertisement as part of her evidence for her point that black families in Virginia were being scoured by slave traders to serve the markets of the lower Mississippi. In 1857 Thomas James was partners in the Nashville slave-trading business James & Harrison, which regularly advertised their slave pen at 18 Cedar Street with room for "up to 100 slaves" and weekly slave auctions on Saturdays at 10 a.m. In 1859, Thomas G. James advertised in a Nashville newspaper, offering "CASH FOR NEGROES" and promised therein that the "undersigned will pay the cash for fifty likely young Negroes; he will also board negroes and sell them on commission at No. 18 Cedar street, Nashville, Tenn., will be responsible for the escape of all negroes left in charge. Call and see."

In 1865 a Tennessee court ruled in the case of John D. James vs. Ocoee Bank, that "an acceptor of a Bill of Exchange, upon its non-payment at maturity, is not entitled to notice; his liability being absolute and unconditional." In 1867 David and Thomas James sued each other, and a tract of land was to be auctioned as a part of the settlement.

All three lost their wealth in the war, and all three lived into their 80s. As of 1891, Thomas G. James lived in penury in Nashville, David D. James lived in Texas, and John D. James lived in California.

== See also ==
- Nashville, Tennessee slave markets
- List of Tennessee slave traders

== Sources ==
- Carey, Bill (2018). Runaways, Coffles and Fancy Girls: A History of Slavery in Tennessee. Nashville, Tennessee: Clearbrook Press. ISBN 978-0-9725680-4-3. LCCN 2018903570. OCLC 1045068878.
- Catterall, Helen Tunnicliff (1932). Judicial Cases Concerning American Slavery and the Negro. Publication No. 374. Vol. III: Cases from the Courts of Georgia, Florida, Alabama, Mississippi, and Louisiana. Washington, D.C.: Carnegie Institution of Washington.
- Gross, Ariela J. (2001). Double Character: Slavery and Mastery in the Antebellum Southern Courtroom. Princeton University Press. doi:10.1515/9781400823840. ISBN 978-1-4008-2384-0.
- Stowe, Harriet Beecher (1853). A key to Uncle Tom's cabin: presenting the original facts and documents upon which the story is founded. Boston: J. P. Jewett & Co. LCCN 02004230. OCLC 317690900. OL 21879838M.
- Wong, Edlie L. (2009). "The Gender of Freedom before Dred Scott". Neither Fugitive nor Free: Atlantic Slavery, Freedom Suits, and the Legal Culture of Travel. Vol. 8. NYU Press. pp. 127–182. ISBN 978-0-8147-9455-5. JSTOR j.ctt9qgbb3.7.
