= Louis Boisdore =

18th-century New Orleans city clerk

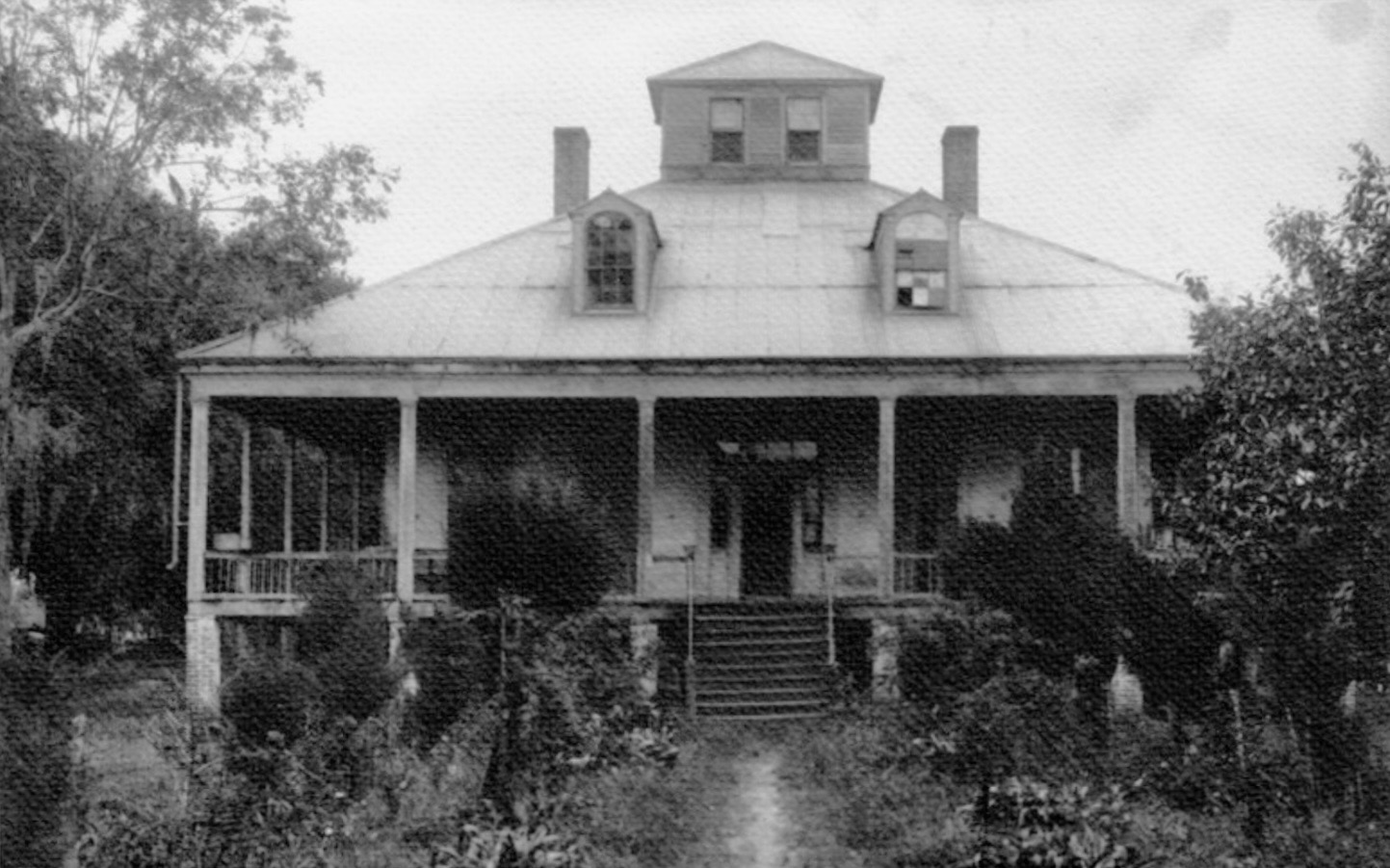
Boisdore's Mississippi house, later called Sea Glen and owned by J. F. H. Claiborne, was said to have a relic "slave dungeon" (photographed by WPA c. 1936)

Louis Boisdore, often Don Luis Boidore in Spanish colonial records, was the city steward of New Orleans, Louisiana (New Spain), in North America, from 1780 to 1781. A same-name pair, father and son, were involved in cattle ranching, real estate, and slave trading in the lower Mississippi River valley.

== Dual biography ==
According to a history of Hancock County, Mississippi, Louis Boisdore is an "enigmatic" character, part of a family that "received their deed in Hancock County in 1781. There is record of a 1781 land grant on Bayou Nezpique in Opelousas County in Louisiana to one Antoine Boisdore.

They were related through marriage to the Collon family, and the Favres. Like many French settlers they moved from Mobile to New Orleans to escape the British occupation of West Florida that began in 1763. They took possession of the region upon the defeat of Great Britain and the return of Spanish rule. The name Boisdore still appears on topographic maps, bayous, and in some descriptions of the Ancient Earthwork, also known as the Boisdore Fortification."

He owned the property at 600-610 Bourbon Street in New Orleans from 1768 to 1769. In 1776, he sued Juan Fauve for 609 pesos and an enslaved woman named Luison. However, because Jean Favre (as he was also known) " Because the trader lived in British West Florida and owned no property in Spanish Louisiana, collecting this debt would prove difficult... Jean Favre's debt to Louis Boisdore would not be collected until after his death in 1782, when widow Marguerite agreed to pay."

According to research by Ronald R. Morazan, in May 1776 he borrowed "911 pesos from Antonio Thomassin, so that he could pay off his debt to the agent of the French government, Juan Rene Gabriel Fazende. As security for the loan made by Thomassin, Boisdore placed all of his goods as well as a house which he owned on Royal Street," and then "paid the sum of 990 pesos to Juan Rene Gabriel Fazende, Treasurer of Marine and Business Agent for His Christian Majesty (Louis XV of France), for money owed the French government and the release of the sequestered property" of Jean Noël Destréhan. The same year he paid Maria Francisca Girard 400 pesos for an enslaved man named Juan. He sold "several" slaves to George Guimberty and Enriquez Despres the same year. In 1782, he contracted with a pair of pardos libres (light-skinned free men of color), Marion Gayarre and Batista, who typically worked as coopers, to work for him "at a rate of four hundred pesos per year (about thirty pesos monthly)."

His house on Royal Street was located at what is now 701–705, and he also had a property on Dauphine Street.

There were 34 enslaved people attached to the estate of Louis Boisdore I (père) in 1788. He and/or his same-name son worked as a "middling but aspiring" merchant in the city's slave trade in the 1780s and 1790s. Louis Boisdore sold 52 people in New Orleans in the period from 1783 to 1796, and Antoine Boisdore, possibly a relative, sold 47 people.

In 1792 Luis Boisdore was a second lieutenant in the Batallon de Milicias disciplinadas de la Nueva Orleans. In 1796 Luis Boisdore was an ensign in the Distinguished Carabineer Militia of New Orleans.

Around 1800, enslaved people owned or employed by Louis Boisdore II built a house near Bay St. Louis, in present-day Hancock County, Mississippi. A hand-drawn map dating to about 1800, entitled vacharie de Monsieur Boisdore, showing the Pearl River area at that time, is held in the collections of the Library of Congress. According to a description recorded in 1962, the ancient house had an oubliette, "Its raised main floor is supported by high brick piers, once joined together with iron bars to form a large cage under the house, where the new slaves brought from Africa were confined until they were docile enough to live in the slave quarters behind the house." In 1849, the Supreme Court of the United States ruled on United States v. Boisdore's Heirs, 49 U.S. 113 (1850), in regard to a Spanish land grant in the vicinity of Pearl River where Boisdore had had a cattle ranch.

The house near Bay St. Louis later became known as the "Saucier plantation of Mulatto Bayou," (Note: Mulatto Bayou (GNIS 674456) is a candidate for renaming by the U.S. Board of Geographic Names.) and eventually came into the hands of Mississippi politician and historian J. F. H. Claiborne. The historic house was demolished to make way for the Port Bienville Industrial Park.

== See also ==
- New Orleans slave market

== Sources ==
- Hanger, Kimberly S. (1997). Bounded Lives, Bounded Places: Free Black Society in Colonial New Orleans, 1769–1803. Durham: Duke University Press.
- Unser, Daniel H. (2022). "Chapter 2 'A Prospect of the Grand Sublime': An Atlantic World Borderland Seen and Unseen by William Bartram". In Braund, Kathryn H. (ed.). The Attention of a Traveller: Essays on William Bartram's "Travels" and Legacy. University of Alabama Press. pp. 19–36. doi:10.2307/jj.30347725.7. ISBN 978-0-8173-9407-3.
