= Louisa Picquet =

American author and enslaved person

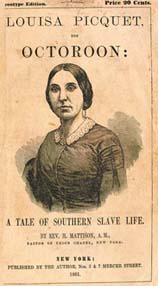
- Frontispiece of Picquet's narrative, 1861
- Born: c. 1829; Columbia, South Carolina
- Died: August 11, 1896; New Richmond, Ohio
- Notable work: Louisa Picquet, the Octoroon, or, Inside Views of Southern Domestic Life

Louisa Picquet (c. 1829, Columbia, South Carolina – August 11, 1896, New Richmond, Ohio) was an African American born into slavery. Her slave narrative, Louisa Picquet, the Octoroon, or, Inside Views of Southern Domestic Life, was published in 1861. The narrative, written by abolitionist pastor Hiram Mattison, details Picquet's experiences with subjects like sexual violence, Christianity, and colorism. By producing the narrative, Mattison and Picquet hoped to raise enough money to buy Picquet's mother out of slavery.

== Personal life ==
Louisa Picquet was born on a plantation in Lexington County, South Carolina. Picquet's master, John Randolph, sold Picquet and her mother to David R. Cook, who fled to Mobile, Alabama with his slaves after getting into trouble with creditors.

In Mobile, Louisa performed domestic duties for Thomas M. English, who owned the house where Cook was boarding.

When Cook defaulted on his debts, Picquet was sold at auction to John Williams in New Orleans, separating her from her mother and infant brother. After Williams' death in the 1840s, Picquet obtained her freedom. She remained in the Williams household until Williams' brother informed her that he was selling the house. She then moved in with her friend, a Black woman named Helen Hopkins. She began to sell some of Williams' furniture, which allowed her to raise enough money to move with her children to Cincinnati, Ohio.

In Cincinnati, Picquet assumed the name of Louisa Williams. Shortly after her arrival, one of her two remaining children died, leaving her with only her daughter Elizabeth. After meeting Henry Picquet of Augusta, Georgia, the couple married in 1850 and had two children, Sarah (1852) and Thomas (1856).

While in Cincinnati, Picquet concentrated on buying her mother from slavery. After inquiring about her mother for eleven years, she discovered that a friend knew her mother's master, Mr. Horton, in Texas. Picquet began exchanging letters with her mother and Mr. Horton in 1859. Picquet's mother immediately informed her that Mr. Horton was willing to sell her for $1000 and Picquet's brother for $1500, or exchange them for equivalent property value.

In October 1860, Mr. Horton agreed to sell Picquet's mother for $900 (~$32,250 in 2025) and Picquet was able to buy her mother out of slavery. She was not reunited with her brother.

Shortly after Picquet's mother arrived in Cincinnati, the Civil War began. Due to an injury Picquet's husband sustained while serving in the Union Army, Louisa had to provide for their family by taking in laundry. The family moved around 1867 to New Richmond, Ohio, where Henry attempted to collect a Veteran's Invalid Pension for nearly fifteen years. His application was eventually approved and he began receiving six dollars a month, but he died of heart disease shortly thereafter.

After her husband's death, Louisa sought and obtained a Widow's Army Pension and received twelve dollars a month until her death in August 1896.

== Family ==
Picquet's mother, Elizabeth Ramsay, was raped by her master, John Randolph, and gave birth at the age of fifteen. Elizabeth had three more children, but only Picquet and her youngest brother, John, survived into adulthood. John was fathered by Elizabeth's master in Alabama, Mr. Cook.

While living in New Orleans, Picquet had four children, all of whom were fathered by her master, John Williams. Two of her children died before she obtained her freedom. Another one of her children died soon after arriving to Cincinnati. Her only surviving daughter, Elizabeth, was eighteen when they reached Ohio.

Picquet met her husband, Henry, three years after moving to Cincinnati. Henry had one daughter, Harriet, prior to meeting her. The couple had two more children together: Sarah (1852) and Thomas (1856).

== Slave narrative ==
While traveling through Buffalo, New York to collect money to secure her mother's freedom, Picquet was advised to speak with Hiram Mattison, an abolitionist pastor and author. Picquet arrived in New York City in May 1860 and met Mattison, who became her amanuensis. By producing this slave narrative, Mattison hoped to help Picquet raise more money to buy her mother from Mr. Horton (Picquet purchased her mother's freedom while Mattison was writing the narrative).

Louisa Picquet, the Octoroon, or, Inside Views of Southern Domestic Life was published in 1861. The document was written and narrated by Mattison, with many of its chapters structured in the format of an interview. Mattison asks Picquet specific questions about how her children, how her masters treated her and other enslaved persons, and where she lived after obtaining her freedom. Mattison also includes letters sent to Picquet by her mother as well as excerpts from various newspapers from the time period.

== Themes in slave narrative ==
=== Sexual violence ===
Picquet explains how enslaved women with domestic occupations, such as housekeepers or seamstresses, were particularly vulnerable . In total, Picquet's narrative describes the abuse that six enslaved women endured--five of whom were light-skinned, and all of whom were domestic workers While the experiences of these women vary, Picquet suggests that each of them was involved in a coercive and violent relationship with their respective master.

When she was a young teenager, Picquet's second master attempted to rape her, but he was intercepted by the white boarding house owner. However, he continued to sexually harass Picquet and often whipped her when she did not submit to his sexual advances.

Picquet's third master kept her as his concubine and she gave birth to four of his kids. She informed Mattison that "[e]very body knew I was housekeeper, but he never let on that he was the father of my children." Picquet does not describe her relationship with the children.

=== Religion ===
As a clergyman and a prominent antislavery agitator, Mattison objected to the church's support of slavery. Throughout the narrative, he stresses the contradictory nature of Christian slaveholders and calls upon the American Christian to "use all his influence, socially, ecclesiastically, and politically, to undermine and destroy [slavery.]"

In her responses to Mattison, Picquet explains how Mr. Williams refused to allow her to attend church while she was enslaved. Upon his death, she attended a church service for the first time in six years. Picquet became a member of the Zion Baptist Church in Cincinnati and was baptized in 1852.

=== Colorism ===
Because Picquet had only 1/8th African ancestry, she had a very light complexion and others regularly questioned her Blackness. Upon meeting Picquet, Mattison struggled to believe she was a former slave because she appeared to be white, and even employed his cousin to confirm Picquet's identity by wiring her bank in Cincinnati.

In her narrative, Picquet refers to several other white passing enslaved persons she encountered. Mattison repeatedly asks Picquet if the other enslaved persons are as white as Picquet herself, drawing attention to the irony of racialized slavery.
