= A Key to Uncle Tom's Cabin =

Book by Harriet Beecher Stowe

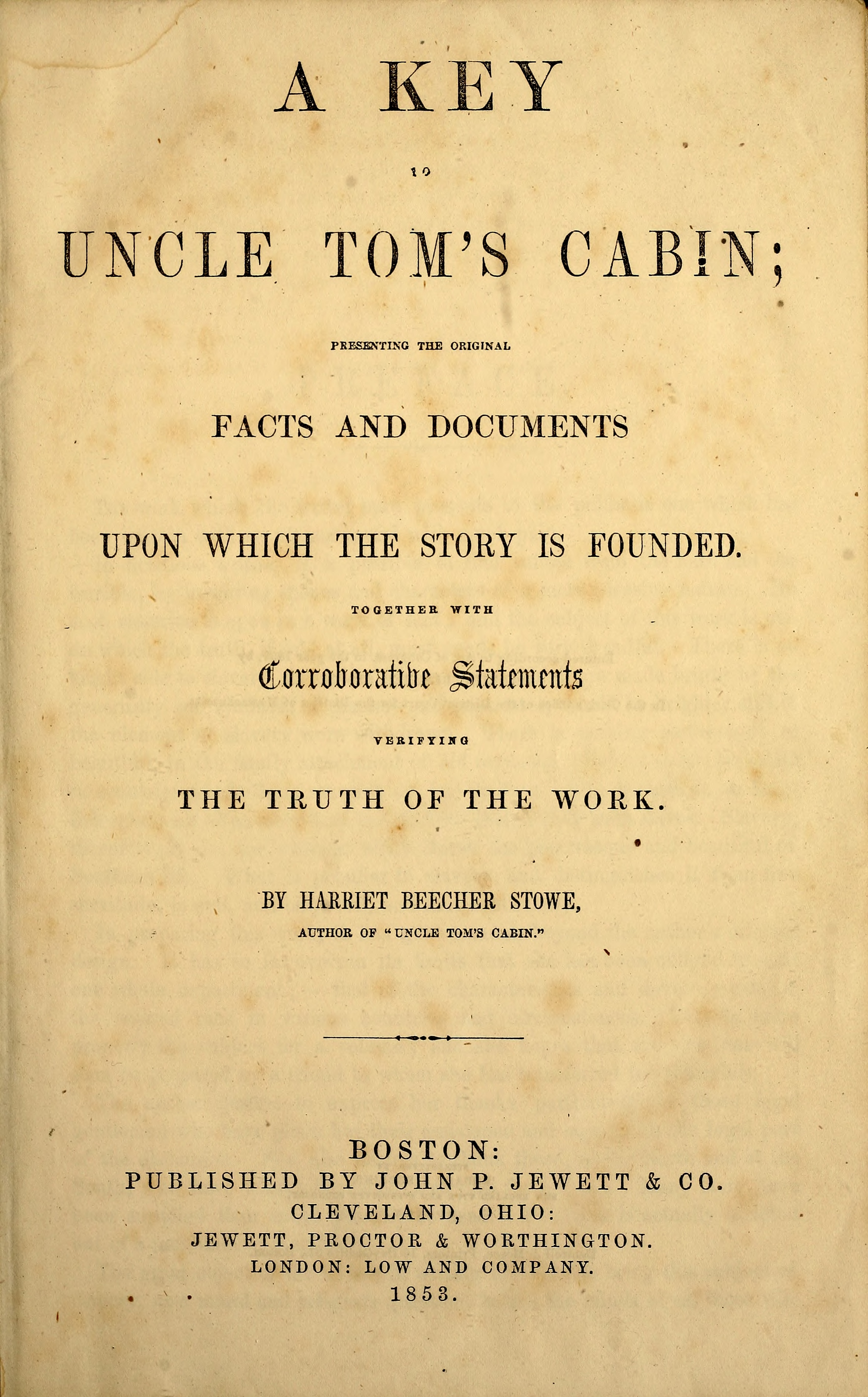
- A key to Uncle Tom's cabin presenting the original facts and documents upon which the story is founded together with corroborative statements verifying the truth of the work
- Author: Harriet Beecher Stowe
- Language: English
- Subject: Slavery
- Genre: Polemical non-fiction
- Published: 1853
- Publisher: Jewett, Proctor & Worthington
- Publication place: United States
- Pages: 268
- OCLC: 5428664
- Dewey Decimal: 813.37 STO
- LC Class: E449 .S8959
- Preceded by: Uncle Tom's Cabin
- Text: A Key to Uncle Tom's Cabin at Wikisource

A Key to Uncle Tom's Cabin is a book by American author Harriet Beecher Stowe. It was published to document the veracity of the depiction of slavery in Stowe's anti-slavery novel Uncle Tom's Cabin (1852). First published in 1853 by Jewett, Proctor & Worthington, the book also provides insights into Stowe's own views on slavery.

== Origins ==
After the publication of Uncle Tom's Cabin, Southerners accused Stowe of misrepresenting slavery. In order to show that she had neither lied about slavery nor exaggerated the plight of enslaved people, she compiled A Key to Uncle Tom's Cabin. The book was subtitled "Presenting the Original Facts and Documents upon Which the Story Is Founded, Together with Corroborative Statements Verifying the Truth of the Work".

== Reception ==
The reaction of Stowe's contemporaries to A Key to Uncle Tom's Cabin was very similar to the reaction to Uncle Tom's Cabin, with both very positive and very negative reviews. The responses of abolitionists and Northerners in general were among the positive, lauding the documentation of the evils of slavery and the confirmation of the truth of Uncle Tom's Cabin.

The great interest in Uncle Tom's Cabin in England also transferred to the Key. One English review of the 1853 publication called it a "marvelous book, more so if possible than Uncle Tom's Cabin itself". This same review also commends Stowe's self-control and character. This impression of Stowe and the reception of the book is very different from the reaction to the Key in the South.

The pro-slavery response to the Key paralleled the response to Uncle Tom's Cabin. Despite Stowe's use of documented examples, most Southern reviews still claimed that Stowe was misrepresenting slavery and exaggerating the cruelty of the institution. A review in the Southern Literary Messenger called the Key a "distortion of the facts and mutilation of the records, for the sake of giving substance to the scandalous fancy, and reduplicating the falsehood of the representation". Although these reviews claimed that Stowe was misrepresenting slavery, they did not accuse Stowe of using false documentation. Rather they claimed that the examples that Stowe provided are the most extreme instances, which she gathered to give the worst possible impression of the institution of slavery, and of the South. One critic, William Simms, accused her of using faulty argumentation by gathering facts to prove her assumption, instead of forming assumptions based on facts.

Another pro-slavery response to both Uncle Tom's Cabin and A Key to Uncle Tom's Cabin was attacks on Stowe's character. Many reviews made insinuations about what sort of woman Stowe must be to write about such events as were found in the Key. A review by George Holmes questioned whether "scenes of license and impurity, and ideas of loathsome depravity and habitual prostitution [are] to be made the cherished topics of the female pen"; he appealed to women, especially Southern women, not to read Stowe's works.

Despite the attacks from pro-slavery reviewers, A Key to Uncle Tom's Cabin sold well: 90,000 copies in the first month, a clear best-seller.

== Additional images ==
A Key to Uncle Tom's Cabin
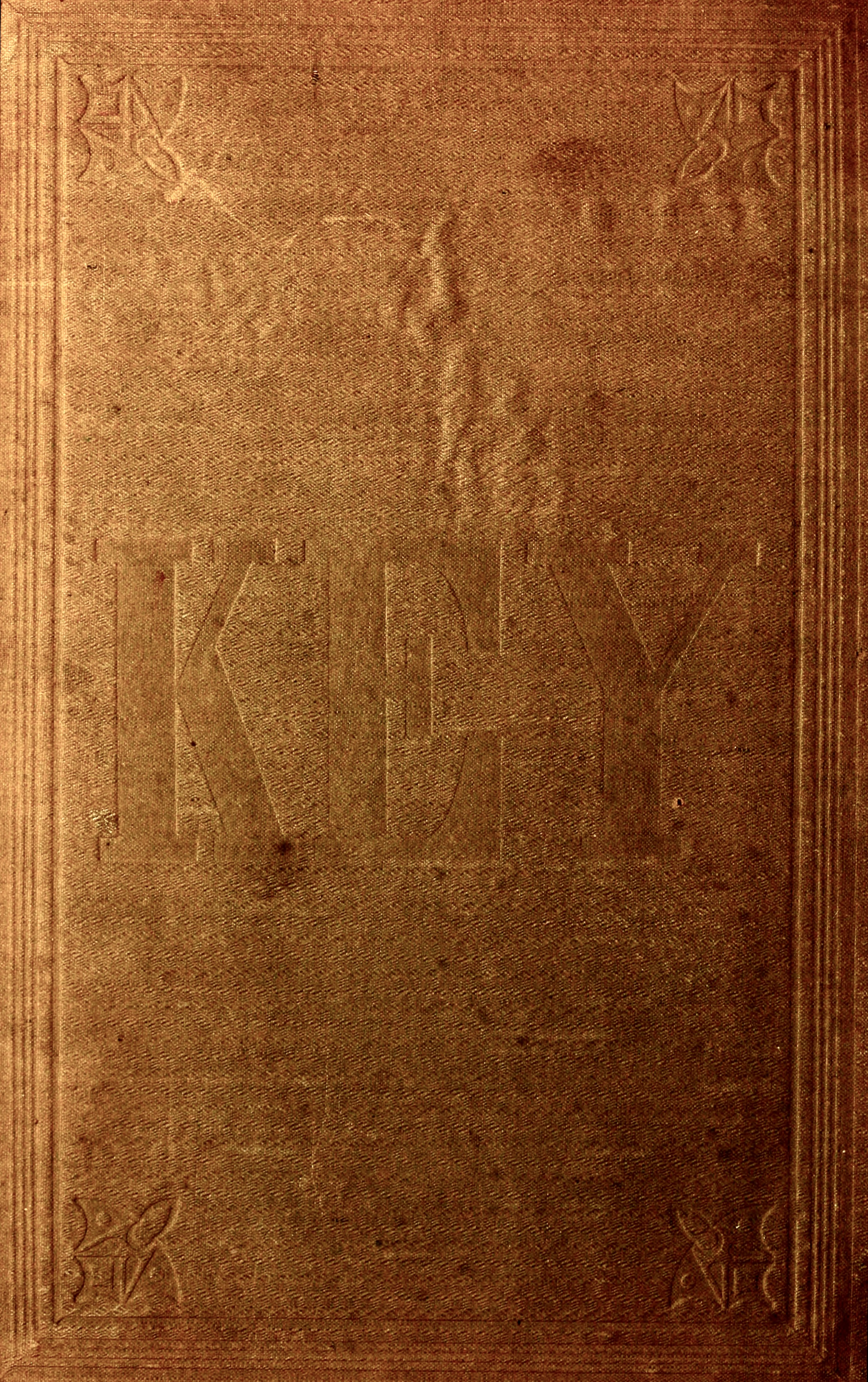
Cover of first edition

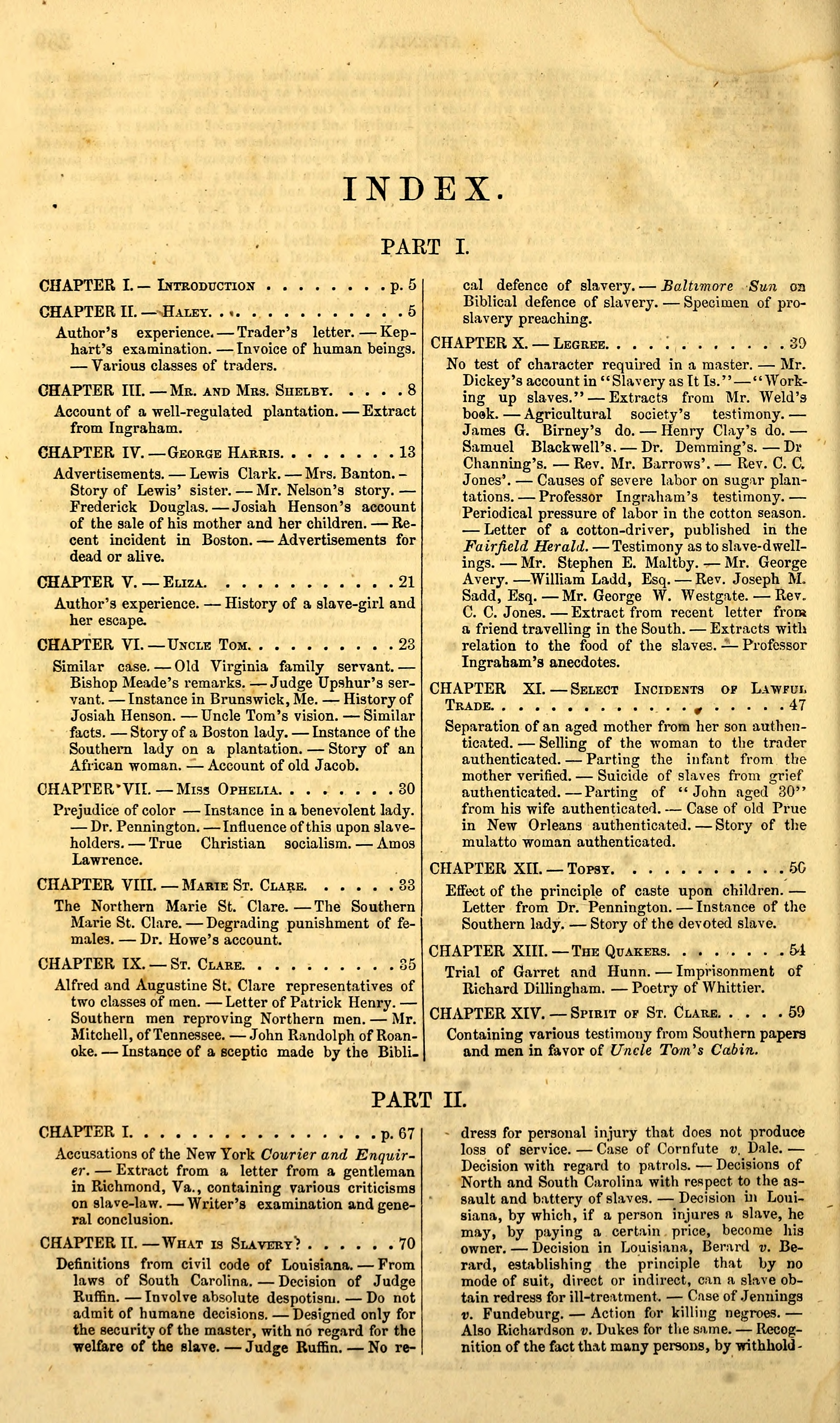
Table of contents (part 1 of 3), called an index, appears at the end of the original book

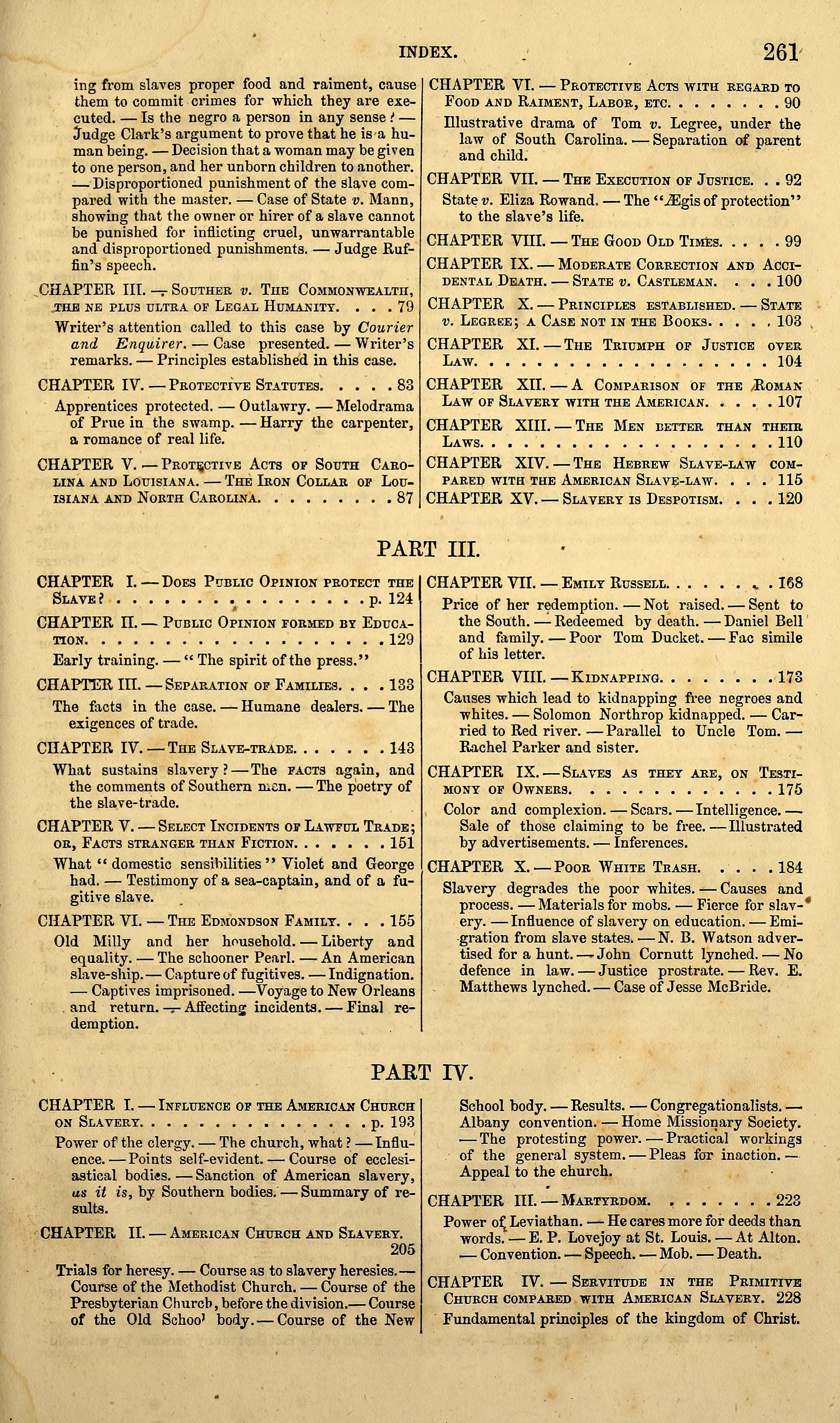
Table of contents (part 2 of 3)

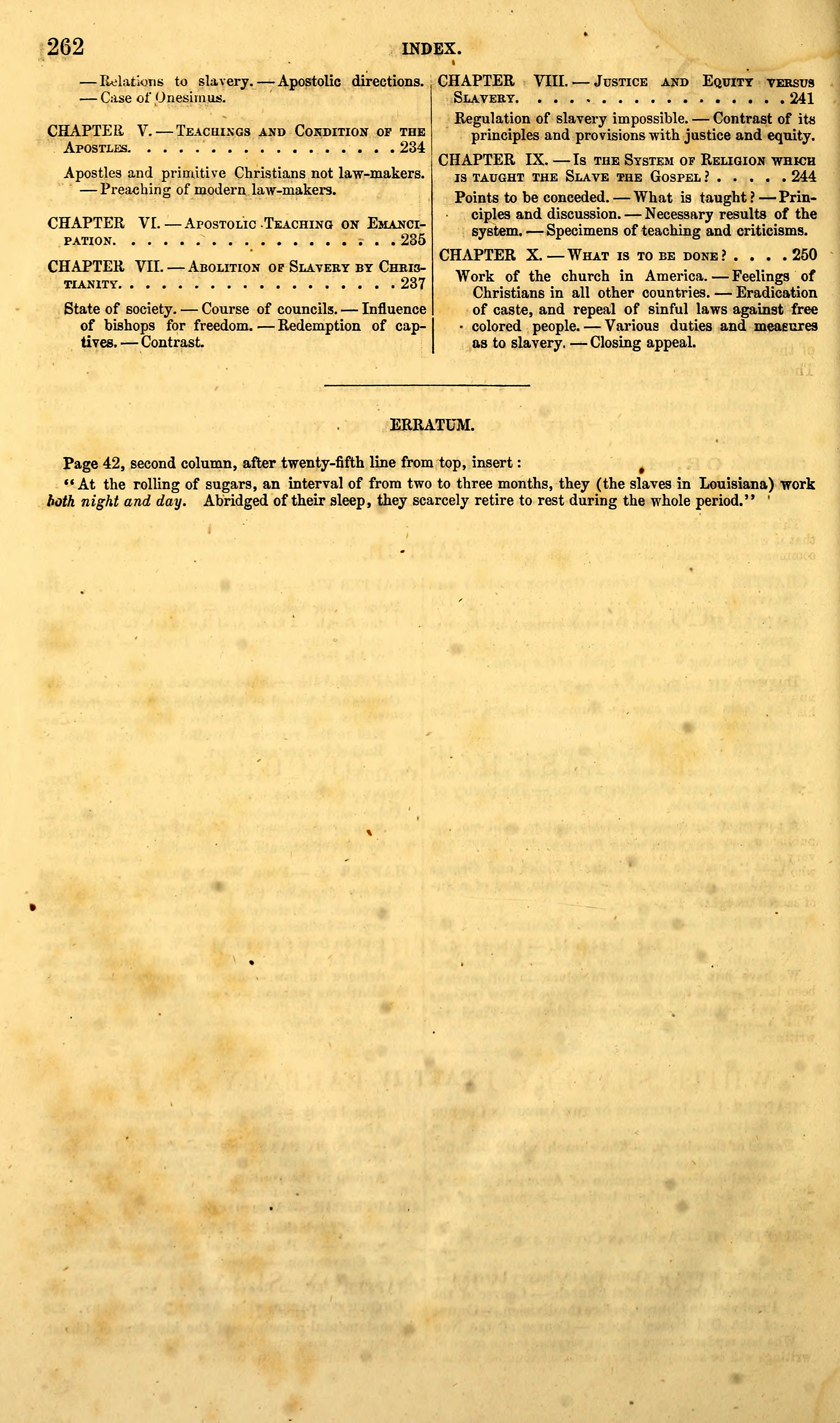
Table of contents (part 3 of 3)
