= Poindexter (surname) =

Poindexter is a Jèrriais surname most commonly found in the United States, but originally from the island of Jersey between Britain and France, where it survives in its original form of Poingdestre.

Notable people and characters with the name include:

== People ==
- Alan G. Poindexter (1961–2012), American astronaut, son of John Poindexter
- Anthony Poindexter (born 1976), American football coach
- Buster Poindexter, pseudonym of American rock musician David Johansen (1950-2025)
- Camilla Poindexter (born 1986), American reality television personality and model
- Charles Poindexter (1942–2026), American politician from Virginia
- Doug Poindexter (1927–2004), American country musician
- George Poindexter (1779–1853), American politician
- Hildrus Poindexter (1901–1987), epidemiologist and scientist
- James Poindexter (born 1949), American sport shooter
- James Preston Poindexter (1819–1907), American civil rights activist
- Jennings Poindexter (1910–1983), American baseball player
- Admiral John Poindexter (born 1936), National Security Advisor for the Reagan administration, involved in the Iran–Contra affair
- John J. Poindexter (~1816–1870), American slave trader and steamship master
- John Q. Poindexter (1854–1932), American state senator from Mississippi
- Joseph B. Poindexter (1869–1951), territorial governor of Hawaii
- Larry Poindexter (1959–2026), American actor
- Malcolm Poindexter (1925-2010), American journalist
- Miles Poindexter (1868–1946), American politician
- Pony Poindexter (1926–1988), American jazz musician
- Robert Poindexter (baseball) (1897–1930), American baseball player
- Robert Poindexter (politician), American politician
- Steve Poindexter (born 1965), American house producer and DJ
- Thomas B. Poindexter (~1804–1861), American slave trader and cotton planter

== Fictional characters ==
- Sir Marmaduke Poindexter, a character in Gilbert and Sullivan's comic opera The Sorcerer.
- Poindexter, a character in the animated TV series Felix the Cat (1959–1962), whose name has become a slang term meaning "a bookish or socially unskilled person"
- Arnold Poindexter, a character in the film Revenge of the Nerds and its sequel Revenge of the Nerds II: Nerds in Paradise
- Benjamin Poindexter is an alias sometimes used by Bullseye (Marvel Comics)
- Mr. Poindexter, in the Nick Carter spy novels, runs the Special Effects and Editing department (in charge of weapons, gadgets, disguises, and papers) in the US spy agency AXE, where he is the equivalent to Q in the James Bond franchise
- Sidney Poindexter, a nerdy ghost who loathes bullies, appears in the cartoon Danny Phantom
- William Poindexter, a member of Samwell's hockey team in Check, Please! (webcomic)
- Poindexter "Fool" Williams, a character in the film The People Under the Stairs.
