= Robert Poindexter =

Robert Poindexter may refer to:

- Robert Poindexter (baseball)
- Robert Poindexter (politician)
