= Pondexter =

Pondexter is the surname of several notable people:

- Cappie Pondexter (born 1983), American basketball player
- Cliff Pondexter (born 1954), American basketball player
- Quincy Pondexter (born 1988), American basketball player
- Roscoe Pondexter (born 1952), American basketball player

== See also ==
- Poindexter (disambiguation)
