= Simeon G. Eddins =

American slave trader (~1823–1861)

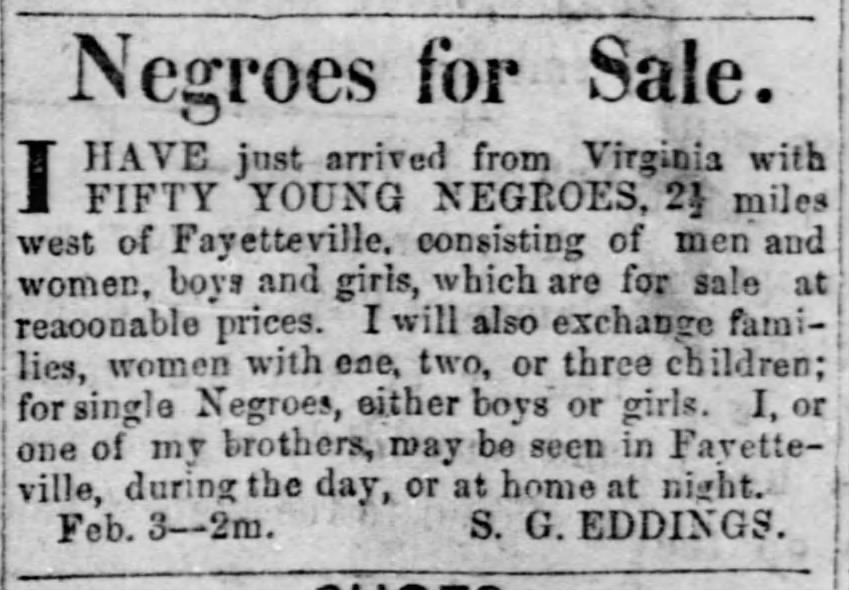
- "Negroes for Sale" Fayetteville Observer, March 31, 1859
- Born: c. 1823; Alabama, U.S.
- Died: May 19, 1861; Probably Greenville, Mississippi, U.S.
- Other name: S. G. Eddings

Simeon G. "Sim" Eddins (c. 1823 – May 19, 1861) was a 19th-century farmer and slave trader. He primarily traded in the Middle Tennessee region of the United States, but he also purchased slaves in Virginia, and sold people in Alabama. Among the children he bought and sold was nine-year-old Henry McDaniel, who as an adult became the father of Academy Award-winning actress Hattie McDaniel. Sim Eddins was killed in 1861 in a Mississippi River steamboat boiler explosion.

== Life and work ==
Eddins was born in Alabama around 1823. In 1847, "Sim Eddings" purchased three legally enslaved children, ages 11, nine and six, from a Spotsylvania, Virginia farmer named Robert Duerson, and resold them in Fayetteville, Tennessee to a farmer named John McDaniel. The middle child grew up and took the name Henry McDaniel; his daughter Hattie McDaniel in turn grew up to be the first African-American winner of an Academy Award, for her performance as Mammy, an enslaved woman who lived in antebellum Georgia, in Metro-Goldwyn-Mayer's 1939 Gone With the Wind. In 1852, a local paper reported that S. G. Eddins of Fayetteville, Tenn. was one of the newly arrived guests at the City Hotel in Richmond, Virginia. Eddins was a guest at Brown's Hotel in Washington, D.C. in September 1853. In 1854, in Hampton County, Virginia, Eddins bought an enslaved woman named Betsy and one of her children, separating Betsy from her husband and seven other sons, and taking them to another state for resale. In 1902, Betsy White was reunited with her surviving children.

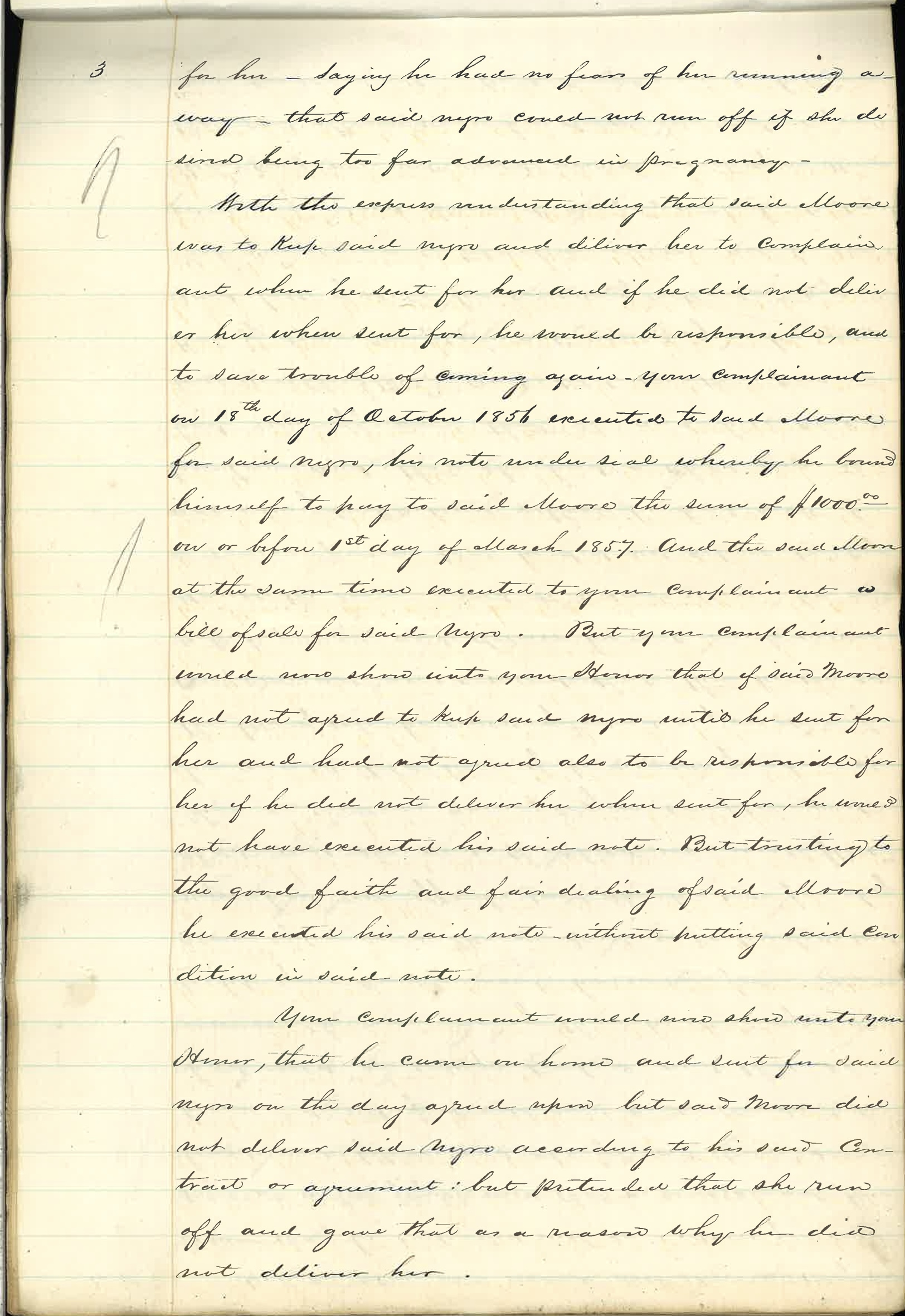
"...saying he had no fears of her running away—that said negro could not run off if she desired being too far advanced in pregnancy..." Simeon G. Eddins v. Alexander D. C. Moore (1858)

In 1858, Simeon G. Eddins and Alexander D.C. Moore sued each other over the planned sale of a pregnant enslaved woman named Beccy, who had been legally owned by Moore in Marshall County, Tennessee. The issues in dispute included the price, the agreement regarding delivery/pickup/holding of the woman, the additional value of her baby once he was born, whether or not she ran away or was hidden by her legal owner, and who owed who what amount after Beccy's apparent death.

In spring 1859, Eddings placed an advertisement in the Fayetteville (Tenn.) Observer announcing, "Negroes for Sale — I have just arrived from Virginia with FIFTY YOUNG NEGROES, 2 1/2 miles west of Fayetteville, consisting of men and women, boy and girls, which are for sale at reasonable prices. I will also exchange families, women with one, two, or three children; for single Negroes, either boys or girls. I, or one of my brothers, may be seen in Fayetteville, during the day, or at home at night. S. G. EDDINGS." The place where Eddins held these 50 people was likely a 380-acre property later described as "two and a half miles from Fayetteville, with a good dwelling-house, a mill, and other valuable improvements. The land being mostly creek bottom is unsurpassed by any in the county in fertility." Some of the "valuable improvements" may have been five "slave houses" counted by the 1860 census enumerator in association with the S. G. Eddins household. Also in May 1859, Eddins was appointed delegate to a Democratic political convention in Nashville. In autumn 1859, Eddins showed a harness mule at the Lincoln County Fair.

In February 1860, the Tennessee General Assembly named Eddins one of seven commissioners of the Fayetteville, Boonshill and Pulaski Turnpike. At the time of the 1860 U.S. federal census in June, S. G. Eddings, occupation "trader," lived in Fayetteville, Lincoln County, Tennessee. He owned real estate valued at US$16,500 (equivalent to $591,250 in 2025), and personal estate valued at US$47,000 (equivalent to $1,684,167 in 2025). He shared his household with two other men named Eddings, both born in Tennessee, one occupied as a "trader". A. H. Eddings was 31 years old and owned personal property worth $10,000; the youngest, T. T. Eddings was 27 and owned personal property worth $7,000. S. G. Eddins also appears on the 1860 slave schedules for Lincoln County as the legal owner of 40 people. Of the 40 slaves associated with S. G. Eddins, 11 were designated as "fugitives from the state," including a 13-year-old, a 12-year-old, a seven-year-old, two five-year-olds, and a one-year-old. Three enslaved teenagers were associated with the neighboring household of one Hugh Eddins. In January 1861, Eddins offered up number of people for sale in Greensboro, Alabama, including "six girls from 8 to 11 years old, very likely."

== Death ==
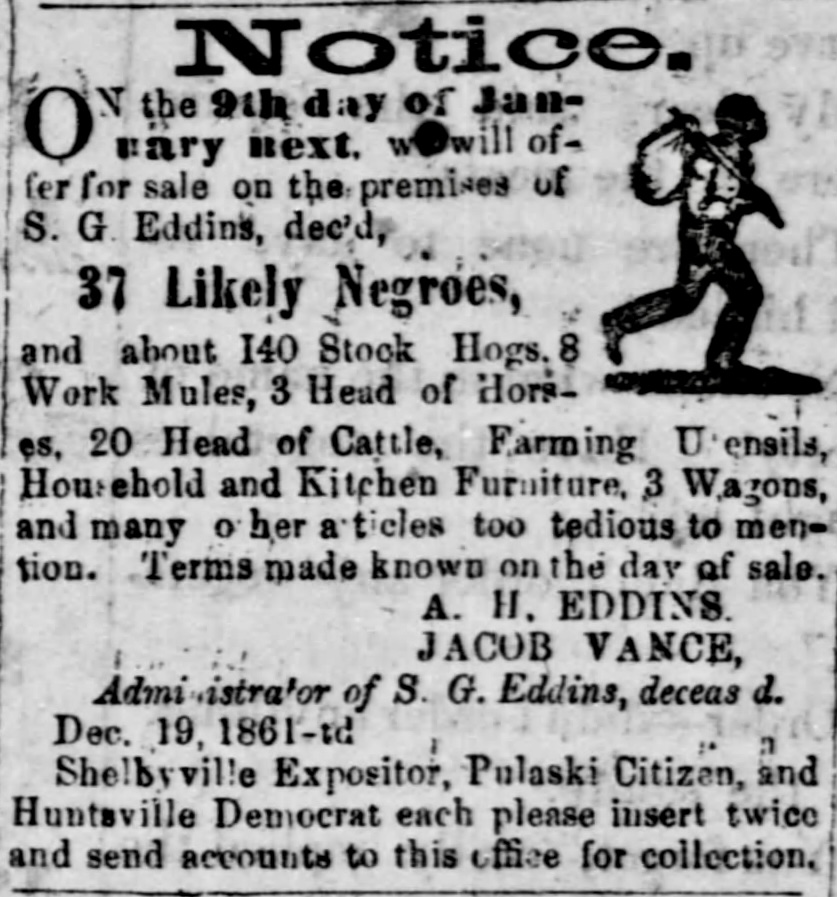
"For sale on the premises of S. G. Eddins, dec'd," Fayetteville Observer, December 19, 1861

In May 1861, Eddins was apparently aboard the steamship Kentucky on the Mississippi River near Columbia, Arkansas, when it suffered a boiler explosion. The Louisville Courier-Journal included Eddins on the casualty list: "S. G. Edings, Fayetteville, Tenn., badly scalded; will die." The Vicksburg, Mississippi Daily Evening Citizen reported that among those killed was "—— Edding, negro trader, Tennessee." The grievously injured Eddins, along with the injured Little brothers and other victims of the explosion, were transferred to another steamboat and taken to Greenville, Mississippi for medical attention.

In June 1861, Jacob Vance and A. H. Eddins published a notice in the Fayetteville Observer that they were administrators of the S. G. Eddins estate and that claims against the estate should be presented to them. In December 1861 the administrators listed for sale 140 stock hogs, eight work mules, three head of horses, 20 head of cattle, and 37 likely negroes.

In 1875, lands that had once belonged to Simeon G. Eddins, deceased, were to be sold to satisfy a judgment.

== See also ==
- List of American slave traders
- Slave markets and slave jails in the United States
- Slave quarters in the United States
- History of slavery in Tennessee
