= History of slavery in Tennessee =

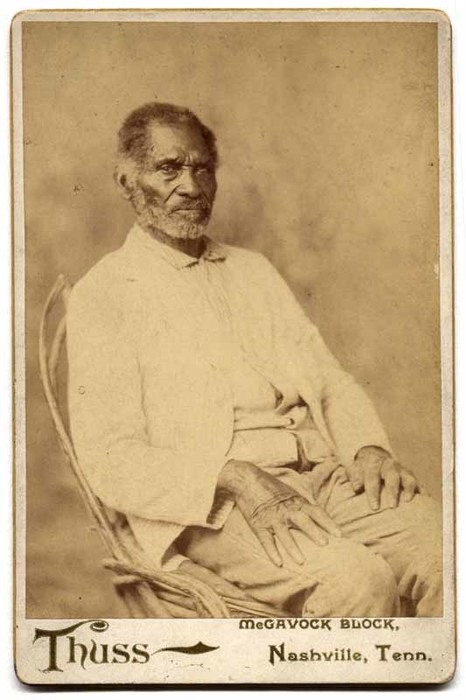
Alfred Jackson (1812–1901) was a carriage driver, stableman, tenant farmer, building caretaker, and tour guide at the Hermitage, Andrew Jackson's mansion in Tennessee, United States. He lived at the Hermitage longer than any other person, and was a valued living history resource in later life, especially after the Ladies' Hermitage Association took over the building in 1889.

The history of slavery in Tennessee began when it was the old Southwest Territory and thus the law regulating slavery in Tennessee was broadly derived from North Carolina law, and was initially comparatively "liberal." However, after statehood, as the fear of slave rebellion and the threat to slavery posed by abolitionism increased, the laws became increasingly punitive: after 1831, "punishments were increased and privileges and immunities were lessened and circumvented." Tennessee was one of five states that allowed slaves the right of a jury trial, and one of three states that never passed anti-literacy laws, although the punishment for forging a slave pass was up to 39 lashes.

Tennessee had a ban on interstate slave trading beginning in 1827 but it was broadly flouted and repealed in 1854. Bill Carey found evidence in newspapers of professional traders working in the state as early as 1820, including in smaller markets like Knoxville, Clarksville, Elizabethton, and Athens. Memphis, Tennessee was one of the central hubs of the interstate slave trade, along with Washington, Richmond, Charleston, Savannah, and New Orleans. Key Memphis traders included Byrd Hill, the Bolton brothers, the Little brothers, and the Forrest brothers. Nashville was a second-tier market, "advantageously situated for purchases in Kentucky and sales in northern Alabama and northeastern Mississippi....Much local and intra-state trading was a matter of course." East Tennessee manifested early abolitionism and colonization-movement activism but had the fewest number of slaves in that region.

== History ==
According to journalist-turned-local historian Bill Carey, who wrote a book examining the history of slavery in Tennessee through the lens of newspaper reports, slave sale ads, county-government notices in local papers, and runaway slave ads, not only did the city government of Nashville own slaves, in 1836 the state government "organized a lottery to raise money for internal improvements (mainly road construction). Lottery prizes included assets such as land, a farm, steamboats and five slaves: a 45-year-old man named Charles, a 43-year-old woman named Nancy and three girls named Matilda (12), Rebecca (11) and Maria (6)." Hiring out of slave laborers was extremely common and provided significant household income for their enslavers.

In Tennessee slavery officially ended in April of 1865, when the Unionist-controlled legislature ratified the Thirteenth Amendment.

As of 1914, the Supreme Court of Tennessee held that "ex-slaves had no inheritable blood" and thus could not transfer property by will to their siblings. The Supreme Court of the United States ruled in Jones vs. Jones that this was an unconstitutional violation of the 14th Amendment.

In 2022, voters passed a measure that removed language in Tennessee state laws that permitted slavery or involuntary servitude as a form of punishment, a change intended to prevent abuses in the use of convict labor.

== Gallery ==
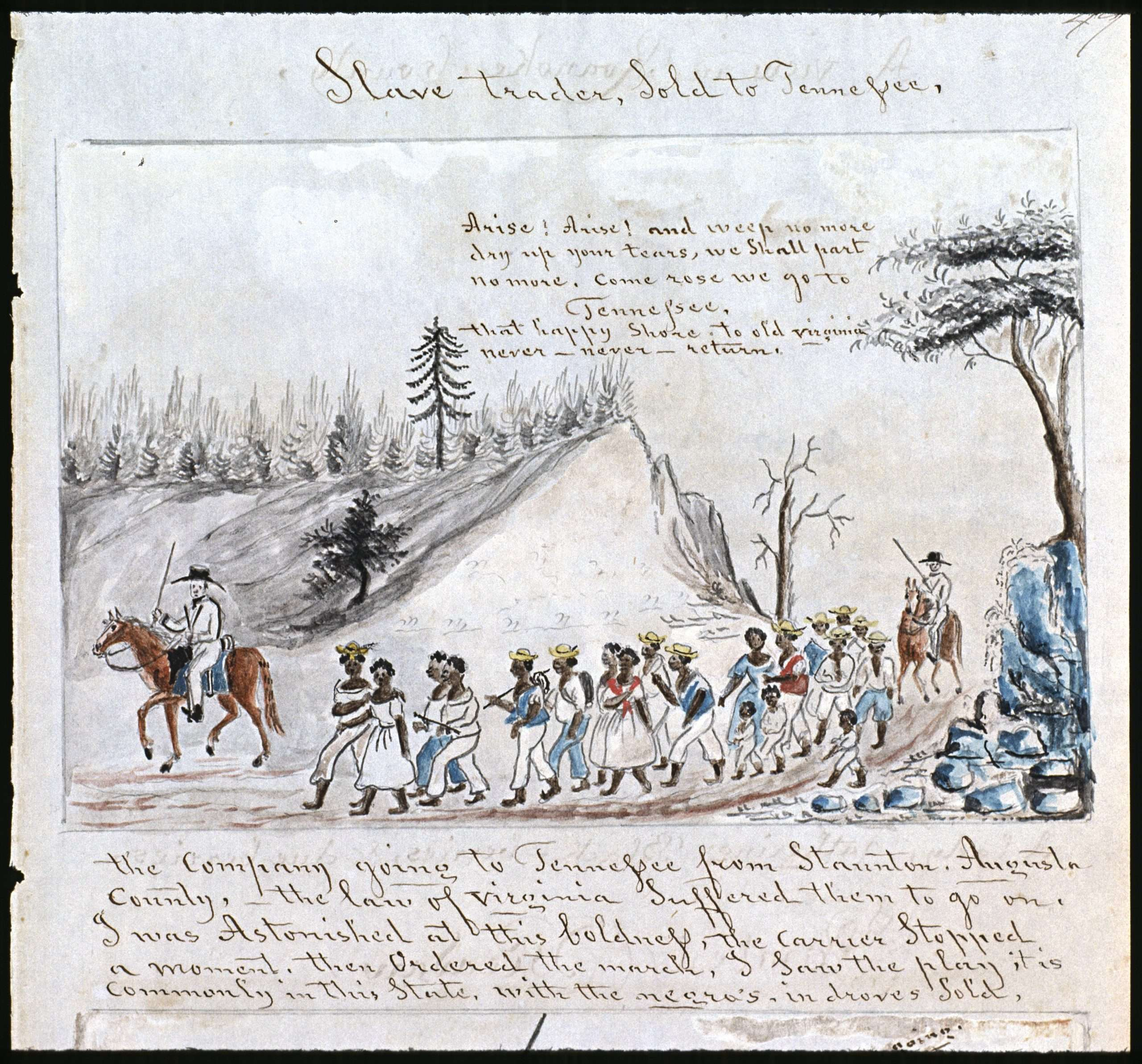
Slave trader, sold to Tennessee (watercolor image of overland coffle)

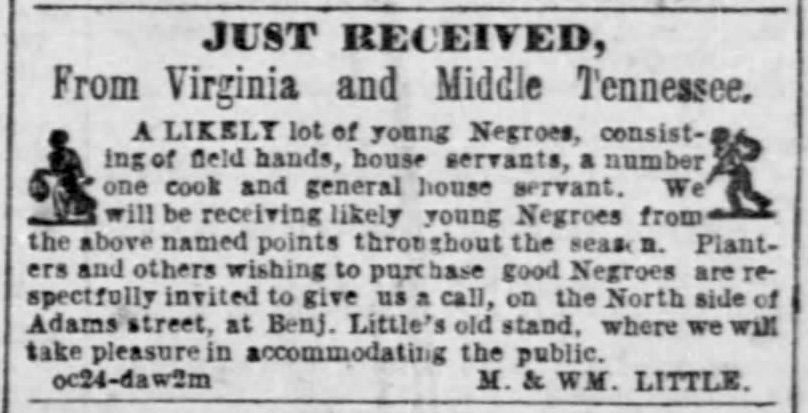
"Just received from Virginia and Middle Tennessee a likely lot of young Negroes..." (M & W.M. Little" Memphis Daily Appeal, January 6, 1857)

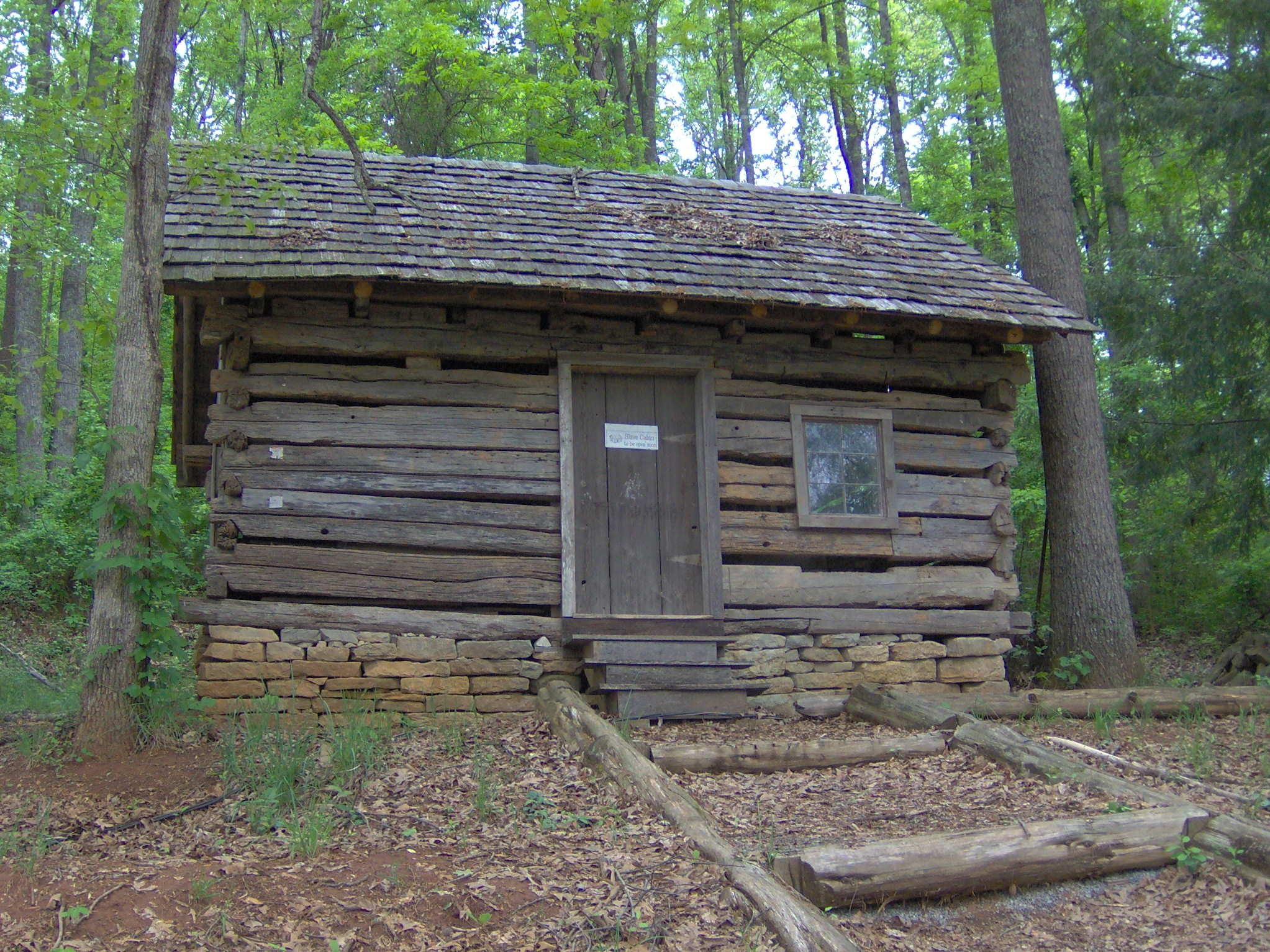
Slave cabin on display at the Museum of Appalachia in Norris, Tennessee; originally located on the Merritt family lands in Grainger County, Tennessee, built c. 1820

== See also ==
- African Americans in Tennessee § History
- Nashville Market House – Slave auction house and commercial building in Tennessee
- Memphis massacre of 1866
- History of slavery in the United States by state
- List of Tennessee slave traders
