= Jean Poingdestre =

Bailiff of Jersey

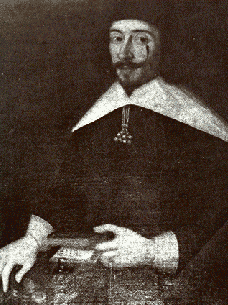
Jean Poingdestre

Jean Poingdestre (1609–1691) was a native of Jersey and a supporter of the Royalists in the English Civil War. He was born in the parish of St Saviour, at the Poingdestre fief of Grainville. He graduated from the University of Cambridge, and was made a fellow of Exeter College, Oxford in 1636, after studying Classics, specialising in Greek. Poingdestre was offered the job of Charles I's Latin Secretary (foreign translator) during the war, but seems to have declined. In 1648 he was forced to take refuge in Jersey, where he participated in the defence of Elizabeth Castle in 1651. After the Restoration, Poingdestre returned to England before becoming Lieutenant Bailiff of Jersey, resigning in 1676. During this time, he wrote Cæsarea or A Discourse of the Island of Jersey, a comprehensive survey of Jersey geography, customs, law, governance, folklore and trade.

An English lawyer, William Trumbull, visited Jersey and met Jean Poingdestre in 1676. He described him thus:

"Jean Pointdextre, Esquire is the next in Place, & was the late Lieut.Bailiff: He was admitted Jurate upon a Recomendatory Letter obtaind [sic] from above & putt into the place of Lieutenant ... He is a person of Experience & Capacity, as well in the businesse of the Publiq (having a good knowledge of the Court of England) as in that of the laws of that Country, which he has studdyed beyond any other, & digested the laws of Normandy into a Method sutable to the Practise of the Island. His great fault is His very passionate temper, ... He is undoubtedly the fittest person to help to Compile a Body of Law & is acquainted with all the Abuses in the Practise" [sic throughout]

The Poindexter family of America is descended from Jean's half nephew, George Poindexter.

== Sources ==
- Biographical portrait from the Jersey Legal Information Board
- Cæsarea or A Discourse of the Island of Jersey, Preface to the 1889 Société Jersiaise edition.
- Poindexter descendants association website. Contains an online version of Caesarea. (some erroneous information)
