= Poindexter & Little =

American slave-trading company

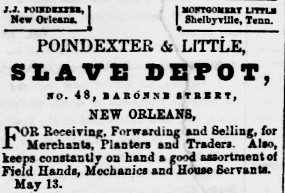
Poindexter & Little Slave Depot in 48 Baronne, New Orleans, Southern Confederacy, January 12, 1862

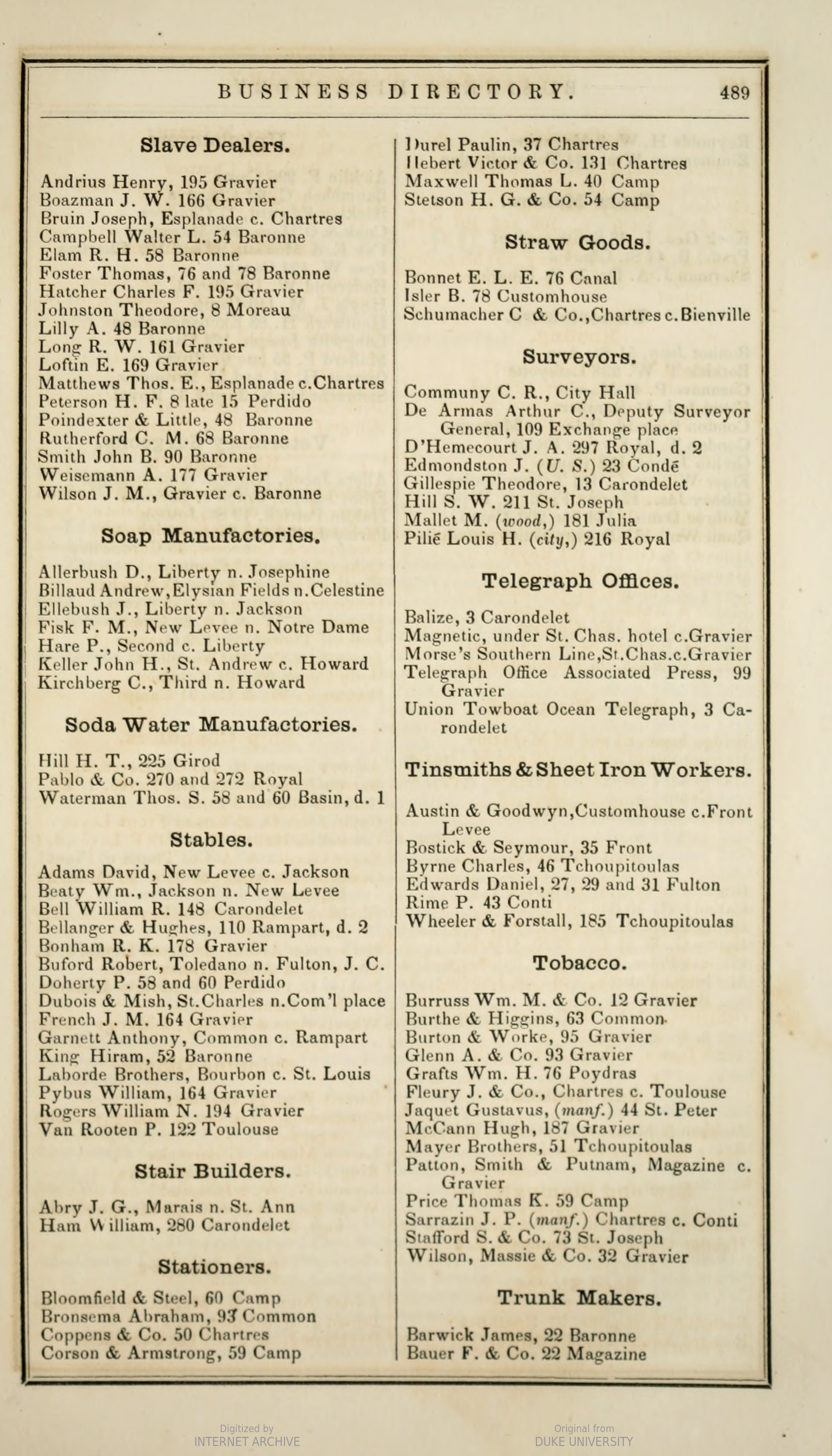
Poindexter & Little listed among other New Orleans slave dealers in the 1861 city directory

Poindexter & Little was a 19th-century American slave-trading company with operations in Tennessee and Louisiana. The principals were likely Thomas B. Poindexter, John J. Poindexter, Montgomery Little, William Little, Chauncey Little, and Benjamin Little. The Littles were brothers; the Poindexters were most likely brothers but possibly cousins. At the time of the 1860 census, Thomas B. Poindexter had the highest declared net worth of any person who listed their occupation as a slave trader in New Orleans. In 1861 they had a slave depot located at 48 Baronne in New Orleans.

In January 1862 the firm placed a classified ad for their slave depot in the Southern Confederacy newspaper, published in Atlanta, which advertised that Poindexter & Little's Slave Depot was "for receiving, forwarding, and selling, for merchants, planters, and traders. Also, keeps constantly on hand a good assortment of Field Hands, Mechanics, and Servants."

Two of the Little brothers died in the explosion of the steamboat Kentucky in 1861. Thomas B. Poindexter died from unknown causes in Tensas Parish, Louisiana in 1861. Montgomery Little joined the Confederate Army as an officer in the company led by fellow slave trader Bedford Forrest; Little was killed at the Battle of Thompson's Station in 1863. John J. Poindexter died in Mississippi or Louisiana in 1870.

== Slave depot ==
A biography of a survivor of American slavery, Allen Allensworth, described his experience at Poindexter & Little, where he was incarcerated in approximately 1855:

The next day, under a Negro driver, they were marched out of the slave mart here, double file to the steamboat landing at Memphis and placed on a packet for New Orleans. In due time they arrived and were driven like cattle to the Negro mart of Poindexter & Little, where there were over a thousand Negroes, each one waiting for a master. The rules and regulations of this mart were altogether different from those of Memphis. In this mart the Negroes were classified and seated on benches, as goods are arranged on shelves in a well regulated store. The cooks, mechanics, farm-hands, house-girls, seamstresses, wash-women, barbers, and boys each had his or her place. They were dressed in blue cloth clothing, tight-fitting jackets with flat brass buttons, and had the appearance of convicts. ¶ In this mart, or 'nigger' pen, as it was called, were confined over one thousand souls, it being one of the largest in New Orleans. These people were under strict rule and discipline. It was equipped with every known device and implement of torture. There was Uncle Billy with a gigantic physical frame, who looked as if he drank ox blood at every meal, whose business it was to give the cat-o'-nine-tails when a man or woman was assigned to the 'horse.' This 'horse' consisted of a four-legged litter: on it were rings and straps, used to secure the victim to it. Many times were men and women sent out to Uncle Billy to be punished, possibly in compliance with the instructions of their owners, who, when placing these folks, ordered that for so many days they were to be given from 10 to 50 lashes a day on their naked backs.

== See also ==
- Franklin & Armfield
- Slave trade in the United States
- Slave markets and slave jails in the United States
- List of American slave traders
