= List of structures in the United States built by slaves =

The following is a list of notable structures in the United States that were built, at least in part, by enslaved people:

- Blue Ridge Railroad (1849–1870) – A railroad project in the southern United States
- Cleveland and Chattanooga Railroad
- East Tennessee and Virginia Railroad
- Fort Jefferson (Florida) – Military installation on the Dry Tortugas
- Memphis and Hernando Plank Road – An important road connecting Memphis and Hernando, Mississippi
- Monticello – The plantation home of Thomas Jefferson, located in Virginia
- Montpelier (Orange, Virginia) – The estate of James Madison, fourth President of the United States
- Mount Vernon – George Washington's plantation home in Virginia
- Naval Air Station Pensacola – A major training base for the U.S. Navy in Florida
- Old Warren County Courthouse – Historic building, now a museum, in Vicksburg, Mississippi
- Plantation complexes in the Southern United States – Large agricultural estates worked by enslaved laborers
- South Carolina Canal and Railroad Company – One of the earliest railroads in the southern United States
- Southside Railroad (Virginia) – An early railroad in Virginia
- United States Capitol – The building housing the U.S. Congress in Washington, D.C.
- University of the South at Sewanee
- White House – The official residence and workplace of the President of the United States
- Fort Sumter – The site of the Battle of Fort Sumter, the first battle in the American Civil War

== See also ==
- Slavery in the United States
- History of slavery in Virginia
- List of plantations in the United States
