= John J. Poindexter =

American slave trader (~1816–1870)

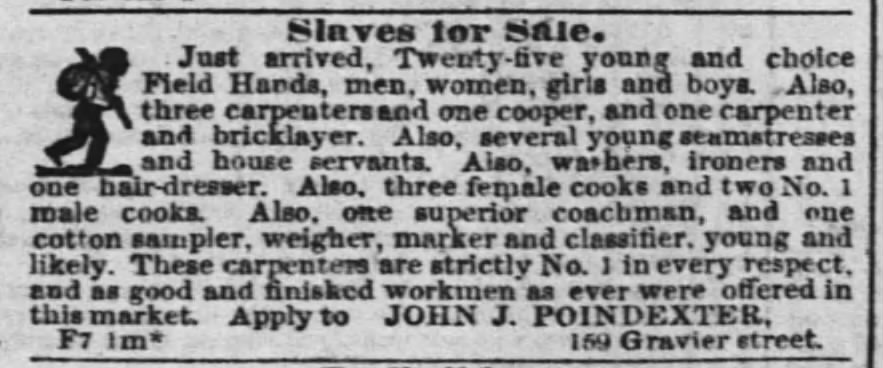
- "Slaves for Sale" New Orleans Times-Picayune, February 27, 1856

John Jenkins Poindexter (c. 1816–1870) was an American slave trader, commission merchant, school commissioner, and steamboat master of Louisiana and Mississippi. He served in the Mexican-American War as a junior officer in the Mississippi Rifles. The historic John J. Poindexter House in Jackson, Mississippi, was commissioned for the young Poindexter family and designed in the 1840s by architect William Nichols.

== Biography ==
Born in Virginia around 1816, Poindexter may be related to the family that produced George Poindexter, an early Mississippi governor, and James Preston Poindexter, an abolitionist minister of Ohio. It is unknown when Poindexter relocated to what was then the southwestern frontier, but a 22-year-old J. J. Poindexter, occupation mechanic, appears on the manifest of a ship called Columbia traveling between Galveston and New Orleans in 1838.

Poindexter appeared in the 1840 U.S. census as a resident of Hinds County, Mississippi. Poindexter married Mary A. Cohea in Hinds County, Mississippi in May 1840. Her father Perry Cohea was a Mississippi building commissioner. In 1840 Poindexter was in partnership with M. E. Thomas as a wholesale and commission merchant of Jackson, Mississippi. The John J. Poindexter House in Jackson, Mississippi was designed by architect William Nichols on a commission made by Poindexter's father-in-law. Mary Cohea Poindexter died near Jackson, Mississippi in January 1843, leaving behind a surviving infant.

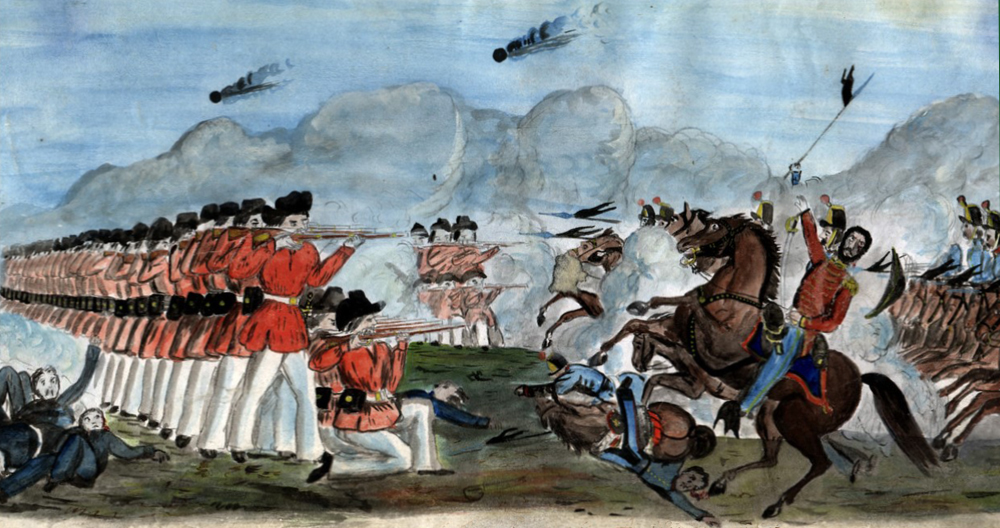
Watercolor of The Defeat of the Mexican Lancers by the Mississippi Rifles by Samuel Chamberlain (c. 1860)

Poindexter joined the Masonic lodge in Jackson in 1844. John J. Poindexter served as a second lieutenant or 3rd corporal in Company H, the Vicksburg Volunteers of the 1st Regiment of Mississippi Rifles, known colloquially as Jefferson Davis' regiment. That regiment was organized to serve in the Mexican–American War for a year, from June 1846 to June 1847. Poindexter may have been discharged in November 1846.

As of the 1850 census, Poindexter lived in Tensas Parish, Louisiana with his nine-year-old son; the head of the household was Thomas B. Poindexter. Poindexter was evidently selling people as slaves by 1852 because a fugitive slave ad placed in the Daily Delta that year offers a $20 reward for the recovery of a man named Primus who could read and write and had been purchased from John J. Poindexter. In May 1857 Poindexter announced "Just received, Fifty young and likely Field Men and Women, Also five Carpenters, three Blacksmiths, one No. 1 Barber, three Seamstresses, four fine Male House Servants and Carriage Drivers, and one Cooper. For sale at the lowest market rates by J. J. POINDEXTER, 71 and 73 Baronne street." In October 1857 Poindexter was seeking the return of an 18-year-old named Ruffin with "lips very much scarred" who was the legal property of Daniel Craig of Arkansas. Also in October 1857 a 21-year-old "griffe color" man named Simon escaped from Poindexter's slave depot at 63 and 65 Barrone Street in New Orleans. Simon was described as slow of speech and "badly scarred on the back from having been whipped." Poindexter offered a reward of $25 if Simon was returned or deposited in any of the city jails.

In 1860 John J. Poindexter appeared in the federal census of New Orleans with occupation "slave depot," and personal property worth $40,000. His nearest neighbors were the households of his business partner Montgomery Lyttle, and another slave trader, R.H. Elam. He was listed on the 1860 slave schedules as personally owning three people. The Poindexter & Little slave depot in New Orleans appears in the 1914 biography of Allen Allensworth, a survivor of American slavery:

The next day, under a Negro driver, they were marched out of the slave mart here, double file to the steamboat landing at Memphis and placed on a packet for New Orleans. In due time they arrived and were driven like cattle to the Negro mart of Poindexter & Little, where there were over a thousand Negroes, each one waiting for a master. The rules and regulations of this mart were altogether different from those of Memphis. In this mart the Negroes were classified and seated on benches, as goods are arranged on shelves in a well regulated store. The cooks, mechanics, farm-hands, house-girls, seamstresses, wash-women, barbers, and boys each had his or her place. They were dressed in blue cloth clothing, tight-fitting jackets with flat brass buttons, and had the appearance of convicts. ¶ In this mart, or 'nigger' pen, as it was called, were confined over one thousand souls, it being one of the largest in New Orleans. These people were under strict rule and discipline. It was equipped with every known device and implement of torture. There was Uncle Billy with a gigantic physical frame, who looked as if he drank ox blood at every meal, whose business it was to give the cat-o'-nine-tails when a man or woman was assigned to the 'horse.' This 'horse' consisted of a four-legged litter: on it were rings and straps, used to secure the victim to it. Many times were men and women sent out to Uncle Billy to be punished, possibly in compliance with the instructions of their owners, who, when placing these folks, ordered that for so many days they were to be given from 10 to 50 lashes a day on their naked backs.

In April 1861, in his capacity as the Common Schools Commissioner of Arkansas County, Arkansas, Poindexter offered for sale two sections of land, totalling 1,280 acres. (These may have been the school sections created under the Public Land Survey System.)

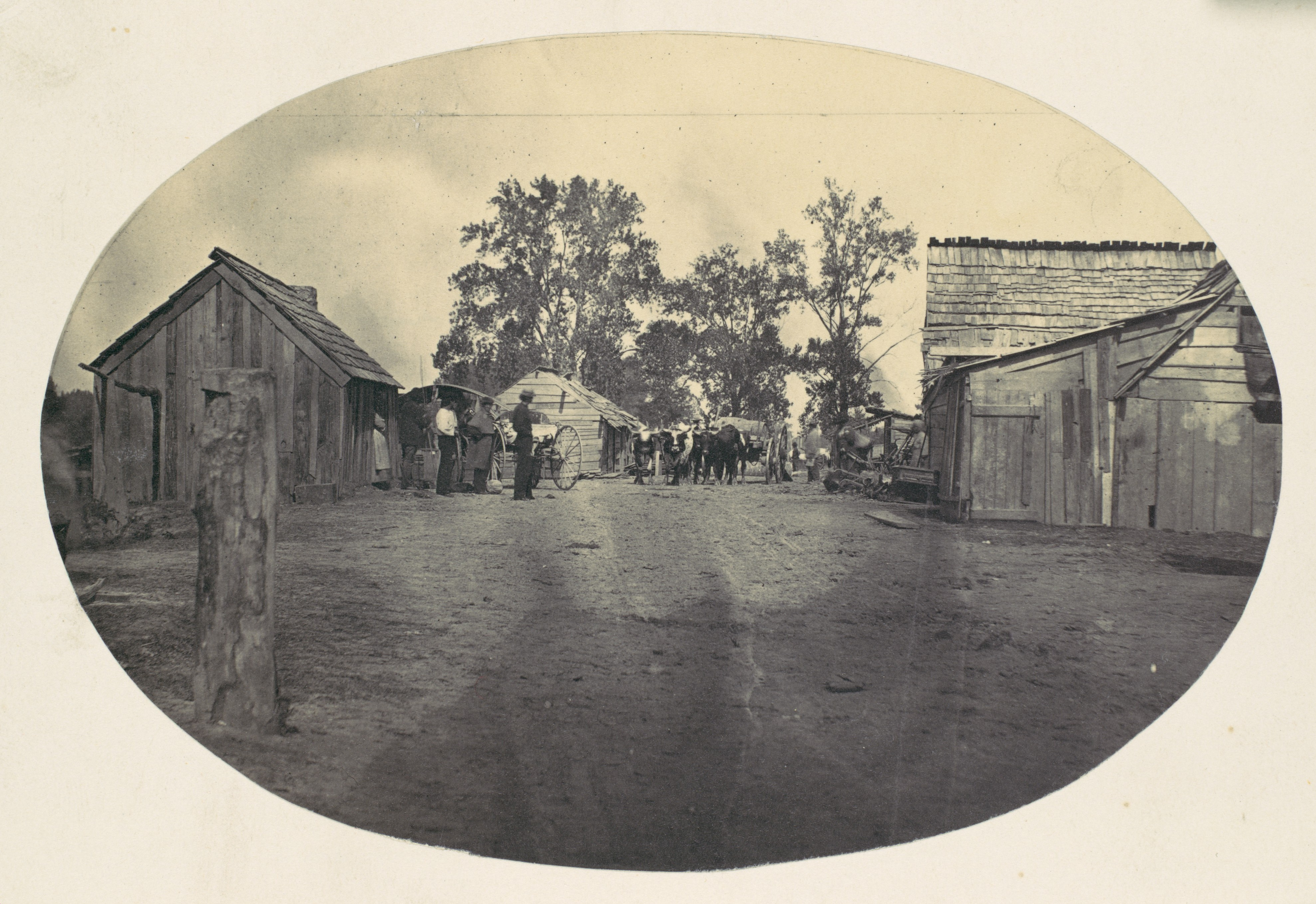
Skipwith's Landing, Mississippi River c. 1864

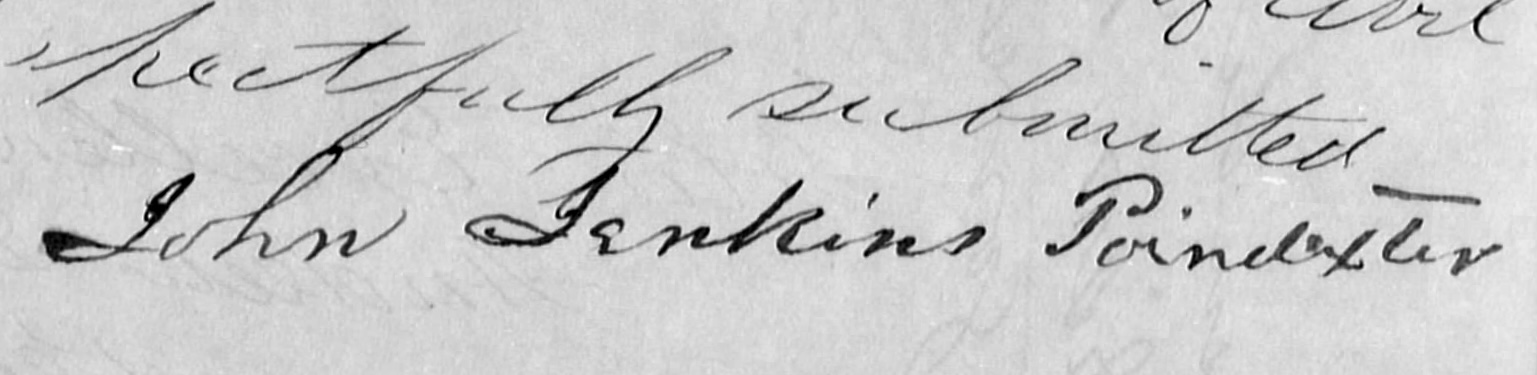
John Jenkins Poindexter signature, Confederate amnesty application, 1865

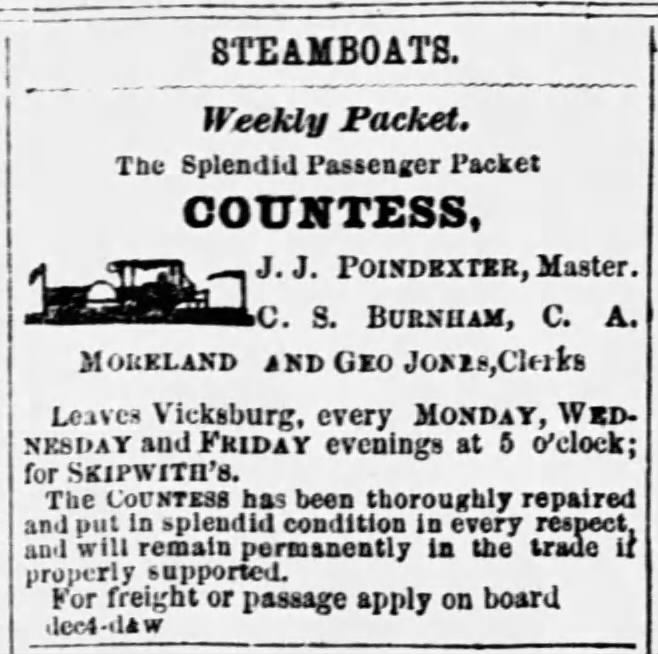
"The Splendid Passenger Packet Countess, J. J. Poindexter, master," Vicksburg Daily Times, July 23, 1870

In his Confederate amnesty application Poindexter claimed had taken no active part in the rebellion against the United States but had removed with his steamboat to the Red River where he remained for the duration. As of June 1870 Poindexter was master of a steamboat called Countess that traveled between Vicksburg and Skipwith's Landing. Poindexter may have died in July or August 1870 as notices about settling the J.J. Poindexter estate begin appearing in New Orleans newspapers in August 1870. John J. Poindexter was buried in Mississippi.

Thomas B. Poindexter, with whom John J. Poindexter lived at the time of the 1850 census, had the highest net worth of the 34 men identified as a slave trader in the 1860 New Orleans census. (Note: For more on Thomas B. Poindexter, see Judith Kelleher Schafer's Slavery, the civil law, and the Supreme Court of Louisiana (1994), page 290.)

== See also ==
- CSS Countess
- List of American slave traders
- History of slavery in Mississippi
- History of slavery in Louisiana
