= Thomas B. Poindexter =

American slave trader (~1806–1861)

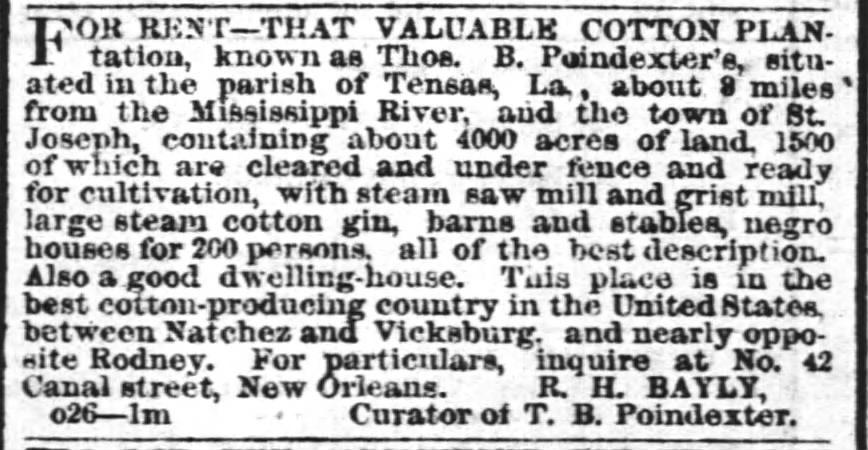
- "FOR RENT–That valuable cotton plantation... " New Orleans Times-Picayune, November 17, 1865
- Born: ~1804; Virginia
- Died: 1861; Tensas Parish, Louisiana, U.S.
- Other name: T.B. Poindexter
- Occupations: Slave trader, cotton planter, racehorse owner

Thomas B. Poindexter was an American slave trader and cotton planter. He had the highest net worth, US$350,000 (equivalent to $12,541,667 in 2025), of the 34 active resident slave traders indexed as such in the 1860 New Orleans census, ahead of Jonathan M. Wilson and Bernard Kendig.

== Biography ==
Little is known about Poindexter's family of origin, but he reported that he was born about 1804 in Virginia. He was possibly born in Halifax, Virginia on June 17, 1804. He may be related to the Virginia Poindexter family that produced George Poindexter, an early Mississippi governor, and James Preston Poindexter, an abolitionist minister of Ohio.

=== Slave trading ===
In 1827, Thomas B. Poindexter of Huntsville, Alabama trafficked a 16-year-old black girl named Frances from Mobile, Alabama to New Orleans on the ship Columbia. Poindexter is listed as the "shipper" of slaves from Charleston, South Carolina, on the ship John David Mongin bound for Savannah, Georgia, in 1829. In 1834, Thomas B. Poindexter of Columbia, South Carolina, shipped nine people from Charleston to New Orleans on the ship Crawford: Paul, Harry, Frank, Bacchus, Jordan, Jupiter, Reuben, Hinney, Selina, all of whom were in the age range of 16 to 36 that slave traders marketed as "prime". In 1844 traders William H. Williams and Thomas B. Poindexter both used the Victorine to ship enslaved people from Baltimore to New Orleans. Poindexter shipped Thomas Williams, a 19-year-old black man, and the Hall family, consisting of Sylvester and Kitty Hall, ages 45 and 48; Milly, Sally, and Charity Hall, who were 19, 16, and 11 years old; and four-month-old John Hall, who was most likely Milly's son and Sylvester and Kitty's grandson. In 1847, Poindexter shipped five twentysomethings—Alfred, John Bennet, Amos, John, and Mary Ann—from Charleston to New Orleans on the Adelaide. In 1848 Poindexter and the Campbells used the ship Delaware to send slaves from Baltimore to New Orleans; Poindexter's name is associated with three people on the manifest: Willis Alexander, Charles Williams, and Clarissa Gross.

=== Cotton plantation ===
According to the U.S. Bureau of Land Management tract books, Thomas B. Poindexter purchased many tracts of land in the Oauchita District of Louisiana in the 1840s.

As of the 1850 census, Poindexter was enumerated in Tensas Parish, Louisiana with John Jenkins Poindexter (likely his brother or cousin) and the widowed John J.'s nine-year-old son. According to an advertisement placed in the New Orleans Crescent in 1865, Poindexter's 4,000-acre (1,600 ha; 6.3 mi^{2}) Tensas Parish plantation was located about 3 miles (4.8 km) inland from St. Joseph on the Mississippi River, in an area said to be "the best cotton-producing country in the United States, between Natchez and Vicksburg, and nearly opposite Rodney." The property had "a good dwelling house" and "negro houses for 200 persons". Of the 4,000 total acres, 1,500 had been cleared and put "under fence and ready for cultivation, with steam saw mill and grist mill, large steam cotton gin, barns and stables...all of the best description".

=== 1860 ===
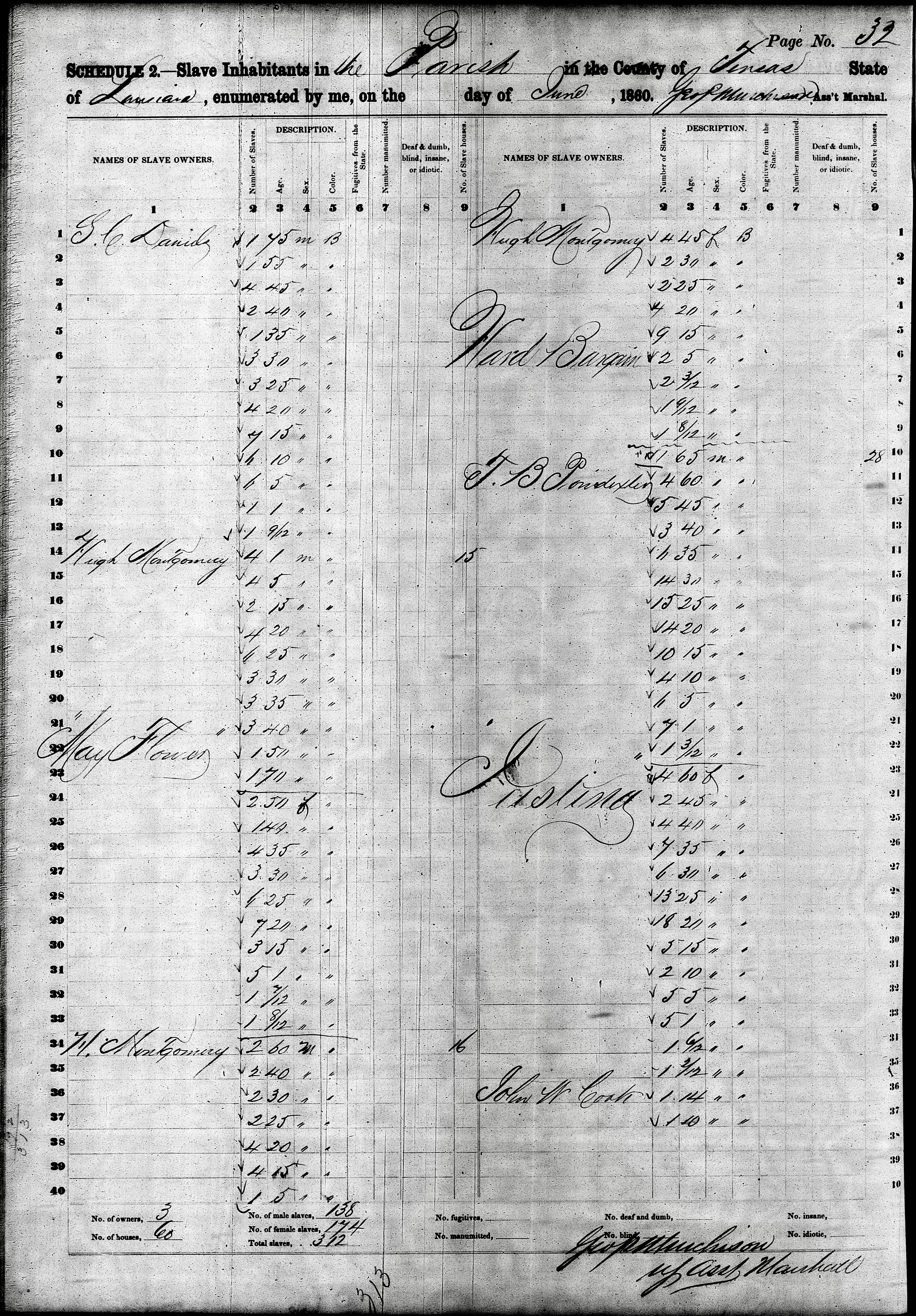
Slave schedule for Tensas Parish, Louisiana estates including T. B. Poindexter, 1860

In 1860, T. B. Poindexter was listed in the New Orleans census as a resident of the 11th ward, having the occupation of slave trader, owning real estate valued at US$200,000 (equivalent to $7,166,667 in 2025) and personal property worth US$150,000 (equivalent to $5,375,000 in 2025). According to an analysis of historian Richard Tansey, Poindexter was the richest of the 34 men listed in the 1860 census of New Orleans as being slave traders. (Note: For a retired slave trader of New Orleans who was richer still, see Shadrack F. Slatter.) Poindexter is also listed as a "non-resident" of Tensas Parish, in the area of the Waterproof, Louisiana post office, who was an owner of real estate valued at US$132,000 (equivalent to $4,730,000 in 2025) and personal property worth US$164,000 (equivalent to $5,876,667 in 2025). The other white residents of Poindexter's Tensas Parish household are a 25-year-old carpenter from Virginia named W. T. Gallsined and a 40-year-old from Ireland with no listed occupation named Michael Spelton. The slave schedules show that 98 people were enslaved at Thomas B. Poindexter's plantation. In 1860 Thomas B. Poindexter's brother or cousin John J. Poindexter appeared in the federal census of New Orleans with occupation "slave depot," and personal property worth $40,000. His nearest neighbors were the households of his business partner Montgomery Lyttle, and another slave trader, R. H. Elam. The Poindexter & Little slave depot in New Orleans is described in the 1914 biography of Allen Allensworth, a survivor of American slavery.

In November 1860, Poindexter signed an open letter that described Abraham Lincoln as a Black Republican and called upon Louisiana governor T. O. Moore "to secure our rights" (by calling a secession convention and exiting the Union, etc.)

=== Death and estate ===
Thomas B. Poindexter died from unknown causes in Tensas Parish, Louisiana sometime before September 1861, (Note: Poindexter's exact date of death may be September 9, 1861.) when his estate was inventoried. In November 1861, New Orleans auctioneer Norbert Vignié listed for sale "at 10 1/2 o'clock A.M. at the late residence of the deceased at the corner of St. Charles, or Nayades, and St. Andrew streets...7 bbl. fine ol Whiskey, Claret Wine, White do., Madeira do., Port do., Sherry do., 1 bbl. of White Sugar, lot of empty bottles" and two scrips for the Merchants Insurance Company. In January 1862, Vignié advertised that he would sell "at the Merchants' and Auctioneers' Exchange, Royal street, slaves and property belonging to the succession of Thos. B. Poindexter and Cyprien Lorio. Unreserved and positive Sales." Estate sales between November 1861 and March 1862 yielded over US$54,000 (equivalent to $1,741,500 in 2025). According to research by historian Judith Schafer, after Poindexter's slaves were freed by the Emancipation Proclamation "many of them left his plantation, carrying off most of its movable property. A few months later, Confederate cavalry burned all of the cotton stored on the property, to keep it out of enemy hands, and confiscated the plantation's corn to feed their horses". A legal summary states that the corn raised on the plantation in 1863 was "taken by hostile forces". The executor of the estate later sued for a commission percentage based on the 1861 valuation of the slaves, cotton, corn, etc. A lower court granted the petition, a higher court overturned the lower court and reduced the commission by about 80 percent."

=== Locations and possible relations ===
There were letters waiting for Thomas B. Poindexter at the Augusta, Georgia, post office in 1828 and 1830, and at Natchez, Mississippi, in 1842. Letters were also waiting for Thomas B. Poindexter and Nathaniel H. Poindexter in Augusta in 1830. Sometime between 1836 and 1843, Thomas B. Poindexter and John J. Poindexter were both involved in purchase and transfer of slaves from a semi-insolvent estate, which later resulted in lawsuits that went to the Supreme Court of Mississippi. Similarly, in 1851, a Supreme Court of Alabama decision about the correct endorsement of a "bill of exchange" involved both Thomas B. and John J. Poindexter.

In 1855, 19-year-old Gertrude R. Poindexter, daughter of Thomas B. Poindexter, married Thomas D. Loney in Orleans Parish.

=== Horses ===
Poindexter seemingly had an interest in horse racing, including at the Metairie Course in Louisiana. The University of Virginia Libraries holds a letter to turfman William Ransom Johnson dated January 18, 1852 "from Thomas B. Poindexter, Louisville, Kentucky, which discusses a racehorse, 'Sally Morgan.' The writer relates that it was the wish of Johnson's father to have the horse sent to Boston, where she is now a successful runner, and also to give the horse to himself." He is listed in the American Stud Book as the owner of a horse named Nannie Clark.

== See also ==
- List of American slave traders
- History of slavery in Louisiana
