= Poindexter =

Poindexter may refer to:

- Poindexter (surname), a Jèrriais surname; origin and a list of people with the name

== Characters ==
- Poindexter, a character in the animated TV series Felix the Cat (1959–1962), whose name has become a slang term meaning "a bookish or socially unskilled person"
- Poindexter March III, otherwise known as Nick Stokes, a character in the film Lay That Rifle Down.
- Poindexter, the main character in the film The People Under the Stairs
- Arnold Poindexter, a character in the film Revenge of the Nerds and its sequels
- Special Agent Benjamin Poindexter, a Marvel supervillain known under the alias Bullseye

== Places in the United States ==
- Poindexter, Georgia, an unincorporated community also known as Murrays Crossroads
- Poindexter, Virginia, an unincorporated community
- Poindexter Village, Columbus, Ohio, a historic public housing complex

== Other uses ==
- Poindexter (mixtape), a 2009 mixtape by Childish Gambino

== See also ==
- SS Alan Poindexter, a spaceship involved in Cygnus CRS OA-5
