= Memphis and Hernando Plank Road =

1850s American toll road

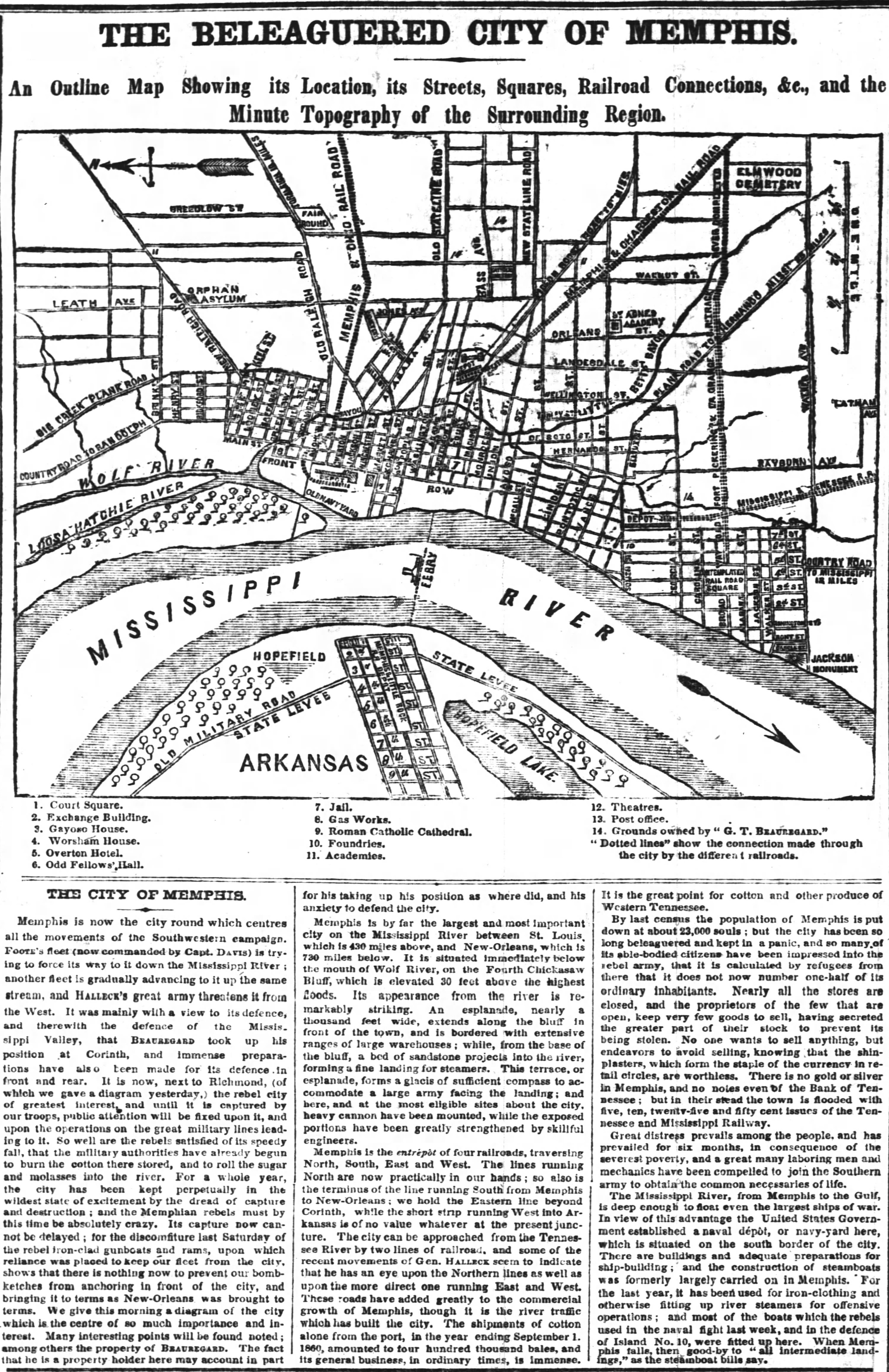
1862 map from the New York Times showing the plank road route out of Memphis

The Memphis and Hernando Plank Road was a toll road between Memphis, Tennessee, and Hernando, Mississippi, in the United States. The plank road was built and opened in approximately 1852. The road was originally known as the Panola and DeSoto Plank Road. The distance covered was 22 miles (35 km). There was a toll gate every eight miles (13 km). The road passed by large plantations, colonial-style homes, and small farms. At the same time a similar toll road, known as the Memphis and Pigeon Roost Plank Road, was built between Memphis and Holly Springs, Mississippi.

== History ==
There were several plank roads built out of Memphis in the 1850s; in addition to the roads to Mississippi there were roads to Big Creek and Raleigh in Shelby County, and LaGrange in Fayette County, Tennessee.

In August 1851, Thomas Peters and slave trader Byrd Hill advertised that they sought to hire out between 50 and 100 enslaved male laborers to build the road. According to a 1921 reminiscence by a longtime citizen of White Haven, Tennessee, the road was "constructed by grading the roadbed and laying two and one-half-inch oak planks on stringers of timber laid flush with the roadbed. It made an excellent highway and made hauling and travel easy." Col. Charles Edward Ware may have been surveyor and contractor for both the Hernando and Pigeon Roost roads. Polly Turner Cancer of Marshall County, Mississippi told a WPA Slave Narratives recorder that the plank roads to Memphis had been considered dangerous places, known to be frequented by bandits: "In dose days hit was dang'us to travel 'cause dere was so many robbers 'festin' de roads; when de folks was fixin' to go to Memphis dey wud all go in gangs; dey wud meet at de Ferry at Wyatt an' go togedder; dey wud all have fierce dogs an' guns; Marster wud tell 'bout ridin' on de Plank Roads to Memphis." The opening of the Tennessee and Mississippi Railroad train station in Hernando in 1856 significantly cut into the plank road's revenues. The road may have been the site of a duel held 12 miles south of Memphis in which Alonzo Greenlaw killed Henderson Taylor.

During the American Civil War, the death of a civilian named William H. White who lived along the Memphis and Hernando plank road led to an exchange of tersely worded letters between U.S. Army General William T. Sherman and the Confederate Army commander in Mississippi J. C. Pemberton. According to a WPA-produced history of DeSoto County, Mississippi, Nathan Bedford Forrest and his men rode the plank road into Memphis at the time of their infamous 1864 raid.

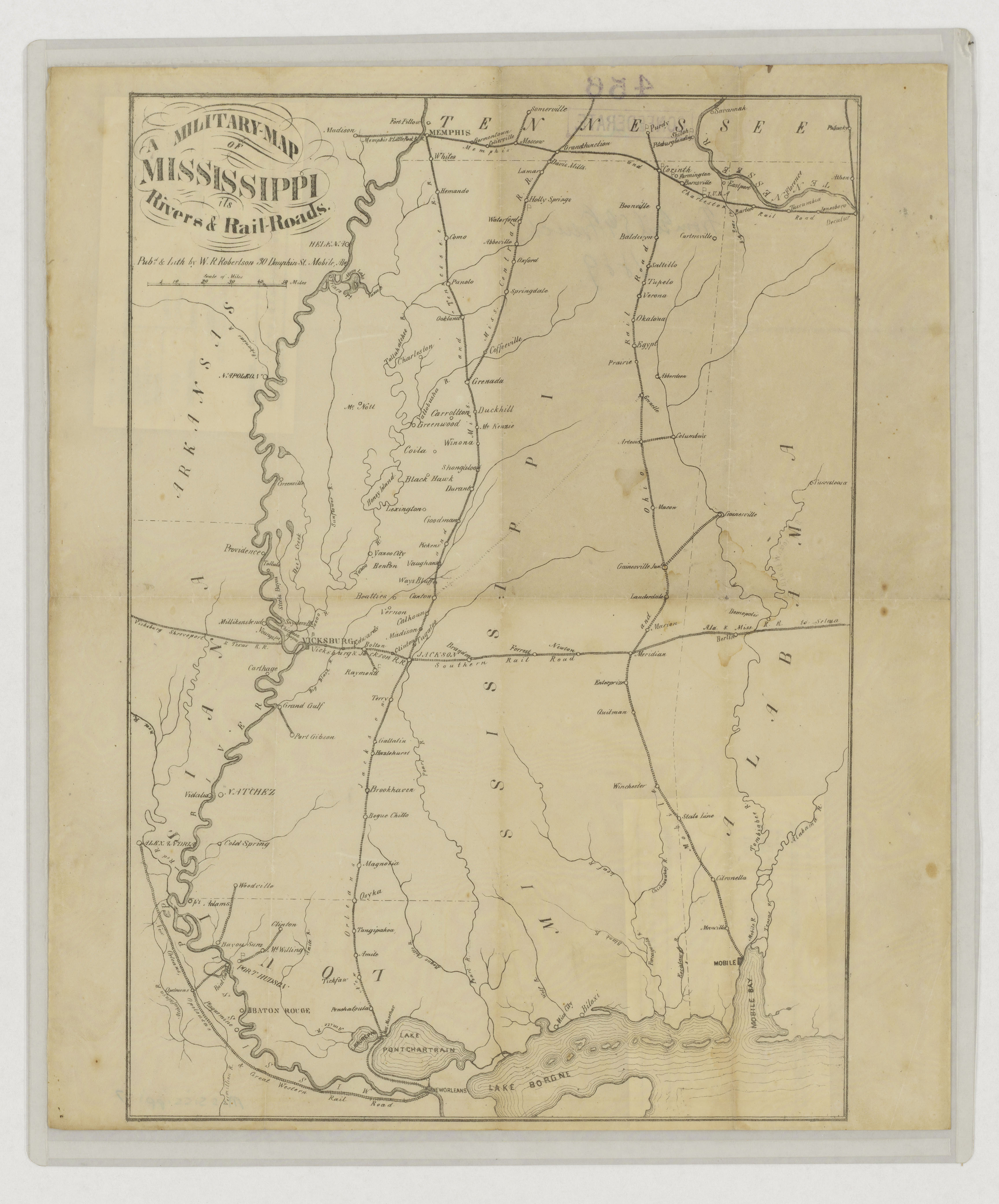
Mississippi in 1861, showing the train route from Memphis through White's Station through Panola and Hernando to Grenada

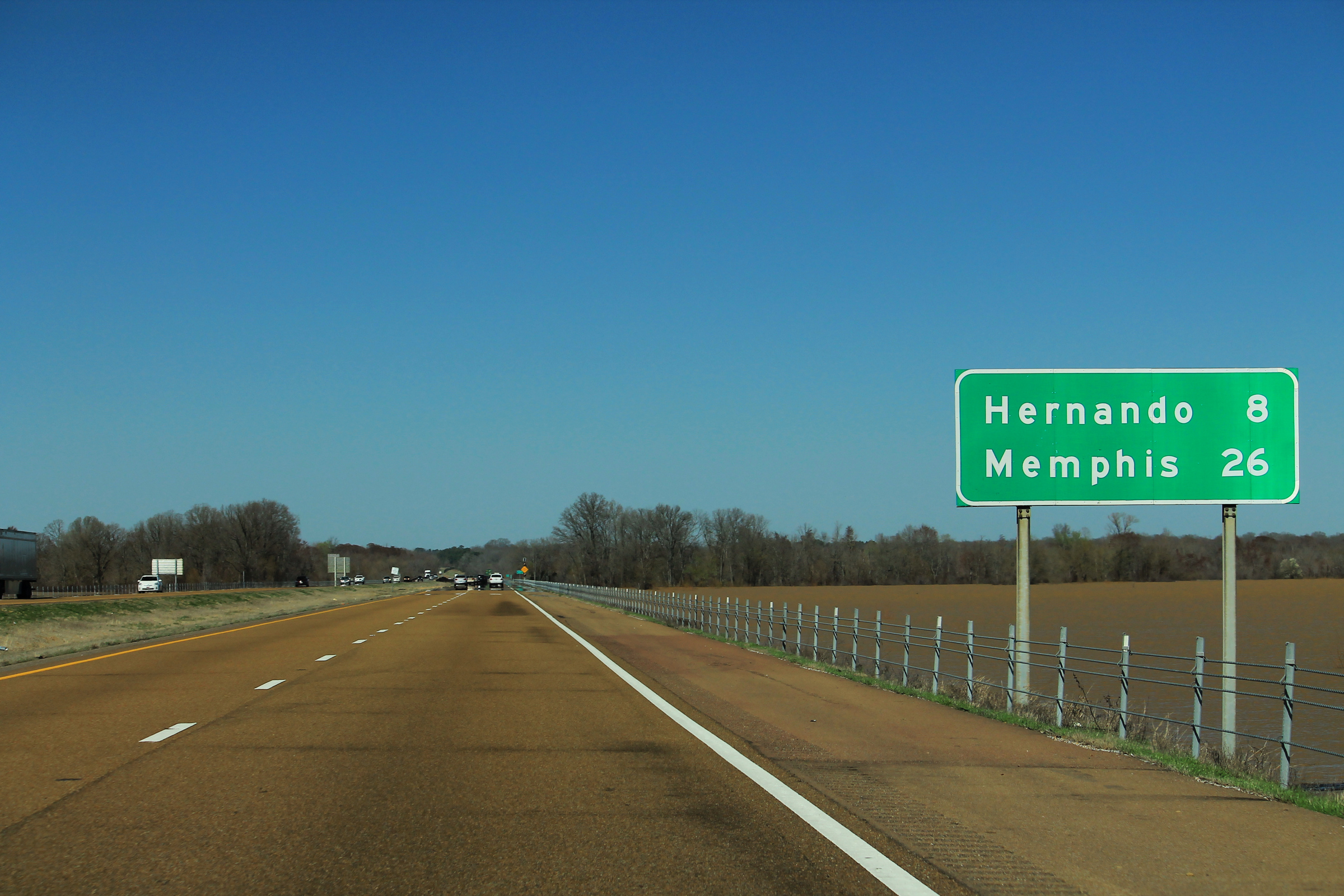
I-55 north

The present-day Interstate 55 follows the same route as the old Memphis to Hernando plank road.

== See also ==
- Plank Road Boom
- Transportation in Memphis, Tennessee
- List of structures in the United States built by slaves
