= Montgomery Little =

American slave trader (1825–1863)

- Born: July 18, 1825; North Carolina, U.S.
- Died: March 8, 1863 (aged 37); Williamson County, Tennessee, U.S.
- Cause of death: Killed in action
- Occupations: Plantation manager, slave trader, cavalry officer

Montgomery Little (July 18, 1825 – March 8, 1863) was an American slave trader and a Confederate Army cavalry officer who served in Nathan Bedford Forrest's Escort Company. Little was killed in action during the American Civil War at the Battle of Thompson's Station.

== Early life and slave trading ==
The youngest of 12 children, Little was born in Rowan, North Carolina, when his father, Samuel Little, was 48 and his mother, Elizabeth Boone, was 39. His mother (who was a first cousin, once removed, to Daniel Boone) died in 1827. When Little was two, the family moved to Smith County, Tennessee, where, in 1829, his father died, leaving Little an orphan at age four. According to the authors of The campaigns of Lieut.-Gen. N.B. Forrest, and of Forrest's cavalry, "An elder brother secured him a good education, including at least one term at Saint Mary's College, Kentucky. Subsequently, he resided in Mississippi, superintending plantations there for several years and until he removed to Memphis and entered into business with his brother." Harriet Beecher Stowe quoted from two 1852 newspaper advertisements by Benj. Little of Memphis in her 1853 non-fiction polemic A Key to Uncle Tom's Cabin, one offering 75 "assorted No. A 1 negroes" for sale ("call soon if you want to get the first choice") and one offering "cash for negroes" at Byrd Hill's old stand. According to historian Frederic Bancroft several Memphis slave traders started out as horse traders: Nathan Bedford Forrest, M. C. Cayce, and Ben Little.

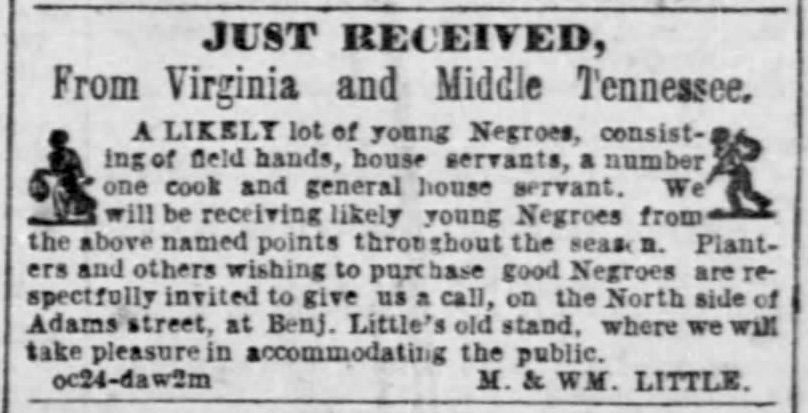
Slaves for sale by M & Wm. Little at Benj. Little's old stand, Memphis Daily Appeal, January 6, 1857

In 1860, Montgomery Little lived in what was then the third ward of Orleans, Louisiana, United States. At the time of the 1860 census, his occupation was listed as "slave yard," and his household consisted of his older brother, Chauncey Little, and three other men, who all worked as clerks. In 1861 he was operating in partnership with John J. Poindexter, with a slave dealership located at 48 Baronne in New Orleans. In January 1862 the firm placed a classified ad for their slave depot in the Southern Confederacy newspaper, published in Atlanta, which advertised that Poindexter & Little's Slave Depot was "for receiving, forwarding, and selling, for merchants, planters, and traders. Also, keeps constantly on hand a good assortment of Field Hands, Mechanics, and Servants." Many interstate slave-trading firms had a buy-side in the upper south and a sell-side in the lower south; the ad suggested that Little managed the buy side from Shelbyville, Tennessee. A biography of a survivor of American slavery, Allen Allensworth, described his experience at Poindexter & Little, where he was incarcerated in approximately 1855:

The next day, under a Negro driver, they were marched out of the slave mart here, double file to the steamboat landing at Memphis and placed on a packet for New Orleans. In due time they arrived and were driven like cattle to the Negro mart of Poindexter & Little, where there were over a thousand Negroes, each one waiting for a master. The rules and regulations of this mart were altogether different from those of Memphis. In this mart the Negroes were classified and seated on benches, as goods are arranged on shelves in a well regulated store. The cooks, mechanics, farm-hands, house-girls, seamstresses, wash-women, barbers, and boys each had his or her place. They were dressed in blue cloth clothing, tight-fitting jackets with flat brass buttons, and had the appearance of convicts. ¶ In this mart, or 'nigger' pen, as it was called, were confined over one thousand souls, it being one of the largest in New Orleans. These people were under strict rule and discipline. It was equipped with every known device and implement of torture. There was Uncle Billy with a gigantic physical frame, who looked as if he drank ox blood at every meal, whose business it was to give the cat-o'-nine-tails when a man or woman was assigned to the 'horse.' This 'horse' consisted of a four-legged litter: on it were rings and straps, used to secure the victim to it. Many times were men and women sent out to Uncle Billy to be punished, possibly in compliance with the instructions of their owners, who, when placing these folks, ordered that for so many days they were to be given from 10 to 50 lashes a day on their naked backs.

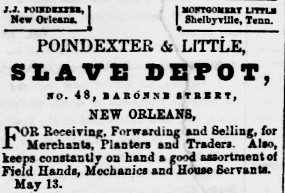
Poindexter & Little Slave Depot in 48 Baronne, New Orleans, Southern Confederacy, January 12, 1862

As told in the 1913 History of Tennessee and Tennesseans, "Benjamin Little, Chauncey Little, and Montgomery Little used to spend their winters in New Orleans, where they dealt extensively in cotton. At the breaking out of the Civil war the three brothers started home to enlist. The boiler of the boat on which they took passage burst, and Benjamin and Chauncey lost their lives." The mention of cotton trading but not slave trading in this narrative may be due to a wider cultural amnesia about slavery that was common in the south in the last quarter of the 19th and first quarter of the 20th centuries. According to Liverpool-based scholar Michael Tadman, "in the South generally much of the slave trade is missing from the historical record [but] slave trading and the forcible separation of slave families were pervasive...[and] traders tended to be men of considerable wealth and status."

Benjamin Little, Chauncey Little, and a third "negro trader" named Sim Eddins, were three of the 22 people killed in the explosion of the river steamboat Kentucky on around 4 a.m. May 19, 1861. The boat either tore a drum-head, or blew her mud-receiver, and thus her steam boilers exploded, shortly after pulling back from the dock at Columbia, Arkansas, near Helena. The gravely injured Little brothers (and Eddins) were debarked into a hay boat and taken to Greenville, Mississippi, for treatment, but the burn injuries from the scalding steam were fatal and they all died.

== Military career and death ==
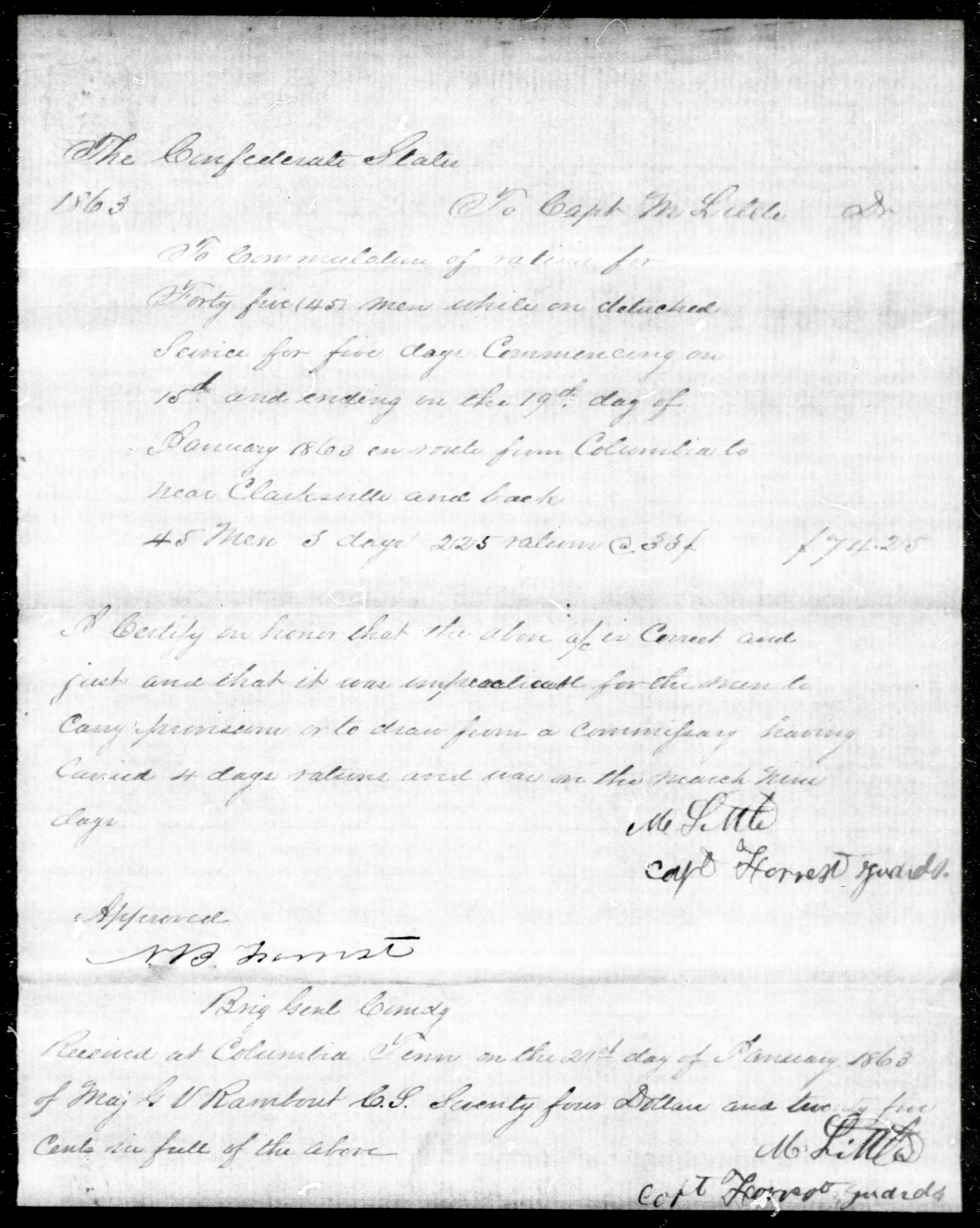
Approval of disbursement of rations to Capt. Little and his men while on detached service, January 1863, signed by N.B. Forrest

Little joined the Confederate States Army in 1862 and was appointed a captain in Captain Jackson's Company of Tennessee Cavalry (Confederate), also known as Gen. Forrest's Escort Company. A report from a 1905 veterans reunion described Little as "a warm personal friend of General Forrest before the war, and had been with him after the fall of Fort Donelson. Though often depleted, this company received many recruits, so that it numbered over one hundred men at the surrender at Gainesville, Ala., May 10, 1865." According to the company history, written in 2006, "Even before the Kentucky Campaign had cleared middle Tennessee of Yankees," Captain Little was sent to Bedford County to recruit a unit to serve with Forrest. Little used a plantation there, which belonged to relatives, as his base and "began recruiting men for the Escort under the very nose of the Federal garrison in Shelbyville." The Escort Company was "at first some 90 strong, it reported at Lavergne, and, composed of the best young men of Middle Tennessee, became General Forrest's personal escort thence forward." According to a handwritten history recorded by Lt. George Cowan (CSA) after the war, "The company was organized in the last days of September, 1862, and as they were mostly sons of the best citizens of Bedford and adjoining counties, and were able to mount and equip themselves, they went into the service the best armed and equipped body of men that ever entered the Confederate service. Each man had a fine horse rigged with a double-barrel shot-gun, and clothes enough for a regiment." According to history of irregular and guerrilla warfare during the American Civil War, "Well into 1862, Forrest was still recruiting men, some of whom had been in independent partisan ranger companies in western Tennessee. For example, Private James Hamner wrote that the unit he belonged to, 'Capt Little's Co of Partisan Rangers,' joined itself to Forrest in October 1862 without any direction or orders from the Confederate army."

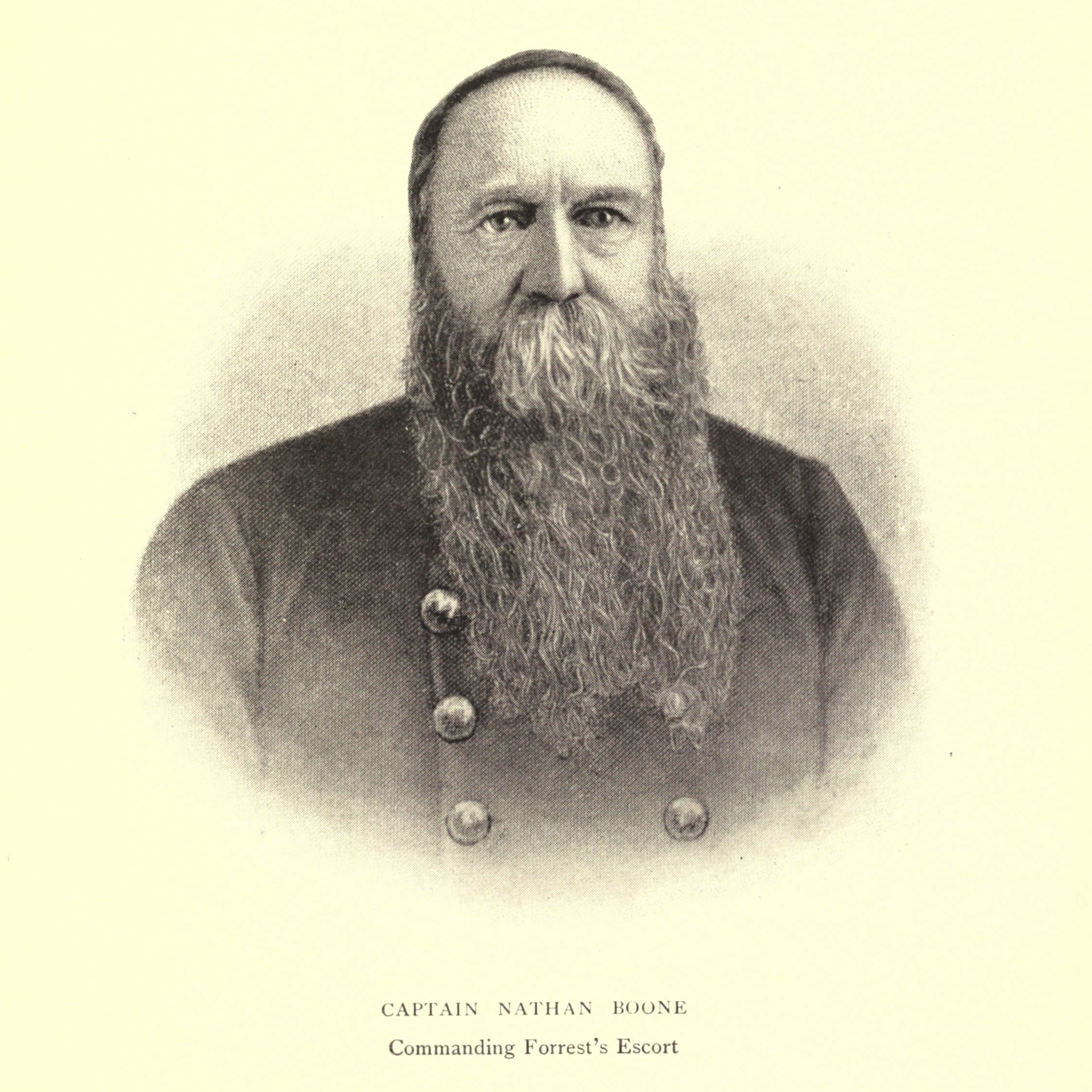
Post-war image of Little's cousin Nathan Boone, from John Allan Wyeth's 1899 biography of Nathan Bedford Forrest

Also in the company was Nathan Boone, a cousin on Little's mother's side; a nephew, Thomas C. Little, would later join as a private. Pvt. Little, son of Montgomery Little's older brother William Little, "came from a wealthy family in Bedford County, Tennessee, whose home was some two miles from Shelbyville on the Lewisburg Turnpike. Thomas had been too young to take part in the early days of the war, but when Forrest came into the area in September 1864 on his raid against the Nashville & Chattanooga Railroad, the youth ran away from home to join."

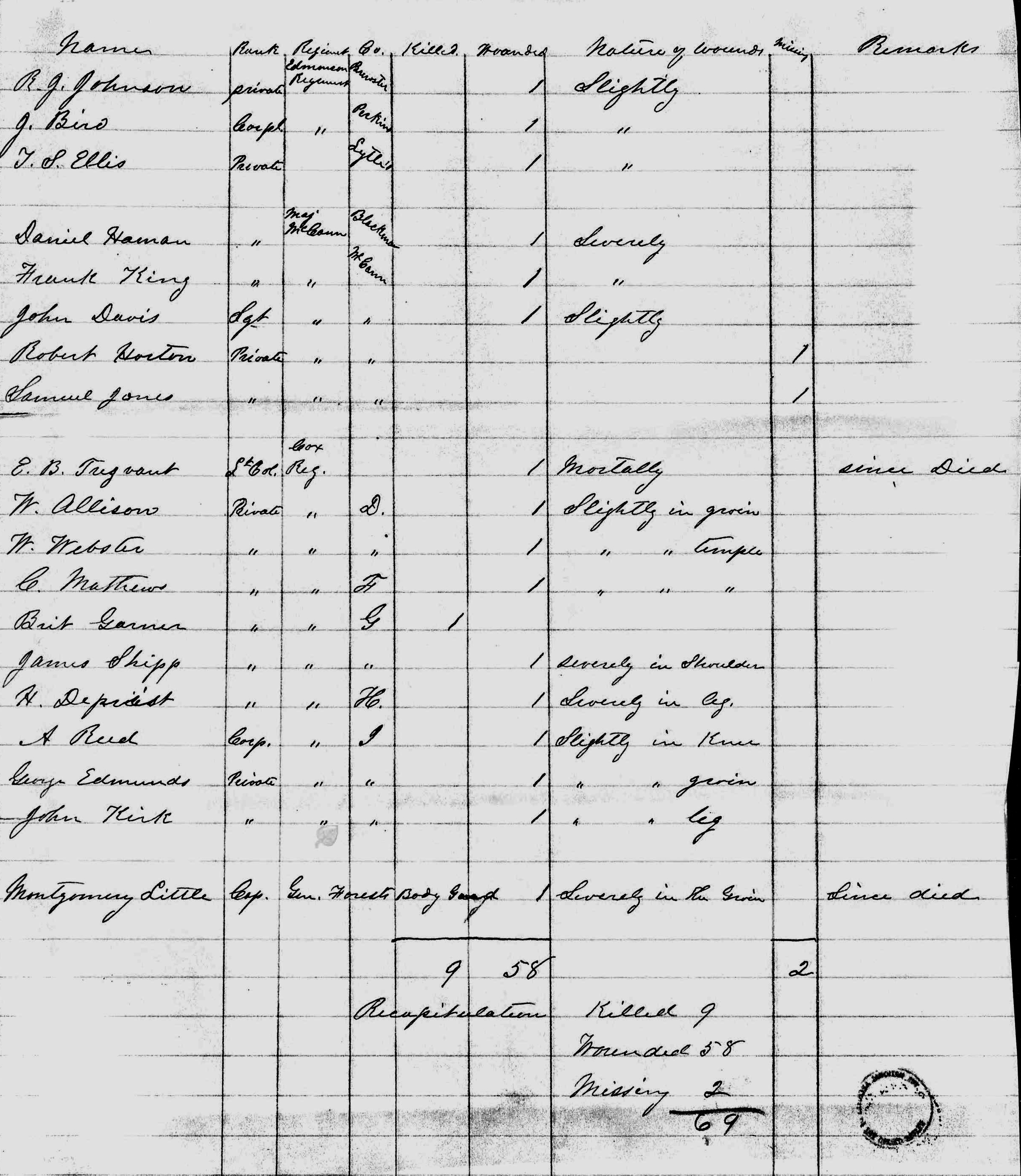
Confederate casualty list, Battle of Thompson's Station

Little was killed roughly five months after the organization of the company, in the Battle of Thompson's Station. According to the 1868 history, Little "fell by [Forrest's] side, mortally wounded" while the company fought uphill against Union infantry. According to Little's official personnel record he was "wounded severely in the groin, later died." Little was succeeded as captain by J. C. Jackson. The 1868 history, written during Forrest's lifetime, recorded, "Captain Little was an admirable officer, with superior martial aptitudes, including notable resolution and decision, which made him greatly trusted and his early death deeply regretted by his chief." His brother William Little was appointed executor of his estate. Montgomery Little and his brothers William, Benjamin, and Chauncey, are all buried at Willow Mount Cemetery in Shelbyville, Tennessee.

== See also ==
- List of Tennessee slave traders
- List of Tennessee Confederate Civil War units
- Jeffrey E. Forrest
