= Poindexter, Virginia =

Unincorporated community in Louisa County, Virginia

Poindexter
- Unincorporated community
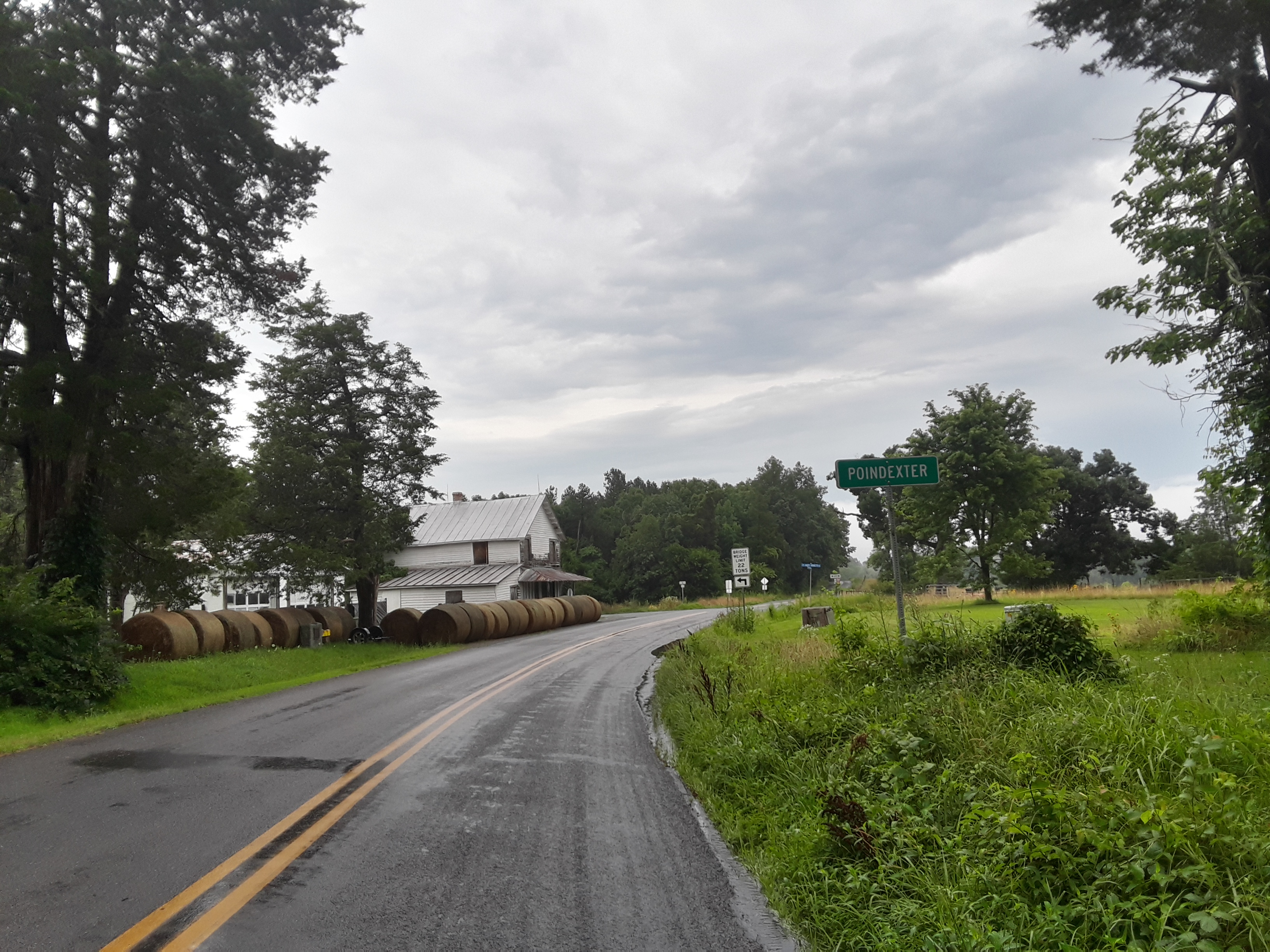
- Poindexter, July 2023

- Location within Virginia Location within the United States
- Coordinates: 38°00′5.51″N 78°8′40.78″W
- Country: United States
- State: Virginia
- County: Louisa
- Named for: Local postman
- Elevation: 397 ft (121 m)
- Time zone: UTC-5 (Eastern (EST))
  - Summer (DST): UTC-4 (EDT)
- ZIP code: 23093
- Area code: 540
- GNIS feature ID: 1477634

Poindexter is an unincorporated community in Louisa County, Virginia, United States. It is located at the four-way intersection of minor Virginia State Routes 613 (Poindexter Road) and 640 (Jack Jouett Road). State Route 717 (Central Branch Road) spurs off State Route 613 nearby.

A post office and store once operated in Poindexter. Citations suggest that the community is named for the postman who operated them around the 1850s.

== Geography ==
Poindexter is surrounded by farmland and private properties and small forested patches and lies at an elevation of 397 feet (121 m).

== Churches ==
Churches in the Poindexter area are:

- Foster Creek Baptist Church (built 1795 as Siloam Baptist Church)
- Berea Baptist Church (built 1857)
