= Byrd Hill =

American slave trader (1800–1872)

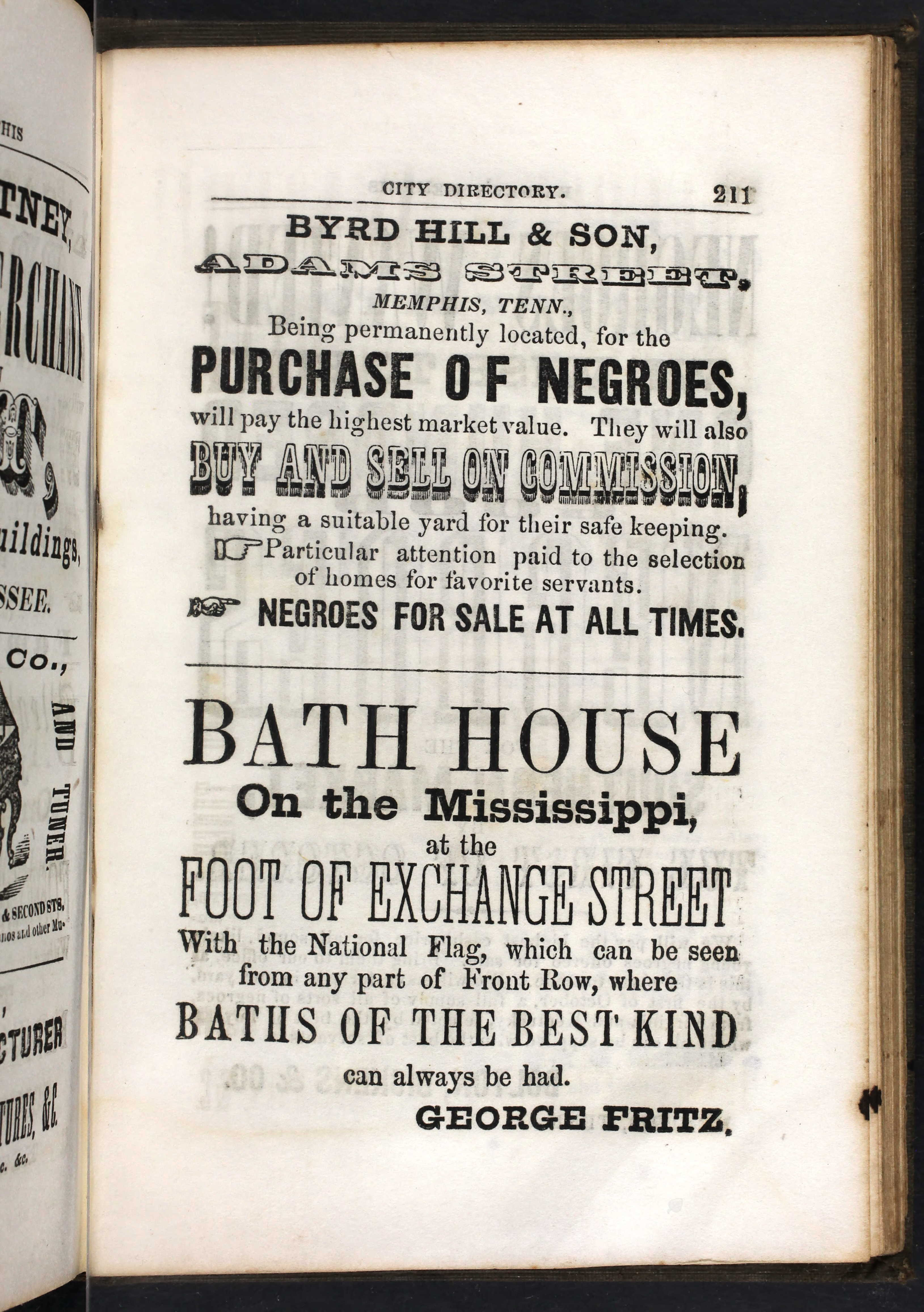
Slave trade in the Memphis, Tennessee, city directory, 1855

Byrd Hill (November 18, 1800 – September 28, 1872) was a slave trader of Tennessee and Mississippi prior to the American Civil War. Byrd Hill has been described as one of the "big four" slave traders in the centrally located city of Memphis on the Mississippi River. Hill was partners for a time with Nathan Bedford Forrest and is believed to have resold six of the Africans illegally trafficked to the United States on the Wanderer in 1859. Hill also made a fleeting appearance in Harriet Beecher Stowe's A Key to Uncle Tom's Cabin.

== Biography ==
Records of Byrd Hill's early life appear to be meager. He received a number of warrants for land in Tennessee in 1825, 1826, 1828, and 1842.

On June 15, 1830, he married Louisa A. Eddins. In 1830 he was a resident of Madison County, Tennessee, in a household with an unidentified white female in her 20s, and five black slaves (a male adult, a female adult, a boy under 10 years old, and two girls under 10 years old). In 1831 he may have recovered someone's lost horse, at which time he lived five miles south of Jackson, Tennessee, in Madison County. In 1840 he appears to have lived in the northern division of Marshall County, Mississippi in a household with a wife and five small children, and nine slaves. In 1841 he was in the southern division of the same county. Also in 1841, he was one of the organizers of a proposed railway line in Mississippi, the Holly Springs & State Line Rail Road. His wife Louisa A. Hill, who died May 15, year unknown, is buried at Hillcrest Cemetery in Holly Springs, Mississippi.

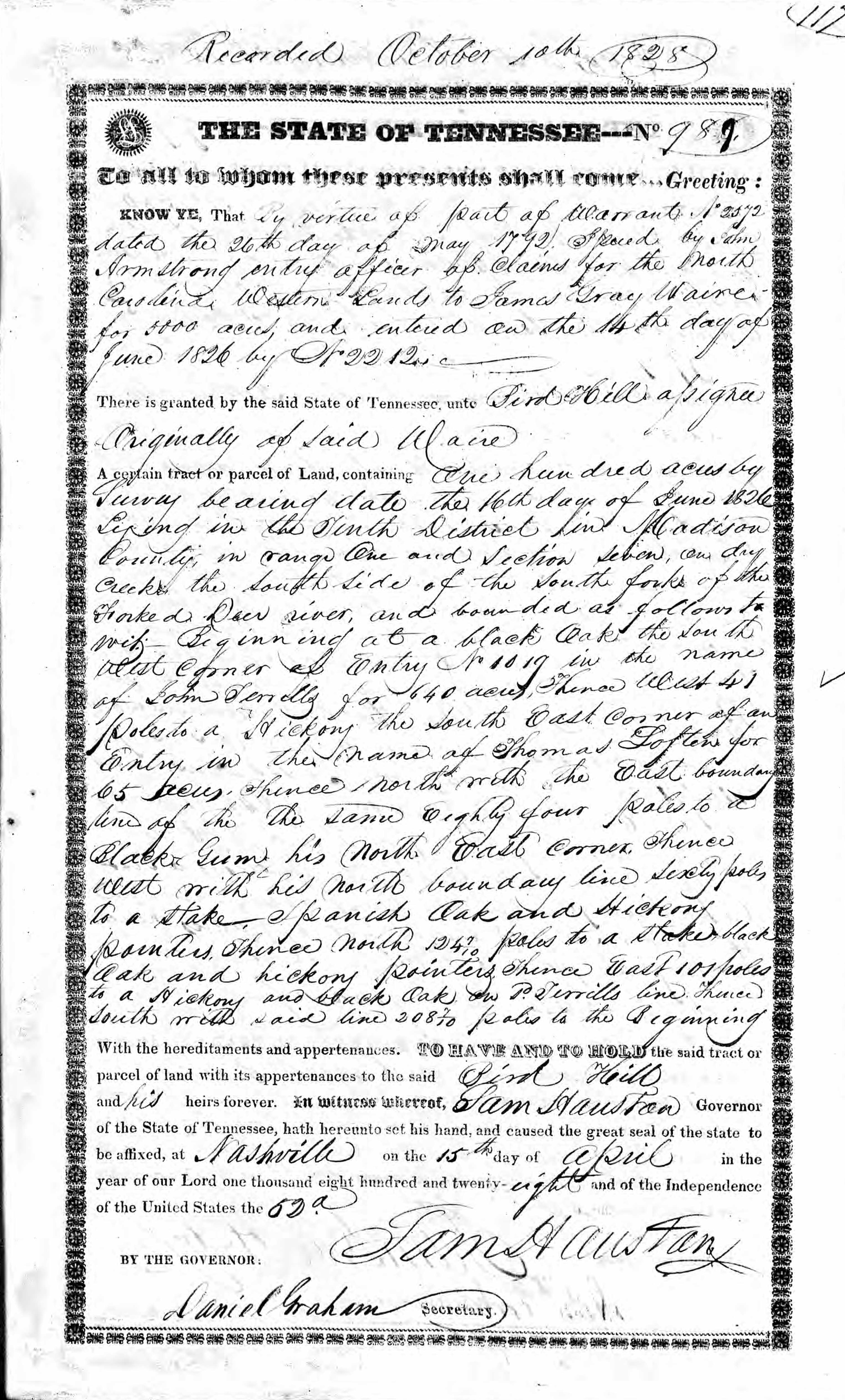
Land warrant in Madison County for Bird Hill, April 15, 1828, signed by Tennessee governor Sam Houston

In February 1849 he offered for sale 50 slaves recently arrived in Memphis from Virginia and Maryland. He was a pioneer then, of flouting Tennessee's ban on the interstate trade in slaves, which was state law from 1826 until 1855. In November 1849 he offered a US$25 (equivalent to $944.9 in 2024) reward for the recovery of an 18-year-old man named Andrew Jackson, who he thought would be traveling by riverboat to get to a free state, and who would ultimately seek out his legally free mother who lived in Louisville, Kentucky. Hill reported that this was the second time Andrew Jackson had escaped. In December 1849 Hill placed a newspaper advertisement listing a "Blacksmith and 30 or 40 Field Hands" for sale. At the time of the 1850 census, Hill identified his occupation as Negro trader. On Sunday, April 6, 1851, an unidentified negro child died in Memphis, Tennessee; a 20th-century typewritten index of the city's death records associated the child with Byrd Hill. In August 1851 he and a partner sought to hire 50 to 100 enslaved laborers to build the Memphis and Hernando plank road. On October 21, 1852, he married Lavinia R. Butler in Madison County, Tennessee. Born Lavinia Hardgrove, she was the widow of Burwell Butler. According to a 1993 history of Claybrook, Tennessee, "In a marriage indenture, dated the day before their marriage, Hill acknowledged Lavinia R. Butler's 'exclusive' possession of the 640-acre 'plantation whereon' she then resided; this also included her slaves and carriage and personalty." In 1853 Harriet Beecher Stowe published A Key to Uncle Tom's Cabin, which reprinted an ad for slaves that mentioned that Benjamin Little was now operating his slave auction business at "Byrd Hill's old stand" on Adams Street.

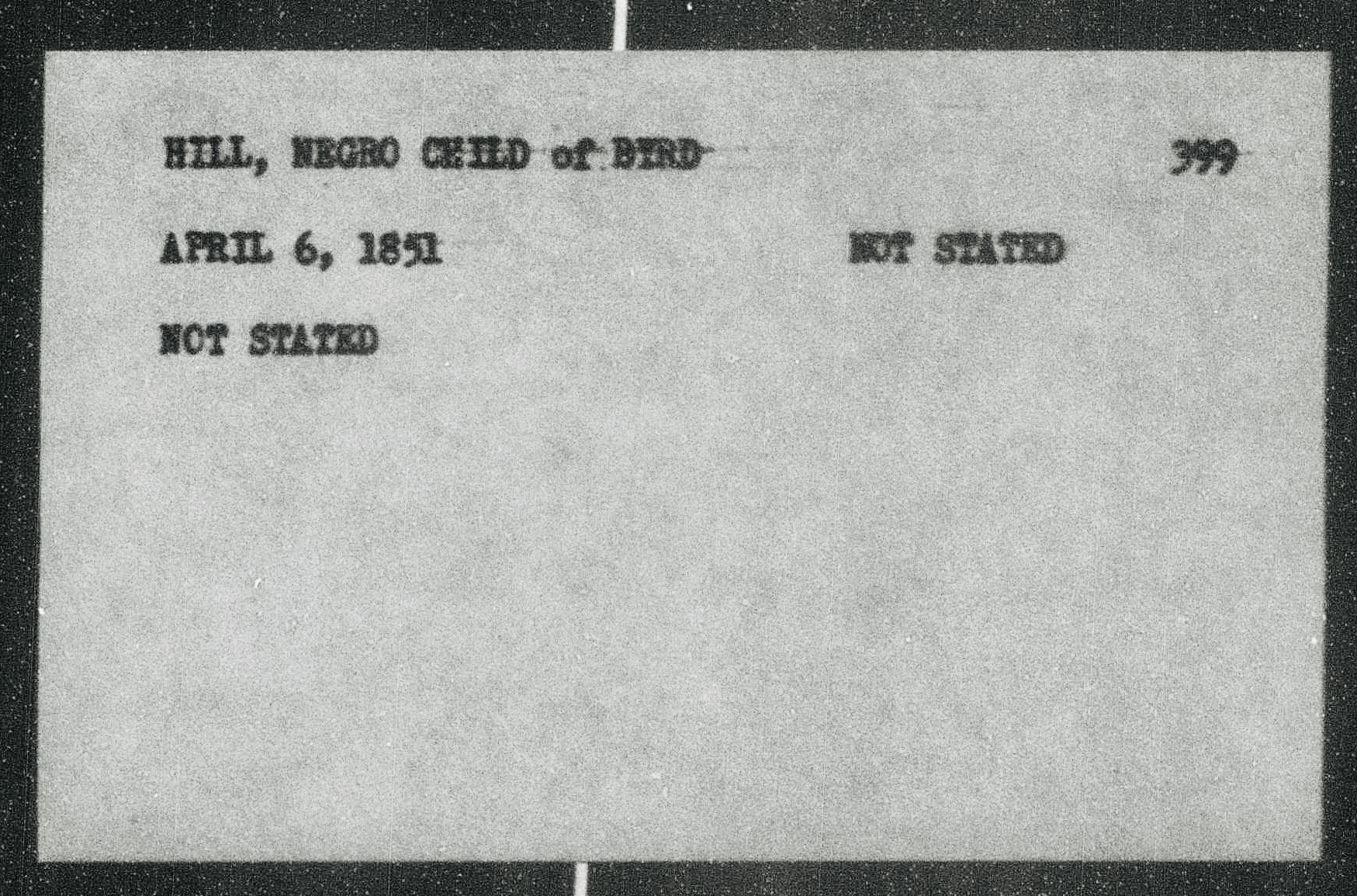
On Sunday, April 6, 1851, an unidentified negro child died in Memphis, Tennessee; a 20th-century typewritten index of the city's death records associated the child with Byrd Hill

In 1853, he formed a business partnership with Nathan Bedford Forrest, called Hill & Forrest. According to historian Timothy S. Huebner, "In at least one instance, Hill and Forrest bought and then sold a free Black couple, an action that, had it been discovered at the time, might have led to legal trouble. With a mart on Adams Street, Hill & Forrest also 'sold on commission,' meaning that the firm would serve as a broker, selling others' slaves for a percentage of the sale. Forrest apparently remained in this partnership with Hill through April 1854."

On the 28th day of one of the first months of 1859, some 50 years after commerce in saltwater slaves shipped across the Atlantic Ocean from Africa had been prohibited, Hill auctioned six people who had been most likely been trafficked to the United States from the Kingdom of Kongo on the slave ship Wanderer. Hill printed a handbill listing his goods, and a copy came into the hands of someone who then anonymously mailed it to the New-York Tribune.

AT AUCTION

SOMETHING NEW
SIX LIKELY
KONGO AFRICANS

JACOB, 22 years old
SOL, 19 years old
JIM, 18 years old
JESSE, 16 years old
SAM, 16 years old
MOSES, 10 years old

These Africans, with eight or ten natives, will be sold, regardless of price or weather,
THIS DAY, 11 o'clock
GREAT BARGAINS are expected. Come one, come all. Sale at my mart.
BYRD HILL
Thursday, 28th, 1859

On July 7, 1859, Byrd Hill bought the slave yard of Nathan Bedford Forrest for US$30,000 (equivalent to $1,049,889 in 2024). In September 1859, Hill was pickpocketed of US$1,500 (equivalent to $52,494 in 2024) on the platform of the railway depot at Charleston, South Carolina. The culprit, who gave his name as Goodrich, was apprehended.

Sometime between 1861 and 1863, Hill's wife and the wife of Josiah Deloach donated seven gallons of buttermilk, a sack of potatoes, and a lamb to the Confederate military hospital at the former Overton Hotel in Memphis. Hill was listed as a resident of Adams Street in Memphis in the 1865 Memphis city directory. In April 1867 someone stole a mule from the stable of Col. Byrd Hill. In November 1867 he lived three miles south of Memphis, on the old State Line road, and had a valuable horse stolen from his property; he offered a reward of US$100 (equivalent to $2,250 in 2024) for its return. In June 1868 he was deemed First Vice President of the newly organized White's Station Agricultural and Stock Association, which met at White's Station along the Memphis and Charleston Railroad. Byrd Hill's second wife Lavinia R. Hill died of heart disease in October 1868 at the age of 60; she was buried in Memphis.

Byrd Hill died in Shelby County, Tennessee in 1872. A death notice that appeared in the Memphis Avalanche stated that he was a man "known to thousands of former residents of this city...Before the war he was a dealer in slaves, in the building now known as the Central House." Byrd Hill was buried at Hill Cemetery in Madison County, Tennessee.

== See also ==
- List of American slave traders
- History of Memphis, Tennessee
- West Tennessee
- Tennessee in the American Civil War
- Simeon G. Eddins – American slave trader (~1823–1861)
