= CSS Countess =

History

Confederate States
- Name: Countess
- Namesake: Countess
- Launched: July 1860
- Completed: August 17, 1860

General characteristics
- Type: Sidewheel steamer
- Tonnage: 198
- Length: 150 ft (46 m)
- Beam: 30 ft (9.1 m)
- Depth of hold: 4 ft 9 in (1.45 m)
- Propulsion: Steam engine, side-wheels

Countess was a sidewheel steamer built in 1860 in Cincinnati, Ohio, and served the Confederates in the Mississippi River area.

Built in Cincinnati in 1860, Countess had a hull length of 150 ft, beam of 30 ft, and hold depth of 4.8 ft. Her machinery consisted of two five-flue boilers, with a pair of cylinders working the two water wheels. Launched in July and completed by August 17, 1860 at a cost of $25,000, she was built under the supervision of her owner, Captain William C. Harrison of New Orleans, the owner of several other steamers. The Countess was built for the Red River packet trade and had a capacity of 1,600 cotton bales. Captained by George T. Wilson, she departed Cincinnati for New Orleans on the next day, arriving there on August 30 with a miscellaneous cargo. She operated as a packet ship on the Mississippi River and the Red River on a regular route from New Orleans to Shreveport, carrying cotton, passengers and mail.

During the American Civil War, Countess was employed by the Confederacy as an unarmed transport, likely under contract. The steamer was retained by Major General John G. Walker for the evacuation of Alexandria, Louisiana in March 1864 during the Red River campaign. She loaded slaves, tools, and property from the city on March 13 and escaped upriver with the other Confederate steamers, reaching Grand Ecore by March 17. She was incorrectly reported to have been burned by Confederate forces after grounding in the Alexandria rapids during the evacuation of the city, and continued to operate late into the war. This report arose from the misidentification of the burned Alexandria-Pineville ferry as Countess on March 15 by Union Lieutenant Commander Seth Ledyard Phelps in his post-battle report. She was employed as a flag of truce vessel in January 1865 and transported troops across the Red River at Shreveport in April of that year. After the Confederate surrender, Countess continued to operate as a packet carrying cotton on the Red River.

In 1863, a new Countess was built in Cincinnati to similar specifications. Taken over by the Union, she served as the USS Elk until the end of the war and reverted to her original name when returned to civilian service in September 1865.

== Sources ==
- King, William Henry (2006). Joiner, Gary D.; Joiner, Marilyn S.; Cardin, Clifton D. (eds.). No Pardons to Ask, Nor Apologies to Make: The Journal of William Henry King, Gray's 28th Louisiana Infantry Regiment. Knoxville: University of Tennessee Press. ISBN 9781572334618.
- Mayeux, Steven M. (2007). Earthen Walls, Iron Men: Fort DeRussy, Louisiana, and the Defense of Red River. Knoxville: University of Tennessee Press. ISBN 9781572335769.
- Way, Frederick (1983). Way's Packet directory, 1848–1983. Athens: Ohio University Press. ISBN 0-8214-0694-9.
