= Kentucky (steamboat) =

Accident-prone American riverboat

The Kentucky was a 19th-century sidewheel steamboat of the Ohio River, Mississippi River, and Red River of the South in the United States. Kentucky was involved in not one, not two, but three serious accidents over her lifespan (1856–1865), which resulted in the deaths of one, 20+, and 50+ people, respectively. She was built in Cincinnati, and her length was 222 ft (68 m) with a capacity of 375 short tons (340,000 kg).

== Drumhead failure (1860 or early 1861?) ==
Sometime prior to the multi-fatality explosion near Helena, Arkansas in 1861, "She blew out a drumhead some little time since, by which accident one life was lost. The necessary repairs were made under the personal supervision of Inspector McCord, who pronounced it more safe than ever."

== Drumhead–boiler explosion (May 1861) ==
Kentucky, a New Orleans to Vicksburg packet steamboat of the Confederate-occupied Mississippi River, exploded around 4 a.m. on May 19, 1861, killing at least 22 people and injuring five more, with likely additional unidentified dead and wounded. The boat either tore a drum-head, or blew her mud-receiver, and thus her steam boilers exploded, shortly after pulling back from the dock at Columbia, Arkansas, near Helena. (Columbia was an important steamboat landing site of its day but ceased to exist sometime in the 1870s.) Among the dead were three slave traders, two of whom were brothers traveling back to their home state of Tennessee to enlist in the Confederate Army. A third brother, Montgomery Little, survived the explosion but was killed fighting with Nathan Bedford Forrest in 1863.

At the time of this incident, it was said that Kentucky had been built in 1857 or 1858 and was said to be worth US$20,000 (equivalent to $716,667 in 2025). She had previously been a Louisville to Memphis packet.

== Snag and sinking (June 1865) ==
Kentucky hit a sunken log near Eagle Bend on the Red River between Shreveport and New Orleans around 9 p.m. on the night of June 9, 1865. (As the Mississippi ebbed and flowed, and as riverside soil was eroded due to 19th-century agricultural practices, trees along the banks would eventually topple into the river and form underwater snags, also known as sawyers).

The heavily overloaded ship quickly sank and scores of people were killed. One report said that 50 bodies were recovered and buried, and that more than 20 others were swept away never to be seen again. Another account as many as 288 people may have been killed. Many of the victims were recently paroled Confederates heading home to Missouri; with them came family members and at least 150 paroled cavalry horses. Seven "unidentified negroes" were among the bodies recovered and buried.

== Shipwreck ==
The wreck of Kentucky was rediscovered in 1994 and excavated by archaeologists as site number 16B0358.
