= Robert Poindexter (politician) =

Louisiana reconstruction era American politician

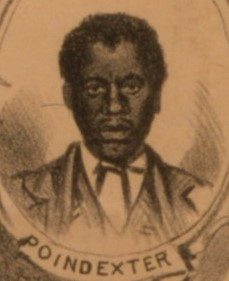

Louisiana State Senate
- In office 1868–1870

Louisiana House of Representatives
- In office 1874 – April 1875

Personal details
- Party: Republican (until 1876); Democrat (from 1876)

Robert Poindexter was a state legislator who served in the Louisiana House of Representatives and Louisiana State Senate during the Reconstruction era.

== Biography ==
Birth records disagree on his birthplace as being either New York state or Tennessee and he may have been enslaved until 1860. The 1870 census listed him as a New York native aged 38, but 1869 bank records list him as 47 and from Sullivan County, Tennessee. The bank records also list his service in the Union Army during the American Civil War in Company F of the 78th Regiment Infantry U.S. Colored Troops.

He was a member of the 1868 Louisiana constitutional convention representing Assumption Parish, Louisiana. He also a member of the 1867 Louisiana constitutional convention and a signature to the document produced.

Poindexter was elected to the Louisiana State Senate in June 1868 as a Republican representing Assumption, Lafourche and St. Landry Parish's. He served from 1868 until 1870 and then later was elected to serve in the Louisiana House of Representatives in 1874 but only served until 1875 due to the Wheeler Compromise.

In 1875 when being removed from office he stated that one of those replacing him was his former owner E. F. Dugas who he said never ill treated his slaves.

While serving in his first legislative session he lived in New Orleans and shared a house with four fellow legislators (two black and two white), but he kept his official residence as Napoleonville, Louisiana.

In 1875 Governor William Pitt Kellogg appointed Poindexter to the position of supervisor of registration for Assumption Parish.

He was a Republican until 1876 when he changed allegiances to the Democratic Party partly due to the Republicans failure on schools and teachers pay, but also because he disliked Wheeler for the loss of his seat.

While serving in the senate Poindexter introduced a number of bills relating to moral and family values such as the suppression of obscene publications and the outlawing of adultery and concubinage. He also introduced a bill on August 13, 1868 to provided children with free school transport which was adopted August 20, 1868.

The 1870 United States census lists him as running a ferry company, owing $500 of real estate and $5,000 in personal property.

== See also ==
- African American officeholders from the end of the Civil War until before 1900
