= List of Alabama slave traders =

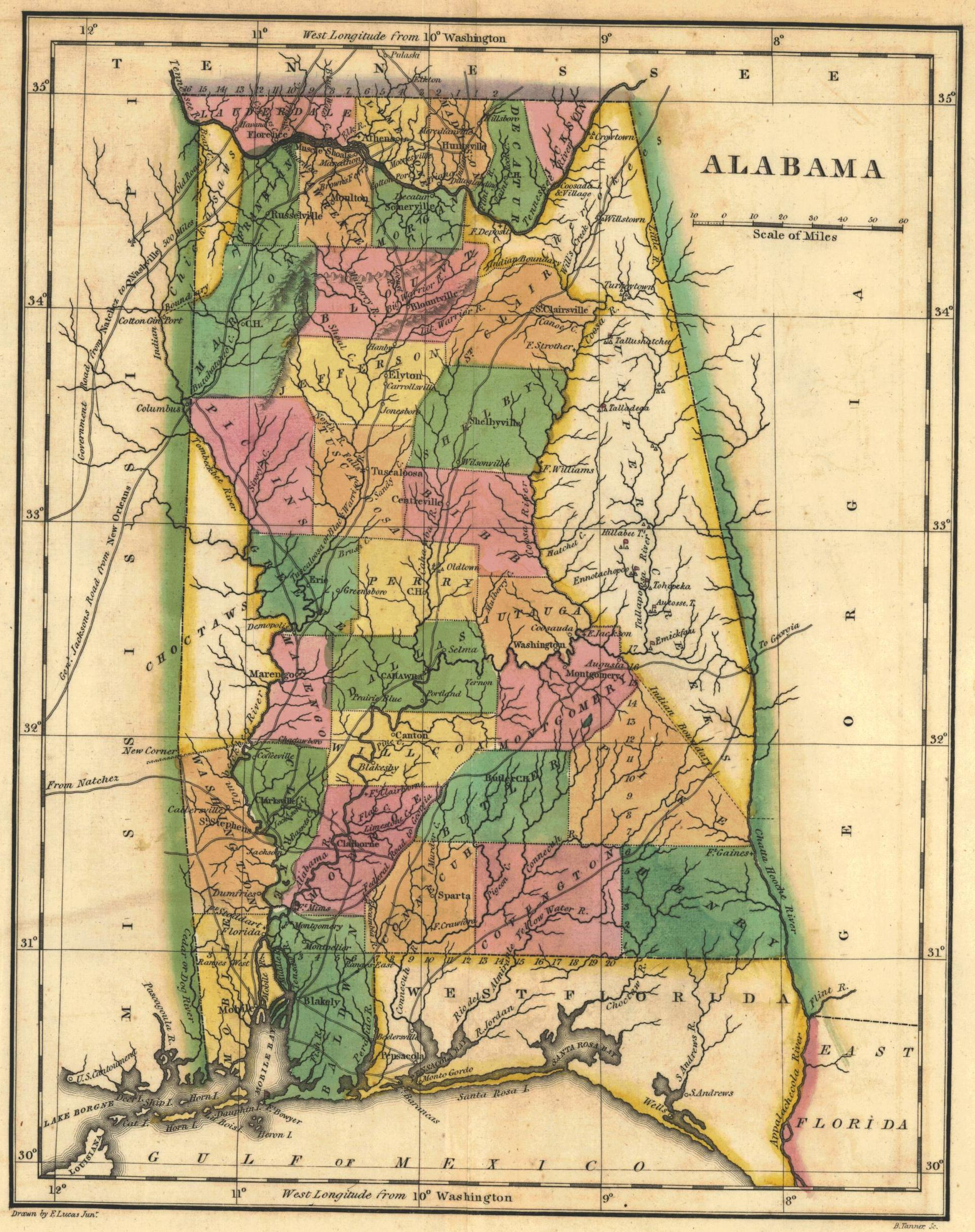
Map of Alabama in 1822

This is a list of slave traders working in Alabama from settlement until 1865:

- Anderson, Alabama
- D. S. Arnold, Montgomery
- Britton Atkins, Blountsville and Montgomery, Ala.
- David Avery, Alabama
- Barnard & Howard, Montgomery, Ala.
- Bates, Virginia and Mobile, Ala.
- F. H. Bock, Montgomery
- Robert Booth, Richmond and Alabama
- Brown & Bulger, Montgomery
- Samuel R. Browning, Montgomery
- Cameron & Benson, Montgomery
- David Cobb, Huntsville, Lexington, Ky. and Mississippi
- James Cooper, Montgomery, Ala.
- William Cooper, Alabama
- Samuel J. Dawson, Natchez, Washington, D.C. and Alabama
- Green Dennis, Mobile, Alabama
- Deupree & Williams, Greensboro, Ala.
- John Ferman, Alabama
- John Foster, Alabama
- Benjamin Gaines, Alabama
- Gilmer & Co., Montgomery
- T. Glen, Huntsville, Ala.
- John Goodin, Randolph County, Ala.
- John Gordon, Alabama
- W. A. Grant, Montgomery
- Gray James & Co.
- Frederick A. Hall, Mobile, Ala.
- Hansford, Brame & Co., Montgomery
- Harris, Alabama
- Mason Harwell, Montgomery, Ala.
- Julius Hich, Alabama
- Buck Hicks, Goochland Co., Va. and Alabama
- Hill & Hartwell, Montgomery, Ala.
- Waddy I. Jackson, Alabama
- Isaac Jarratt, Huntsville, Ala.
- Fred. Jones & Co., Huntsville
- Lavon & Foster, Montgomery, Ala.
- Lee & Norton, Montgomery
- W. G. Lee & N. M. Carter, Montgomery
- John W. Lindsey, Montgomery, Ala.
- Manor, Alabama
- Mason & Howard, Montgomery, Ala.
- John McCleskey, Mobile, Ala.
- John McKane, North Carolina and Alabama
- D. McKay, North Carolina and Alabama
- J. M. McKee, Girard, Ala.
- James Moore, Virginia and Alabama
- John H. Murphy & Co., Montgomery
- Leonard Pitkin, Montgomery
- Powell & Co., Montgomery, Ala.
- Thomas A. Powell, Louisville, Ky. and Montgomery, Ala. and St. Louis, and New Orleans
- Ragland, Mobile, Ala.
- Joel Rimes, Maryland and Alabama
- William H. Robertson, Mobile, Ala.Is
- A. J. Rux, Alabama
- Sharp, Montgomery, Ala.
- Belthazer Tardy, Mobile, Ala.
- Watley, near Auburn
- Weatherly and Donald, Alabama
- Anderson West, Marion County, Ala.
- Wetherby, Prairie Bluff, Ala.
- Williamson & Puryear, Montgomery, Ala.
- Jack Willison, Maryland and Alabama
- Wilkinson & Nickels, Montgomery
- John Woodden, Virginia and Alabama
- James Worth, Alabama

== See also ==
- History of slavery in Alabama
- List of slave traders of the United States
- List of District of Columbia slave traders
- List of Georgia and Florida slave traders
- List of Kentucky slave traders
- List of Maryland and Delaware slave traders
- List of Missouri slave traders
- Family separation in American slavery
- List of largest slave sales in the United States
- Movement to reopen the transatlantic slave trade
- Kidnapping into slavery in the United States
- Bibliography of the slave trade in the United States
- Slave markets and slave jails in the United States

== Sources ==
- Bancroft, Frederic (2023) [1931]. Slave Trading in the Old South. Southern Classics Series. Introduction by Michael Tadman. University of South Carolina Press. ISBN 978-1-64336-427-8.
- Colby, Robert K. D. (2024). An Unholy Traffic: Slave Trading in the Civil War South. Oxford University Press. doi:10.1093/oso/9780197578261.001.0001. ISBN 9780197578285. LCCN 2023053721. OCLC 1412042395.
- Equal Justice Initiative (2018). "Montgomery Slave Trade". Slavery in America (Report). Equal Justice Initiative. pp. 31–49.
- Friedman, Saul (2017). Jews and the American Slave Trade. Routledge. ISBN 9781351510769.
- Stowe, Harriet Beecher (1853). A key to Uncle Tom's cabin: presenting the original facts and documents upon which the story is founded. Boston: J. P. Jewett & Co. LCCN 02004230. OCLC 317690900. OL 21879838M.
- Sellers, James Benson (2015) [1950]. "Chapter 5: Traffic in Slaves". Slavery in Alabama. Library of Alabama Classics. Introduction by Harriet E. Amos Doss. Tuscaloosa: University of Alabama Press. ISBN 9780817389147. LCCN 50004433. OCLC 899157440.
