= Bibliography of the slave trade in the United States =

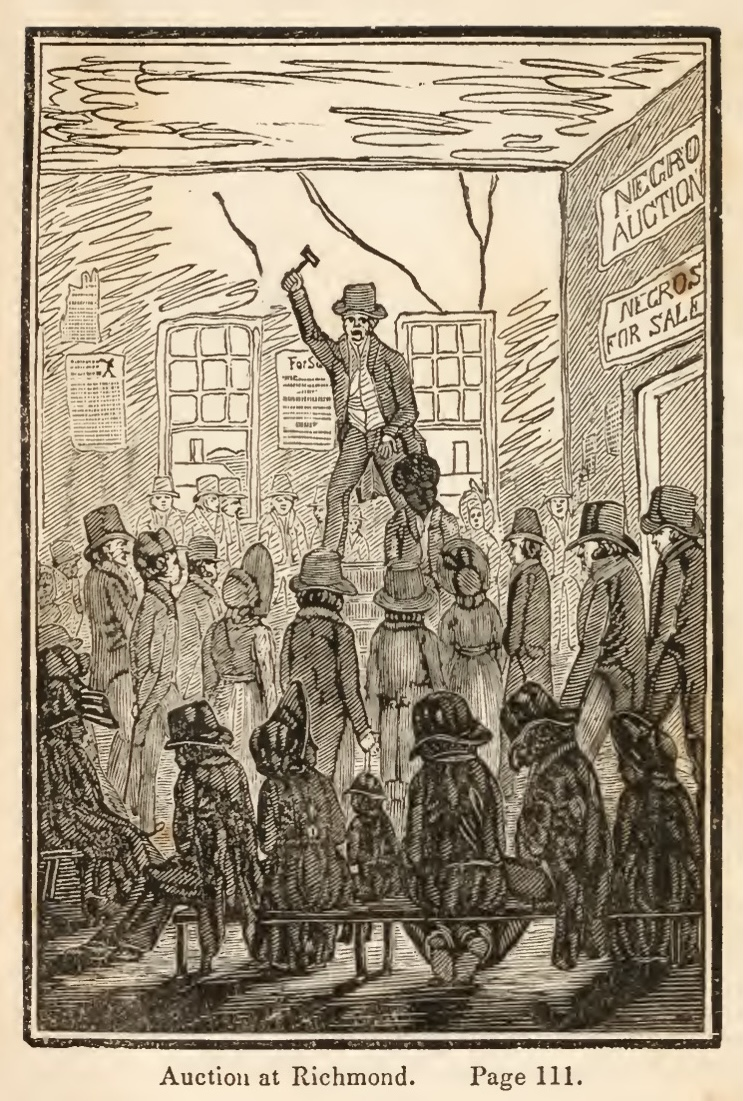
"Auction at Richmond" (Picture of Slavery in the United States of America by Rev. George Bourne, published by Edwin Hunt in Middletown, Conn., 1834)

This is a bibliography of works regarding the internal or domestic slave trade in the United States (1776–1865, with a measurable increase in activity after 1808, following the Act Prohibiting Importation of Slaves).

== General ==
- Bancroft, Frederic (2023) [1931, 1996]. Slave Trading in the Old South (Original publisher: J. H. Fürst Co., Baltimore). Southern Classics Series. Introduction by Michael Tadman (Reprint ed.). Columbia, S.C.: University of South Carolina Press. ISBN 978-1-64336-427-8. LCCN 95020493. OCLC 1153619151.
- Baptist, Edward E. (2014). The Half Has Never Been Told: Slavery and the Making of American Capitalism. New York: Basic Books. ISBN 978-0-465-00296-2. LCCN 2017302300. OCLC 885121937.
- Berry, Daina Ramey (2017). The Price for Their Pound of Flesh: The Value of the Enslaved, from Womb to Grave, in the Building of a Nation. Boston: Beacon Press. ISBN 9780807047637. LCCN 2016014894. OCLC 970030444. OL 26888279M.
- Cabot, Andy (December 31, 2020). "'Why may not our country be enriched by that lucrative traffic?': The slave trade and the failed politics of federal proscription in the early American Republic (1787–1808)". Xvii–xviii. 77 (77). doi:10.4000/1718.6037. ISSN 0291-3798. S2CID 234415270.
- Calomiris, Charles W. and Pritchett, Jonathan B., Preserving Slave Families for Profit: Traders' Incentives and Pricing in the New Orleans Slave Market (August 2008). NBER Working Paper No. w14281, Available SSRN 1261468
- Chatman, Carliss (2023). "Teaching Slavery in Commercial Law". Michigan Journal of Race & Law (28.1): 1. doi:10.36643/mjrl.28.1.teaching. ISSN 2688-5492.
- Cheathem, Mark Renfred (2007). "The Domestic Slave Trade and the United States Constitution". Reviews in American History. 35 (3): 374–379. doi:10.1353/rah.2007.0048. ISSN 1080-6628. S2CID 143736923.
- Colby, Robert K. D. (2024). An Unholy Traffic: Slave Trading in the Civil War South. Oxford University Press. ISBN 978-0-19-757826-1.
- Conrad, Robert Edgar (2001). In the Hands of Strangers: Readings on Foreign and Domestic Slave Trading and the Crisis of the Union. Penn State University Press. ISBN 978-0-271-02343-4.
- Dew, Charles B. (2016). The making of a racist: a southerner reflects on family, history, and the slave trade. Charlottesville: University of Virginia Press. ISBN 9780813938882. LCCN 2015043815. OCLC 956713856.
- Deyle, Steven (Spring 1992). "The Irony of Liberty: Origins of the Domestic Slave Trade". Journal of the Early Republic. 12 (1): 37–62. doi:10.2307/3123975. JSTOR 3123975.
- Deyle, Steven H. (2005). Carry Me Back: The Domestic Slave Trade in American Life. New York: Oxford University Press. ISBN 978-0195160406. LCCN 2004056840. OCLC 61342034. OL 7390529M.
- Deyle, Steven (2009). "An 'Abominable' New Trade: The Closing of the African Slave Trade and the Changing Patterns of U.S. Political Power, 1808–60". The William and Mary Quarterly. Abolishing the Slave Trades: Ironies and Reverberations. 66 (4). Omohundro Institute of Early American History and Culture: 833–850. ISSN 0043-5597. JSTOR 40467543.
- Deyle, Steven (2010). "5. Rethinking the Slave Trade: Slave Traders and the Market Revolution in the South". In Barnes, L. Diane; Schoen, Brian; Towers, Frank (eds.). The Old South's modern worlds : slavery, region, and nation in the age of progress. Oxford University Press. ISBN 9780199840960. OCLC 721907202.
- Finkelman, Paul, ed. (June 18, 2019) [1990]. The Slave Trade & Migration. Articles on American Slavery. Routledge. doi:10.4324/9781315057613. ISBN 9781315057613.
- Finley, Alexandra J. (2020). An Intimate Economy: Enslaved Women, Work, and America's Domestic Slave Trade. Chapel Hill: University of North Carolina Press. ISBN 9781469655123. JSTOR 10.5149/9781469655130_finley. LCCN 2019052078. OCLC 1194871275. Project MUSE book 76798.
- Freudenberger, Herman; Pritchett, Jonathan B. (Winter 1991). "The Domestic United States Slave Trade: New Evidence". Journal of Interdisciplinary History. 21 (3): 447. doi:10.2307/204955. JSTOR 204955.
- Gudmestad, Robert H. (2003). A Troublesome Commerce: The Transformation of the Interstate Slave Trade. Baton Rouge: Louisiana State University Press. ISBN 9780807129227.
  - (Thesis version via core.ac.uk)
  - Gudmestad, Robert Harold, "A Troublesome Commerce: The Interstate Slave Trade, 1808–1840." (1999). LSU Historical Dissertations and Theses. 6941. https://repository.lsu.edu/gradschool_disstheses/6941 ISBN 9780599372498 doi:10.31390/gradschool_disstheses.6941
- Gutman, H. G.; Sutch, R. (1976). "The Slave Family: Protected Agent of Capitalist Masters or Victim of the Slave Trade?". In David, Paul A. (ed.). Reckoning with Slavery: A Critical Study in the Quantitative History of American Negro Slavery. New York: Oxford University Press. pp. 214–255. ISBN 9780195020335. OCLC 2301195.
- Hilliard, Kathleen M. (2013). Masters, Slaves, and Exchange: Power's Purchase in the Old South. Cambridge Studies on the American South. Cambridge University Press. ISBN 978-1107636644.
- Johnson, Walter, ed. (2005). The Chattel Principle: Internal Slave Trades in the Americas. The David Brion Davis Series. Yale University Press. ISBN 9780300103557.
- Johnson, Walter (2009) [1999]. Soul by Soul: Life Inside the Antebellum Slave Market. Cambridge: Harvard University Press. doi:10.4159/9780674039155. ISBN 9780674039155. LCCN 99-046696. OCLC 923120203.
- Johnson, Walter (2013). River of Dark Dreams: Slavery and Empire in the Cotton Kingdom. Cambridge: Belknap Press of Harvard University Press. ISBN 9780674074880. LCCN 2012030065. OCLC 827947225. OL 26179618M.
- Kotlikoff, Laurence J.; Pinera, Sebastian (June 1977). "The Old South's Stake in the Inter-Regional Movement of Slaves, 1850–1860". The Journal of Economic History. 37 (2): 434–450. doi:10.1017/S002205070009700X. ISSN 0022-0507. S2CID 153416059.
- Kotlikoff, Laurence J. (October 1979). "The Structure of Slave Prices in New Orleans, 1804–1862" (PDF). Economic Inquiry. 17 (4): 496–518. doi:10.1111/j.1465-7295.1979.tb00544.x. ISSN 1465-7295. Archived from the original (PDF) on 2023-11-13.
- Lightner, David L. (Spring 2002). "The Founders and the Interstate Slave Trade". Journal of the Early Republic. 22 (1): 25–51. doi:10.2307/3124856. JSTOR 3124856.
- Lightner, David L. (November 2004). "The Supreme Court and the Interstate Slave Trade: A Study in Evasion, Anarchy, and Extremism". Journal of Supreme Court History. 29 (3): 229–253. doi:10.1111/j.1059-4329.2004.00084.x. ISSN 1059-4329. S2CID 143223298.
- Lightner, David L. (2006). Slavery and the Commerce Power: How the Struggle against the Interstate Slave Trade Led to the Civil War. New Haven, CT: Yale University Press. doi:10.12987/9780300135169. ISBN 0-300-11470-2. OCLC 1024037256. S2CID 262482327.
- McDaniel, W. Caleb (2019). Sweet Taste of Liberty: A True Story of Slavery and Restitution in America. New York: Oxford University Press. ISBN 978-0-19-084699-2. LCCN 2018047090. OCLC 1078955238.
- McInnis, Maurie D. (2013). Slaves Waiting for Sale: Abolitionist Art and the American Slave Trade. University of Chicago Press. ISBN 978-0226055060.
- Miller, William L. "A Note on the Importance of the Interstate Slave Trade of the Ante Bellum South" Journal of Political Economy 1965 73:2, 181–187
- Pritchett, Jonathan B. (Summer 1997). "The Interregional Slave Trade and the Selection of Slaves for the New Orleans Market". Journal of Interdisciplinary History. 28 (1). The MIT Press: 57–85. doi:10.2307/206166. ISSN 0022-1953. JSTOR 206166.
- Pritchett, Jonathan B. (June 2001). "Quantitative Estimates of the United States Interregional Slave Trade, 1820–1860". The Journal of Economic History. 61 (2): 467–475. doi:10.1017/S002205070102808X. S2CID 154462144.
- Thomas D. Russell, Articles Sell Best Singly: The Disruption of Slave Families at Court Sales, 1996 Utah L. Rev. 1161 (1996) https://digitalcommons.du.edu/cgi/viewcontent.cgi?article=1166&context=law_facpub
- Schermerhorn, Calvin (2014). "Capitalism's Captives: The Maritime United States Slave Trade, 1807–1850". Journal of Social History. 47 (4): 897–921. doi:10.1093/jsh/shu029. JSTOR 43308821.
- Schermerhorn, Calvin (2016). "10. The Coastwise Slave Trade and a Mercantile Community of Interest". In Rockman, Seth Edward; Beckert, Sven (eds.). Slavery's Capitalism: A New History of American Economic Development. Early American Studies. Philadelphia: University of Pennsylvania Press. pp. 209–224. doi:10.9783/9780812293098-011. ISBN 978-0-8122-4841-8. JSTOR j.ctt1dfnrs7. LCCN 2016304619. OCLC 945028802.
- Schermerhorn, Calvin (2015). The Business of Slavery and the Rise of American Capitalism, 1815–1860. New Haven, Conn.: Yale University Press. doi:10.12987/9780300213898. ISBN 978-0-300-19200-1. JSTOR j.ctt1bh4d2w. LCCN 2014036403. OCLC 890614581.
- Schermerhorn, Calvin (2020). "2: 'Cash for Slaves' The African American Trail of Tears". In Bond, Beverly Greene; O'Donovan, Susan Eva (eds.). Remembering the Memphis Massacre: An American Story. University of Georgia Press. ISBN 9780820356495.
- Sherwin, Oscar (April 1945). "Trading in Negroes". Negro History Bulletin. 8 (7): 160–166. JSTOR 44214396.
- Spears, John R. (1900). "Chapter XVII: Tales of the Coastwise Slave Trade". The American slave-trade: an account of its origin, growth and suppression. Illustrated by Walter Appleton Clark. New York: Charles Scribner's Sons. LCCN 67027654. OCLC 421515. OL 23379348M.
- Stampp, Kenneth Milton (1956). "Six: Slavemongering". The peculiar institution: slavery in the ante-bellum South. Internet Archive. New York: Alfred A. Knopf. pp. 237–278.
- Steckel, Richard H.; Ziebarth, Nicolas (September 2013). "A Troublesome Statistic: Traders and Coastal Shipments in the Westward Movement of Slaves". The Journal of Economic History. 73 (3): 792–809. doi:10.1017/S0022050713000612. ISSN 0022-0507.
- Tadman, Michael (1996) [1989]. Speculators and Slaves: Masters, Traders, and Slaves in the Old South (2nd ed.). University of Wisconsin Press. ISBN 9780299118549. OCLC 34825947.
- Tadman, Michael (September 2007). "The Reputation of the Slave Trader in Southern History and the Social Memory of the South". American Nineteenth Century History. 8 (3): 247–271. doi:10.1080/14664650701505117. ISSN 1466-4658. S2CID 144552462.
- Wesley, C. H. “Manifests of Slave Shipments Along the Waterways, 1808–1864.” Journal of Negro History 27, no. 2 (1942): 155–174
- Yuhl, Stephanie E. (2013). "Hidden in Plain Sight: Centering the Domestic Slave Trade in American Public History". The Journal of Southern History. 79 (3): 593–624. JSTOR 23795089.

== Specific eras, markets, sales, ships, practices, etc. ==
- n.a. (1950). "Slavery and the Slave Trade in the District of Columbia". Negro History Bulletin. 14 (1): 7–18. ISSN 0028-2529. JSTOR 44212391.
- Bogert, Pen (2002). "Sold for My Account: The Early Slave Trade Between Kentucky and the Lower Mississippi Valley". Ohio Valley History. 2 (1): 3–16. ISSN 2377-0600.
- Carey, Bill (2018). "Part III: Buying and Selling". Runaways, Coffles and Fancy Girls: A History of Slavery in Tennessee. Nashville, Tennessee: Clearbrook Press. ISBN 978-0-9725680-4-3. LCCN 2018903570. OCLC 1045068878.
- Chambers, Douglas B. (December 2008). "Slave trade merchants of Spanish New Orleans, 1763–1803: Clarifying the colonial slave trade to Louisiana in Atlantic perspective". Atlantic Studies. 5 (3): 335–346. doi:10.1080/14788810802445024. ISSN 1478-8810.
- Clark, T. D. (December 1934). "The Slave Trade between Kentucky and the Cotton Kingdom". The Mississippi Valley Historical Review. 21 (3). Urbana, Illinois: Mississippi Valley Historical Association: 331–342. doi:10.2307/1897378. ISSN 0161-391X. JSTOR 1897378. OCLC 35781793.
- Colby, Robert (2023). "11: Waiting for Fevers to Abate: The Contagion and Fear in the Domestic Slave Trade". In Cooper, Mandy L.; Popp, Andrew (eds.). Business of Emotions in Modern History. London: Bloomsbury Academic. pp. 219–239. doi:10.5040/9781350268876.ch-11. ISBN 978-1-3502-6249-2. OCLC 1294194709.
- Colby, Robert K. D. (2024). An Unholy Traffic: Slave Trading in the Civil War South. Oxford University Press. doi:10.1093/oso/9780197578261.001.0001. ISBN 9780197578285. LCCN 2023053721. OCLC 1412042395.
- Coleman, J. Winston (1940). "VI: 'Niggah Tradahs' & Chapter VII: Down the River & Chapter VIII: 'Nigger Stealers'". Slavery Times in Kentucky. Chapel Hill: University of North Carolina Press. pp. 142–217.
- Corrigan, Mary Beth (2001). "Imaginary Cruelties? A History of the Slave Trade in Washington, D.C." Washington History. 13 (2): 4–27. ISSN 1042-9719. JSTOR 40073372.
- Davis, Robert Ralph (1971). "Buchanian Espionage: A Report on Illegal Slave Trading in the South in 1859". The Journal of Southern History. 37 (2): 271–278. doi:10.2307/2205824. ISSN 0022-4642. JSTOR 2205824.
- DeGraft-Hanson, Kwesi (February 18, 2010). "Unearthing the Weeping Time: Savannah's Ten Broeck Race Course and 1859 Slave Sale". Southern Spaces. 2010. doi:10.18737/M76K6J. ISSN 1551-2754.
- Finley, Alexandra (September 2017). "'Cash to Corinna': Domestic Labor and Sexual Economy in the 'Fancy Trade'". The Journal of American History. 104 (2): 410–430. doi:10.1093/jahist/jax174.
- Finkelman, Paul (2008). "Regulating the African Slave Trade". Civil War History. 54 (4): 379–405. doi:10.1353/cwh.0.0034. ISSN 1533-6271. S2CID 143987356.
- Flanders, Ralph Betts (1933). "Chapter VIII. The Acquisition and Hire of slaves". Plantation Slavery in Georgia. Chapel Hill: The University of North Carolina Press. LCCN 33037653. OCLC 9876467.
- Heier, Jan Richard (March 2010). "Accounting for the Business of Suffering: A Study of the Antebellum Richmond, Virginia, Slave Trade". Abacus: A Journal of Accounting, Finance, and Business Studies. 46 (1): 60–83. doi:10.1111/j.1467-6281.2010.00306.x.
- Johnson, Walter (June 2000). "The Slave Trader, the White Slave, and the Politics of Racial Determination in the 1850s". The Journal of American History. 87 (1): 13–38. doi:10.2307/2567914. JSTOR 2567914.
- Jones, William D. (2021). "Beyond New Orleans: Forced Migrations To, From, and In Louisiana, 1820–1860". Louisiana History: The Journal of the Louisiana Historical Association. 62 (4): 429–468. ISSN 0024-6816. JSTOR 27095320.
- Kendall, John S. (January 1939). "Shadow Over the City". The Louisiana Historical Quarterly. 22 (1). New Orleans: Louisiana Historical Society: 142–165. ISSN 0095-5949. OCLC 1782268. LDS Film 1425689, Image Group Number (DGS) 1640025 – via FamilySearch Digital Library.
- Kerr-Ritchie, Jeffrey R. (2019). Rebellious Passage: The Creole Revolt and America's Coastal Slave Trade. Cambridge: Cambridge University Press. doi:10.1017/9781108616324. ISBN 9781108616324. LCCN 2018043005. OCLC 1055433726. S2CID 166472669.
- Laprade, William T. (January 1926). "The Domestic Slave Trade in the District of Columbia". The Journal of Negro History. 11 (1): 17–34. doi:10.2307/2714021. ISSN 0022-2992. JSTOR 2714021.
- Lucas, Marion B. (2014) [1992]. "4. The Slave Trade". A History of Blacks in Kentucky: From Slavery to Segregation, 1760–1891 (2nd ed.). Frankfort, Kentucky: Kentucky Historical Society. doi:10.2307/j.ctt1w76tk3. ISBN 9780813159775. JSTOR j.ctt1w76tk3. OCLC 1007290645. Project MUSE book 56781.
- Marks, John (2007). "Abdication and Acceptance: Slave-Trading in Antebellum Lynchburg". Agora. 16. Lynchburg College: 12. Article 16.
- McElveen, A. J.; Oakes, Ziba B. (2010). Drago, Edmond Lee (ed.). Broke by the War: Letters of a Slave Trader. University of South Carolina Press. ISBN 978-1570039423.
- McInnis, Maurie D. (Fall 2013). "Mapping the slave trade in Richmond and New Orleans". Building & Landscapes. 20 (2): 102–125. doi:10.5749/buildland.20.2.0102. JSTOR 10.5749/buildland.20.2.0102. S2CID 160472953. Project MUSE 538683.
- Mooney, Chase C. (1971) [1957]. "Two: Hire, Sale, Theft and Flight of Slaves". Slavery in Tennessee. Indiana University Publications, Social Science Series No. 17 (Reprint ed.). Westport, Conn.: Negro Universities Press. OCLC 609222448 – via HathiTrust.
- Rucker, Paul (March 2016). "Slave Traders in Baltimore: Location Information" (PDF). In Light of History. 1 (1). Baltimore: Reginald F. Lewis Museum: 2–3.
- Rupprecht, Anita (September 2019). "Black Atlantic maritime networks, resistance and the American 'domestic' slave trade". Global Networks. 19 (4): 458–476. doi:10.1111/glob.12209. ISSN 1470-2266.
- Russell, Thomas D. (2025) [1997]. "Slave Auctions on the Courthouse Steps: Court Sales of Slaves in Antebellum South Carolina". In Finkelman, Paul (ed.). Slavery & The Law. Madison House Publishers. pp. 329–364. doi:10.5040/9798881826758-chapter11. ISBN 979-8-8818-2675-8. LCCN 96008917. OCLC 1528562801.
- Schermerhorn, Calvin (October 2, 2015). "Slave Trading in a Republic of Credit: Financial Architecture of the US Slave Market, 1815–1840". Slavery & Abolition. 36 (4): 586–602. doi:10.1080/0144039X.2015.1049004. ISSN 0144-039X. S2CID 146765520.
- Sellers, James Benson (2015) [1950]. "5: Traffic in Slaves". Slavery in Alabama. Library of Alabama Classics. Introduction by Harriet E. Amos Doss. Tuscaloosa: University of Alabama Press. ISBN 9780817389147. LCCN 50004433. OCLC 899157440.
- Shugerman, Jed Handelsman (Summer 2002). "The Louisiana Purchase and South Carolina's Reopening of the Slave Trade in 1803". Journal of the Early Republic. 22 (2): 263–290. doi:10.2307/3125182. JSTOR 3125182.
- Smith, Julia (October 12, 2021). "Slavetrading in Antebellum Florida". Florida Historical Quarterly. 50 (3).
- Tadman, Michael (1996). "The Hidden History of Slave Trading in Antebellum South Carolina: John Springs III and Other 'Gentlemen Dealing in Slaves'". The South Carolina Historical Magazine. 97 (1): 6–29. JSTOR 27570133.
- Trammell, Jack (2012). The Richmond Slave Trade: The Economic Backbone of the Old Dominion. The History Press. ISBN 978-1-60949-413-1.
- Trexler, Harrison Anthony (1914). Slavery in Missouri, 1804–1865. Johns Hopkins University studies in historical and political science. Vol. XXXIII. Baltimore: The Johns Hopkins Press. pp. 44–53. LCCN 14013126.
- Wahl, Jenny B. (March 1996). "The Jurisprudence of American Slave Sales". The Journal of Economic History. 56 (1): 143–169. doi:10.1017/S0022050700016053. ISSN 0022-0507.
- Wax, Darold D. (1984). ""New Negroes Are Always in Demand": The Slave Trade in Eighteenth-Century Georgia". The Georgia Historical Quarterly. 68 (2): 193–220. ISSN 0016-8297. JSTOR 40581222.
- Williams, Jennie K. (April 2, 2020). "Trouble the water: The Baltimore to New Orleans coastwise slave trade, 1820–1860". Slavery & Abolition. 41 (2): 275–303. doi:10.1080/0144039X.2019.1660509. ISSN 0144-039X. S2CID 203494471.
- Wilson, Carol (2009) [1994]. Freedom at Risk: The Kidnapping of Free Blacks in America, 1780–1865. University Press of Kentucky. ISBN 9780813149790. JSTOR j.ctt130j5m9. LCCN 93021012. OCLC 900344359.

== Specific traders and trading companies ==
- Calderhead, William (1977). "The Role of the Professional Slave Trader in a Slave Economy: Austin Woolfolk, A Case Study". Civil War History. 23 (3): 195–211. doi:10.1353/cwh.1977.0041. ISSN 1533-6271. S2CID 143907436. – Austin Woolfolk
- Forret, Jeff (2020). Williams' Gang: A Notorious Slave Trader and his Cargo of Black Convicts. Cambridge University Press. doi:10.1017/9781108651912. ISBN 9781108651912. S2CID 240924397. – Thomas Williams and William H. Williams
- Gudmestad, Robert H. (2003). "The Troubled Legacy of Isaac Franklin: The Enterprise of Slave Trading". Tennessee Historical Quarterly. 62 (3): 193–217. JSTOR 42627764. – Isaac Franklin
- Howell, Isabel (1943). "John Armfield, Slave-trader". Tennessee Historical Quarterly. 2 (1): 3–29. ISSN 0040-3261. JSTOR 42620772. – John Armfield
- Huebner, Timothy S. (March 2023). "Taking Profits, Making Myths: The Slave Trading Career of Nathan Bedford Forrest". Civil War History. 69 (1): 42–75. doi:10.1353/cwh.2023.0009. ISSN 1533-6271. S2CID 256599213. Project MUSE 879775. – N. B. Forrest
- Rothman, Joshua D. (2021). The Ledger and the Chain: How Domestic Slave Traders Shaped America. Basic Books. ISBN 9781541616592. LCCN 2020038845. – Franklin & Armfield
- Rothman, Joshua D. (May 2022). "The American Life of Jourdan Saunders, Slave Trader". Journal of Southern History. 88 (2): 227–256. doi:10.1353/soh.2022.0054. ISSN 2325-6893. S2CID 248826158. – Jourdan M. Saunders
- Soodalter, Ron (2010). Hanging Captain Gordon: The Life and Trial of an American Slave Trader. Atria Books. ISBN 9781416522928. – Nathanael Gordon
- Stephenson, Wendell (1938). Isaac Franklin: Slave Trader and Planter of the Old South. Baton Rouge: Louisiana State University Press. – Isaac Franklin
- Tansey, Richard (1982). "Bernard Kendig and the New Orleans Slave Trade". Louisiana History: The Journal of the Louisiana Historical Association. 23 (2): 159–178. ISSN 0024-6816. JSTOR 4232168. – Bernard Kendig
- Trent, Hank (2017). The Secret Life of Bacon Tait, a White Slave Trader Married to a Free Woman of Color. Baton Rouge: Louisiana State University. ISBN 9780807165218. – Bacon Tait
- Winter, Kari J. (2011). The American Dreams of John B. Prentis, Slave Trader. Race in the Atlantic world, 1700-1900. Athens, Ga.: University of Georgia Press. ISBN 9780820339535. JSTOR j.ctt46n9nn. LCCN 2010047425. OCLC 882236612. – John B. Prentis
- Westmoreland, Carl B. (2015). "The John W. Anderson Slave Pen". Freedom Center Journal. University of Cincinnati College of Law. ISSN 1942-5856. Volume 2015, Issue 1, Article 3. – John W. Anderson

== Unpublished theses and dissertations ==
- Colby, Robert (2015). The Continuance of an Unholy Traffic: The Virginia Slave Trade During the Civil War (Thesis). University of North Carolina. doi:10.17615/12QS-6B46.
- Davila, Lauren (2023). Public Memory of the Domestic Slave Trade in Charleston, South Carolina (Thesis). College of Charleston. ProQuest 30424546.
- Finley, Alexandra Jolyn (2017). Blood Money: Sex, Family, and Finance in the Antebellum Slave Trade (Thesis). College of William & Mary. doi:10.21220/S2FH3D. Paper 1499450046.
- Fitzpatrick, Benjamin Lewis (December 2008). Negroes for Sale: The Slave Trade in Antebellum Kentucky (Ph.D. thesis). University of Notre Dame. doi:10.7274/pn89d50750n.
- Gordon, Tiye (January 2015). The Fancy Trade and the Commodification of Rape in the Sexual Economy of 19th Century U.S. Slavery (Thesis).
- Kies, Tim (2018). Commodified Kin: Enslaved Families' Responses to the Antebellum Domestic Slave Trade in the Chesapeake (Thesis). Leiden University. hdl:1887/61175.
- Ridgeway, Michael A. (1976). A Peculiar Business: Slave Trading in Alexandria, Virginia, 1825–1861 (M.A. thesis). Georgetown University.
- Tadman, Michael (1977). Speculators and slaves in the old South: a study of the American domestic slave trade, 1820–1860 (Thesis). University of Hull.
- Troutman, Phillip Davis (August 2000). Slave Trade and Sentiment in Antebellum Virginia (Thesis). University of Virginia. doi:10.18130/v36d22.
- Yagyu, Tomoko (2006). Slave Traders and Planters in the Expanding South: Entrepreneurial Strategies, Business Networks, and Western Migration in the Atlantic World, 1787–1859 (PDF) (Thesis). University of North Carolina, Chapel Hill. doi:10.17615/vatj-2e80.

== Historic site and archaeology reports ==
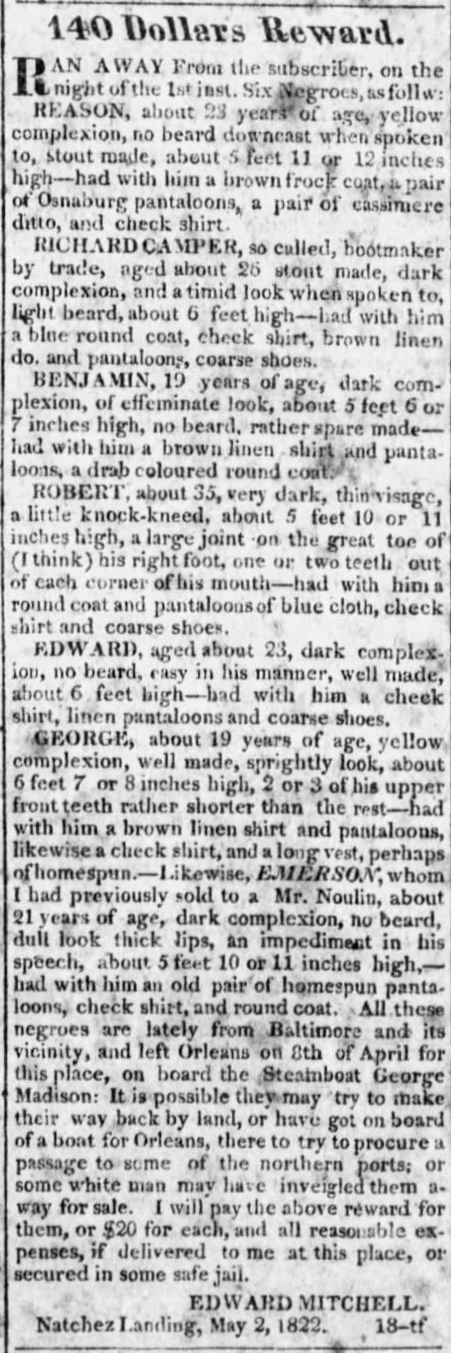
"...all these negroes are lately from Baltimore and its vicinity... " Natchez Gazette, May 4, 1822

- n.a. (2022). Forks of the Road – Natchez National Historical Park – Cultural Landscapes Inventory (PDF) (Report). U.S. National Park Service.
- Bedell, John; Kraus, Lisa; Decker, Charles Lee (January 2010). Archaeology of the Bruin Slave Jail (Site 44AX0172) (PDF) (Report). Office of Historic Alexandria – City of Alexandria, Virginia.
- Equal Justice Initiative (2018). Montgomery (Alabama) Slave Trade (Report). Equal Justice Initiative. pp. 31–49. JSTOR resrep30693.5. (alt: eji.org – Montgomery Slave Trade)
- Skolnik, Benjamin A. (January 2021). 1315 Duke Street – Building and Property History (PDF) (Report). Office of Historic Alexandria – City of Alexandria, Virginia.

== Selected newspaper and magazine articles ==
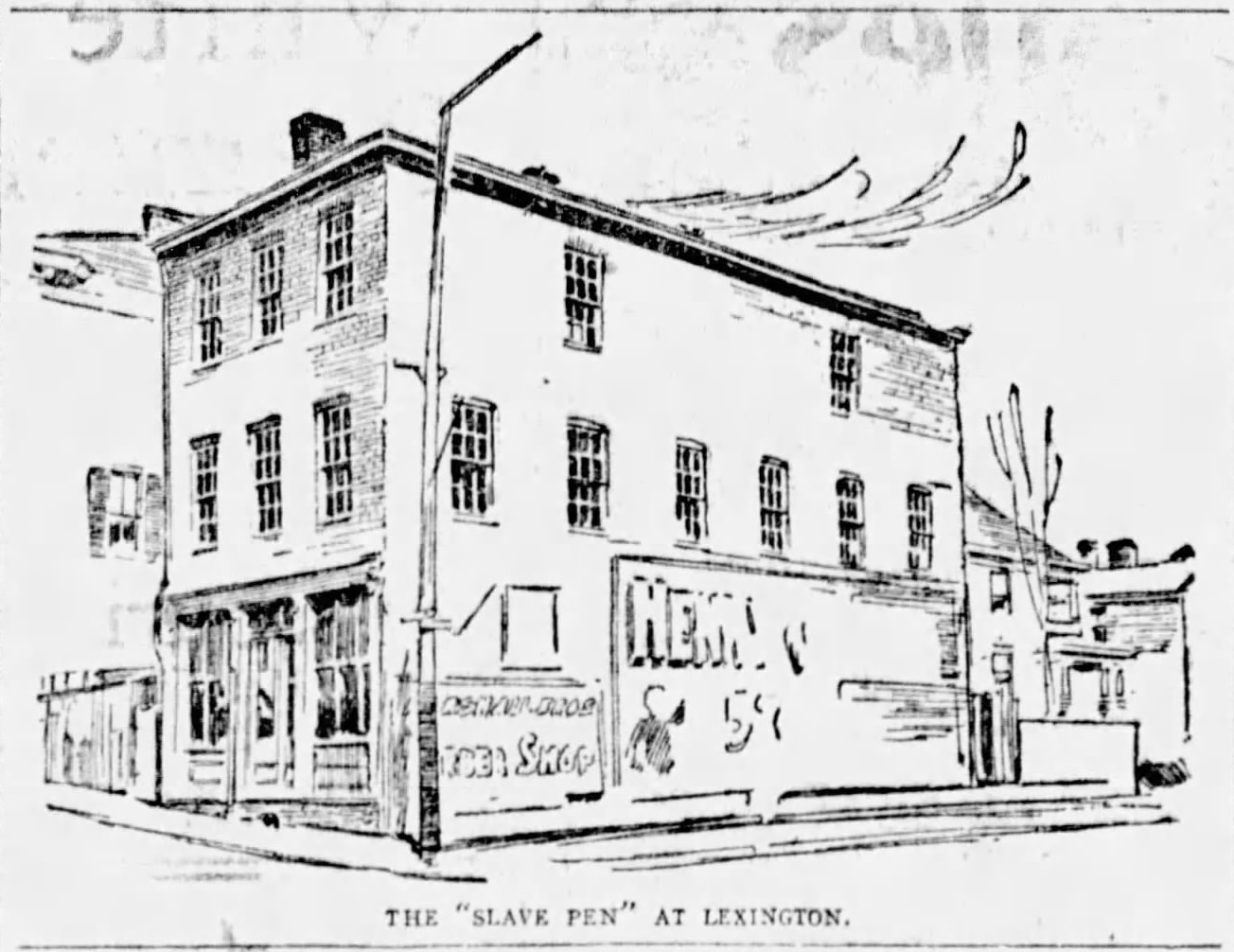
Slave pen of "Nigger Trader White" on Main Street Lexington, Missouri, newspaper illustration 1908

- n.a. (May 24, 1884). "The Last of His Kind: Talk with an Old Slave-Seller Who Lags Superfluous on the Stage". St. Louis Globe-Democrat. St. Louis, Mo. p. 12.
- n.a. (March 6, 1888). "A Landmark Going: The Old Slave Mart of Nashville to Be Demolished". Memphis Avalanche. Memphis, Tenn. p. 1 – via Newspapers.com.
- n.a. (April 22, 1888). "Southern Slave Marts: How Negroes Were Bought and Sold at Nashville, Tenn". The Critic. Vol. I, no. 10. Allentown, Pennsylvania. Chicago Times Syndicate. p. 6. ISSN 2641-3825. OCLC 137343977.
- n.a. (March 28, 1916). "Another Modern Building Will Occupy Site of Former Slave Depot". The Montgomery Times. Montgomery, Ala. p. 1 – via Newspapers.com.
- Bailey, Anne C. (February 12, 2020). "They Sold Human Beings Here". The New York Times. Photographs by Danielle Bowman. ISSN 0362-4331.
- Beale, Solon (August 22, 1855). Wheeler & Lynde (ed.). "The Slave Prisons of Baltimore". Bangor Daily Whig and Courier. Vol. XXII, no. 44. Bangor, Maine. p. 2.
- Calos, Katherine; Moomaw, Graham (February 23, 2014). "Special Report: Piecing Together Richmond's Slave Trade (Part 1 of 4)". Richmond Times-Dispatch. Virginia. p. A1., "(Part 2 of 4)". p. A10., "(Part 3 of 4)". p. A11. & "(Part 4 of 4)". p. A12.
- Fox, Lloyd (May 4, 2022). "Seeing the Unseen: Baltimore's slave trade". Baltimore Sun. Photographs by Amy Davis.
- Hafner, Katherine (February 19, 2022). "Forgotten history of Hampton Roads slave trade recollected". The Virginian-Pilot. Norfolk, Va.
- Kambourian, Elizabeth Cann (February 23, 2014). "Slave traders in Richmond (1819–1864)". Richmond Times-Dispatch. Virginia. pp. A12. (alt: "Slave traders in Richmond" at richmond.com)
- Rothman, Joshua D.; Skolnik, Benjamin (December 4, 2021). "The Brig Named Uncas: The story of an all-American slave ship". Slate. ISSN 1091-2339.
- Rothman, Joshua D. (October 6, 2021). "How the brutal trade in enslaved people has been whitewashed out of U.S. history". Opinion. Pennsylvania Capital-Star.
- Tiernan, Stanton (September 13, 1936). "Baltimore's Old Slave Markets: In 1835 the City Boasted a Dozen Well-Established Dealers". The Sunday Sun. The Baltimore Sun. Vol. 36-D. p. 10.

== 19th-century sources ==
- Andrews, E. A.; American Union for the Relief and Improvement of the Colored Race (1836). Slavery and the domestic slave-trade in the United States: In a series of letters addressed to the Executive committee of the American union for the relief and improvement of the colored race. Boston: Light and Stearns.
- Armistead, Wilson, ed. (1853). Five hundred thousand strokes for freedom: a series of anti-slavery tracts. Reprints of nos. 1-82 of the Leeds anti-slavery series. London: W. & F. Cash. LCCN 05023103. OCLC 7021926. archive: fivehundredthous00armi.
- Bowditch, William Ingersoll (1849). Slavery and the Constitution. Boston: R. F. Wallcut. LCCN 04030414. OCLC 4888406. OL 25408737M.
- Davies, Ebenezer (1849). American scenes and Christian slavery: a recent tour of four thousand miles in the United States. London: J. Snow. LCCN a15001618. OCLC 65316801. OL 5706830M.
- Goodell, William (1853). "Chapter II: The Slave Traffic". The American slave code in theory and practice: its distinctive features shown by its statutes, judicial decisions and illustrative facts. New York, American and foreign anti-slavery society. hdl:2027/loc.ark:/13960/t7np25m2c. JSTOR community.35006805. LCCN 11008422. OCLC 221351046. OL 13512682M.
- Jay, William (1844) [1839]. A View of the Action of the Federal Government, In Behalf of Slavery (Original publisher: New-York, J.S. Taylor). Appendix: The Amistad Case by Joshua Leavitt. Utica, N.Y.: J.C. Jackson for the New York State Anti-Slavery Society. LCCN 05023101. OCLC 8529817.
- Stowe, Harriet Beecher (1853). A key to Uncle Tom's cabin: presenting the original facts and documents upon which the story is founded. Boston: J. P. Jewett & Co. LCCN 02004230. OCLC 317690900. OL 21879838M.
- Weld, Theodore Dwight; Grimké, Angelina; Grimké, Sarah Moore (1839). American Slavery As It Is: Testimony of a Thousand Witnesses. American Anti-Slavery Society. New York: Published by the American Anti-Slavery Society, office, no. 143 Nassau Street. LCCN 11008377. OCLC 14906369. OL 20509019M.
- Weld, Theodore D.; General Anti-slavery Convention (1841). Slavery and the Internal Slave Trade in the United States of North America. Executive Committee of the American Anti-slavery Society. London: T. Ward. LCCN 05017902. OCLC 954281651. OL 7027374M.

== Outdated ==
Note: Outdated per Tadman in Oxford Handbook of Slavery in the Americas (2010).

- Collins, Winfield H. (1904). The Domestic Slave Trade of our Southern States. New York: Broadway Publishing. LCCN 04030987. OCLC 3109380. OL 5298638M.
- Phillips, Ulrich B. (1966) [1918]. American Negro Slavery: A Survey of the Supply, Employment and Control of Negro Labor as Determined by the Plantation Regime (Reprint ed.). Baton Rouge: Louisiana State University Press. ISBN 978-0807101094. LCCN 66031730. OCLC 4969724. OL 13992719M.
- Phillips, Ulrich B. (2007) [1929]. Life and Labor in the Old South. Southern Classics Series. Introduction by John David Smith. Columbia, S.C.: University of South Carolina Press. ISBN 978-1-57003-678-1. LCCN 2006032556. OCLC 73926438.

== Bibliographies and book reviews ==
- Slavery and Slaving in World History: A Bibliography – Bibliography of Slavery and World Slaving (virginia.edu)
- Bell, Richard (December 2013). "The Great Jugular Vein of Slavery: New Histories of the Domestic Slave Trade". History Compass. 11 (12): 1150–1164. doi:10.1111/hic3.12114. ISSN 1478-0542.
- McDaniel, W. Caleb (December 5, 2023). "The Slave Traders' Economy". The American Historical Review. 128 (4): 1814–1817. doi:10.1093/ahr/rhad465. ISSN 0002-8762.
- Tadman, Michael (2010). "Chapter 28. Internal Slave Trades". In Smith, Mark M.; Paquette, Robert L. (eds.). The Oxford Handbook of Slavery in the Americas. Oxford Handbooks in History. Oxford University Press. pp. 625–642. doi:10.1093/oxfordhb/9780199227990.013.0029. ISBN 9780191743979. LCCN 2010927240. OCLC 838126420. OL 28449640M.

== See also ==
- List of abolitionist newspapers in the United States
- List of American slave traders
- Historiography of the United States § Slavery and Black history
- List of bibliographies on American history
- Bibliography of slavery in the United States
- List of publications of William Garrison and Isaac Knapp
