= Mason Harwell =

American slave trader (1806–1879)

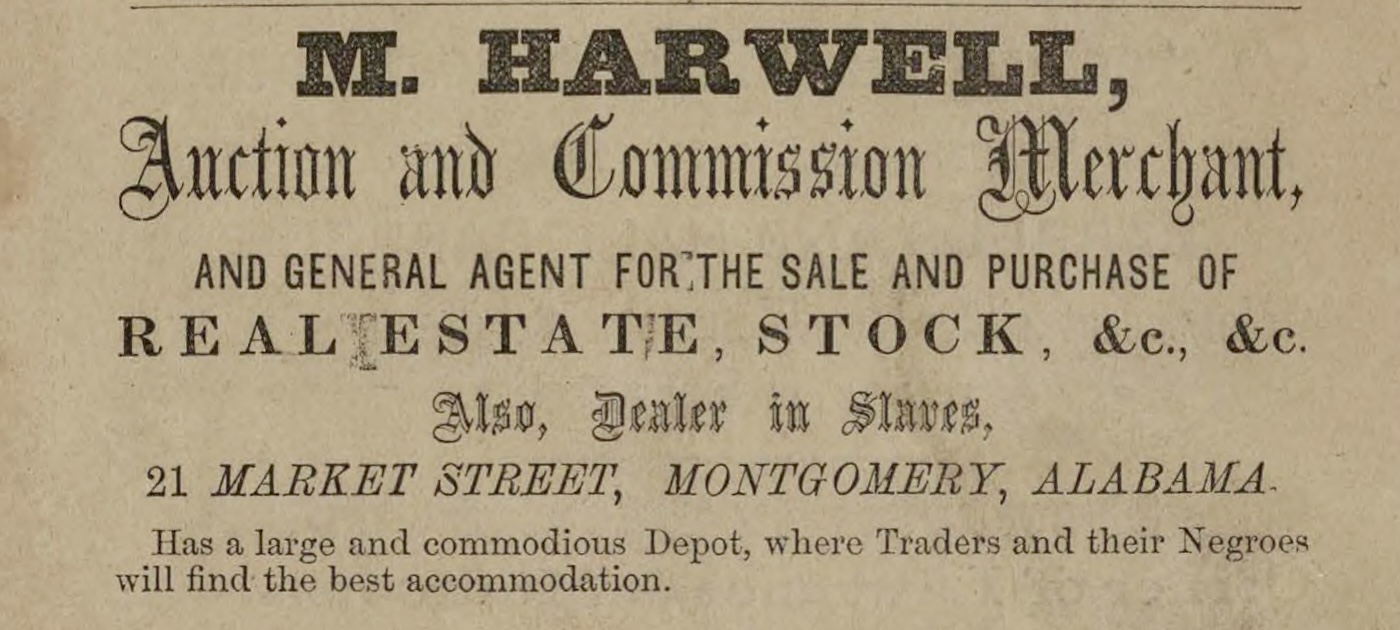
- "M. Harwell, Auction and Commission Merchant, Also Dealer in Slaves," 1859 Montgomery city directory
- Born: February 14, 1806; Mississippi Territory, U.S.
- Died: May 7, 1879 (aged 73); Montgomery, Alabama, U.S.
- Occupations: Slave trader, commission merchant, auctioneer, insurance salesman

Mason Harwell (February 14, 1806 – May 7, 1879) was an auctioneer, insurance broker, and a leading, if not the leading, slave trader in antebellum Montgomery, Alabama. According to Slavery in Alabama (1950), "After 1840 Montgomery was the principal market in the state." Sales in 1850s Montgomery often took place outdoors at a central landmark called the Artesian Basin. Around the turn of the century, an older resident of Montgomery told historian Frederic Bancroft, author of Slave-Trading in the Old South, that Harwell was "a man of respectable standing." Mason Harwell worked out of 21 Market Street (now Dexter). He had a second location at Coosa St. and Monroe.

== Biography ==
Harwell was said to have been born in Washington County, Alabama, when Alabama was still part of the Mississippi Territory. In 1830, Harwell was resident in the pioneer settlement of Washington, Alabama, living in a household of five free whites. In 1839, Harwell obtained a land patent from the government of 80 acres at 1 E½SE ST STEPHENS No 17N 29E 11. He supposedly moved to Montgomery County, Alabama, about 40 years before his death, thus around 1839. At the time of the 1850 federal census Harwell listed his occupation as auctioneer. The Alabama state census of 1850 listed Harwell as the head of a household of nine free whites and five enslaved people.

According to Charles S. Davis' The Cotton Kingdom in Alabama, Harwell was "one of the most active dealers" in enslaved people of 1850s Alabama, although "from his advertisements in the newspapers one might infer that he was a general auctioneer for on his own account; he bought and sold almost everything, including railroad stock. He also carried on various kinds of slave trading, including a hiring agency, and as a representative of the Knickerbocker Life Insurance Company of New York, he was always ready to insure slaves at 'reasonable rates.' " In 1916, upon the occasion of the demolition of an old building on Dexter, the Montgomery Times described what had been the city's antebellum slave depot:

Before the war it was known as the principal slave depot of Montgomery, which was one of the largest slave markets in the south. Traders would bring their slaves through from North Carolina and Virginia and stop here in Montgomery, selling as many as they could and then take the remainder on to some other market where they would be disposed of. The entrance to the slave depot was through an entrance where the east half of The Advertiser building now stands, and up to the time it was torn down for the new structure that occupies it, some ten or twelve years ago, the bars that were placed at the entrance to keep slaves from escaping at night were still in position. They entered the slave depot through this enclosure and the depot extended up the street to the lot where the Grand theatre now stands. Sixth avenue, between Lawrence and McDonough contained three slave depots."

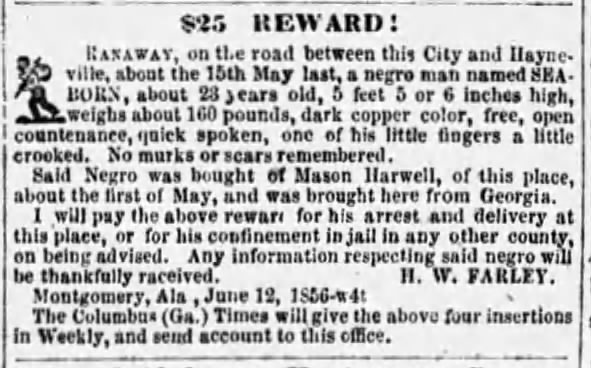
"...said negro was bought of Mason Harwell..." The Weekly Advertiser, Montgomery, Ala., June 18, 1856

In 1860, Harwell built an "impressive brick house on Lawrence street." His occupation at the time of the 1860 federal census was "auction & commis." He owned real estate valued at US$25,000 (equivalent to $895,833 in 2025) and had personal wealth, including the value of slaves owned, of US$20,000 (equivalent to $716,667 in 2025). He was listed on the 1860 slave schedules as the legal enslaver of 34 people, ranging in age from 55 years to seven months old. On June 28, 1863, at age 57, he enlisted in the Edmund Harrison's Company, Alabama Rebels, part of the Alabama Home Guard. On August 27, the Confederate Army paid or promised Harwell 500 Confederate dollars for a horse. On October 25 of the same year he was paid or promised 50.50 Confederate dollars for a stove and "drayage of same." On June 7, 1864, he was paid or promised 90 Confederate dollars for 18 brooms for use in a Confederate military hospital.

On July 24, 1865, Mason Harwell swore allegiance to the United States, completing the Confederate pardon-amnesty process, and was readmitted to the Union. In 1867, Harwell registered to vote in Precinct 5 of Montgomery, Alabama. At the time of the 1870 census, he owned real estate worth US$5,000 (equivalent to $127,303 in 2025) and his personal estate was valued at US$1,000 (equivalent to $25,461 in 2025).

Harwell died of apoplexy in 1879 at his desk in his office at 23 Market Street. The Montgomery Advertiser remarked in the death announcement, "Mr. Harwell enjoyed an enviable character for honesty, integrity and fair dealing, and possessed rare business qualifications. He leaves a widow, several children and numerous acquaintances and friends to mourn his loss." Just before Christmas 1879, Harwell's widow hosted two probate-mandated estate sales. The first was a sale of personal property at the family home "about one mile south of Montgomery, Alabama." The second was a sale, at the Artesian Basin in downtown Montgomery, of six mules.

A 1921 biography of one of Harwell's sons-in-law noted that Confederate veteran Charles A. Allen had served as clerk of revenue for Montgomery County for almost 20 years and was "a Democrat, a Mason, a Ku Klux, and Baptist." A biography of his son C. H. Harwell, Confederate veteran and businessman, described Mason Harwell as, simply, a "commission merchant" of Montgomery.

== See also ==
- List of Alabama slave traders
- History of Montgomery, Alabama
