= Winfield H. Collins =

American historian (~1869–1927)

Winfield Hazlitt Collins (June 1, 1868/1869/1870 (Note: Records conflict as to birth year, with the Library of Congress recording 1868, censuses suggesting 1869, and 1870 appearing on his grave marker and as a correction on his death certificate. Spelling of middle name is also variously presented as Hazlitt or Hazilett, etc.) – June 5, 1927) was an early 20th-century American history professor and writer. Now regarded as a "thoroughgoing white supremacist," Collins was the author of The Domestic Slave Trade of our Southern States (1904) and a "vigorous defense" of lynching in the United States called The Truth About Lynching and the Negro in the South, In Which the Author Pleads That the South Be Made Safe for the White Race (1918). His history of the slave trade in the United States "directly reflected proslavery sources and agendas." A contemporary review of the lynching book by Judge Milledge Lipscomb Bonham deemed it "disappointing; it discourages rather than stimulates more serious study of this great question." Collins' work was the basis for Congressman James F. Byrnes' opposition to federal anti-lynching legislation.

Collins was born in Dorchester County, Maryland, and graduated from Western Maryland College with a B.A. in 1894. He was awarded a Master of Arts in history from Yale University in 1900. He also attended University of Kansas City. In 1905 Collins was a professor of English, economics and history at Simmons College in Abilene, Texas. In 1917, he was part of the summer faculty of Mansfield State Normal School in Pennsylvania. At one time he was associated with Claremont College in Hickory, North Carolina. He had "experience in every department of teaching: rural schools, high school and university." A Winfield H. Collins appears in the 1919 Washington, D.C. city directory occupation "clk war," likely meaning clerk at the War Department. He died of pneumonia in Middlesboro, Kentucky in 1927.

== See also ==
- Bibliography of the slave trade in the United States
- Nadir of American race relations
- Thomas P. Bailey § "Racial creed of the Southern people"
