= First Klan =

First operational era of the Ku Klux Klan

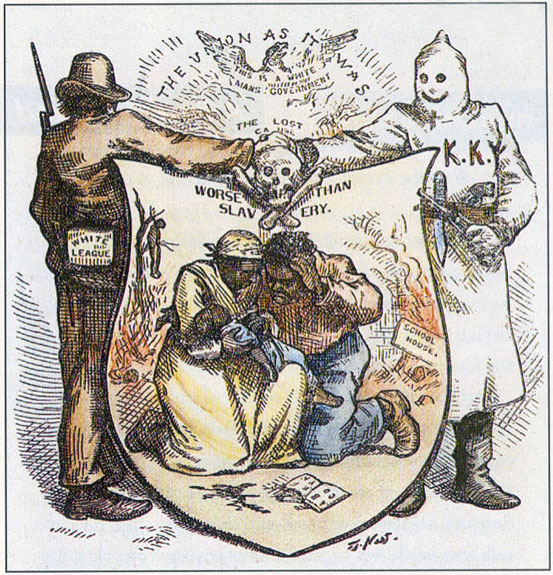
"White Leagues and the KKK, worse than slavery" by Thomas Nast, 1874

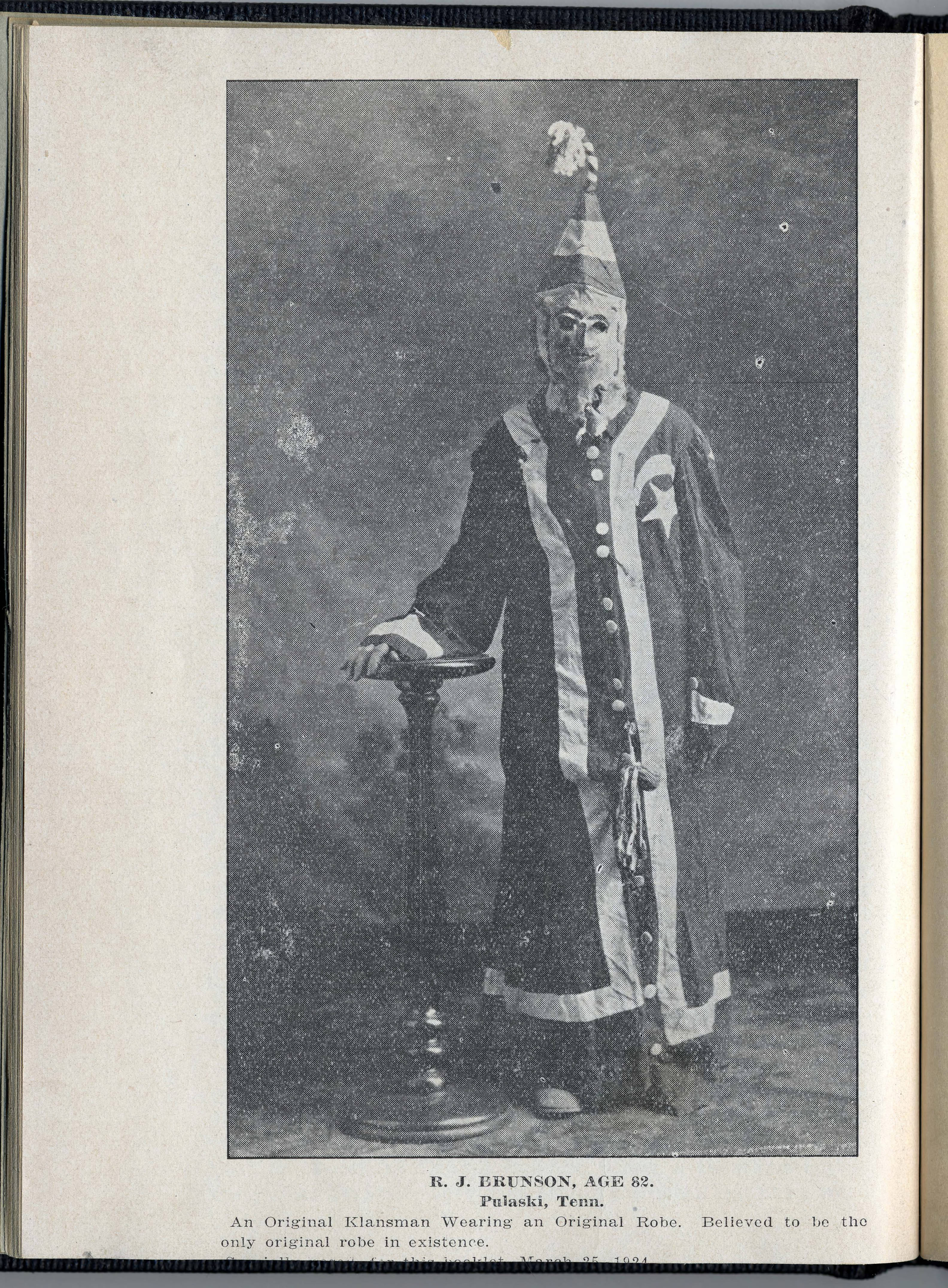
"R. J. Brunson of Pulaski, Tennessee, aged 82. He was part of the original Klan and is wearing an original robe," image published in 1924 (Tennessee Virtual Archive)

The First Klan is a retronym which is used to describe the first of three distinct operational eras in the history of the Ku Klux Klan, a White supremacist domestic terrorist group in the United States. The First Klan, or the Reconstruction Klan, was followed by the Second Klan, which reached its peak in the 1920s, and the Third Klan, which has been extant since the 1960s. According to historian Carl N. Degler, "Aside from the name, about the only common trait that the three Klans possess is vigilantism."

The first Klan was extant during the Reconstruction Era which followed the defeat of the Confederacy in the American Civil War. (There were numerous similar groups which operated under other names: Red Shirts, Knights of the White Camellia, the Black Cavalry, etc.) The goal of this Klan was to intimidate freedmen and reformers ("niggers, carpetbaggers, and scalawags") into surrendering their newly gained political and social power over what had once been the hegemonic White system of the Old South. According to a report published in 1976, "The extent of these Klan activities will never be known. Nor can it ever be determined the extent of fear that such activities engendered in their targets. Although it is known that close to 1,000 murders were committed by Klansmen, this figure represents only a very small part of the Klan terror." Federal investigations and prosecutions such as the South Carolina Ku Klux Klan Trials of 1871–1872 and legislation such as the Ku Klux Klan Act attempted to expose and to repress the group.

Unlike the Second Klan, which was a national organization, the First Klan was primarily a regional entity, most active in those former slave states that had supplied the most manpower to the Confederacy. This group largely achieved its goals following the Compromise of 1877 and as a result, it slowly declined in significance.

== Organization ==
As the Klan concept spread outward from Tennessee in 1867 and 1868, the basic structure of the Klan was State – Congressional District – County, reflecting their preoccupation with reserving representative democracy for themselves alone. State leaders were called Grand Dragons of the Realm, congressional district leaders were Grand Titans of the Dominion, and county leaders were Grand Giants of the Province.

In Walton County, Georgia, a "typical" Southern county with a population of 11,000 in 1870, "there were three dens of Klansmen...each with approximately 75 to 100 members." The president of Spartanburg Female College in South Carolina estimated that roughly 80 percent of White male voters in Spartanburg County were in the Klan in 1870–1871. Between them they victimized 227 people, and killed four African-American members of the South Carolina State Militia. In Mississippi, there is evidence of collaboration between small-town Klans as both a means of operational security and as for increased manpower: "The Ku Klux Klan of Winona went to Grenada and were likewise aided by the Grenada Klan. In this way there was less chance of being recognized."

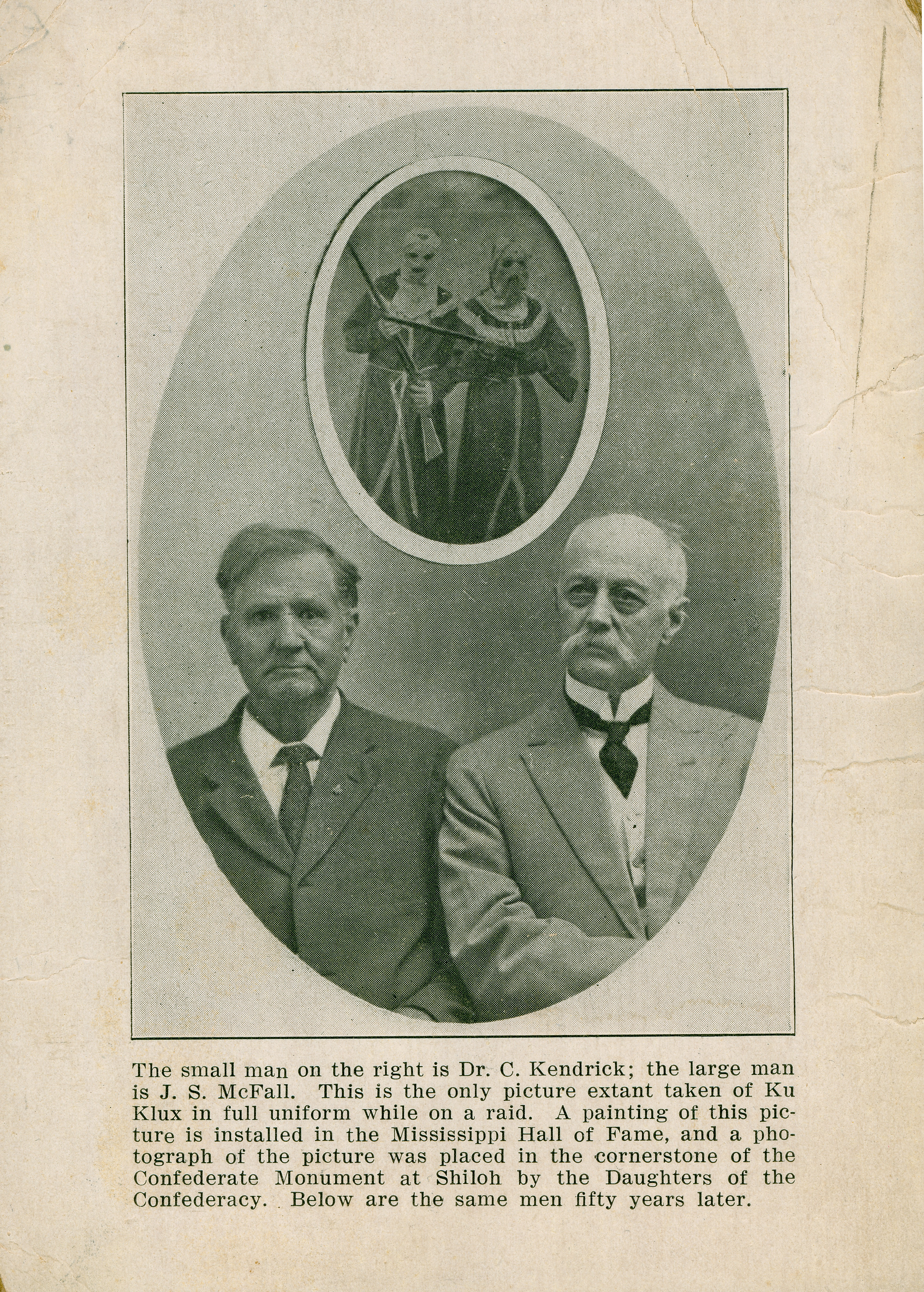
Klansmen Dr. C. Kendrick and J.S. McFall c. 1870 (inset, top) and c. 1910 (Missouri Historical Society P0084-0799)

The First Klan was often a flamboyantly-styled continuation of the antebellum slave patrol. Typically horse-mounted, well-armed, and functioning at the behest of Whites who rested atop any given region's socioeconomic ladder, the pre-war slave patrol begat the wartime bushwhacker begat the post-war Klan paramilitary. Per historian Michael Fitzgerald, the main "difference was that planters lost their financial motivation to protect slaves' lives. Little restrained self-appointed patrollers after the war."

Horse-mounted hunters versus freedmen often without the means to afford proper shoes was a succinct visual summary of the power dynamic at work. As Walter Johnson wrote about escaped slaves, "Beginning with the idea of the horse as a tool that converted grain into policing, one might define the several dimensions of horse-borne slaveholding power...More than that, as the historian Rhys Isaac long ago observed, a slaveholder (or patroller) on horseback visually commanded the landscape; traveling several feet above 'eye level' vastly expanded the immediate field of slaveholding power."

One Alabama survivor of slavery, "Nancy Pugh, decades later, mixed the Klan and prewar patrols together indiscriminately in her memory."

== Practices ==
According to professor William Peirce Randel, the Klan had three advantages in its war on Radical Reconstruction: "operations in total secrecy, the ability to ignore forms of legalism, and the support of the great majority of the Southern Whites." The first and second of these advantages were combined in the fact that "the Klan's capacity for deceit was virtually limitless. Editors and politicians who were subsequently proved to have been Klansmen themselves derided the very notion that a Klan existed."

According to one history of Reconstruction in Mississippi, "The oath taken at initiation was as follows: 'You do solemnly swear, in the presence of Almighty God and before this assembly of witnesses, that you will do the acts commanded of you by the commander of this Ku Klux Klan, outside of the civil law, so help you God.' The question put to the candidate when initiated was: 'What are the objects of the Ku Klux Klan?' Answer: 'It is to suppress the negro and keep him in the position where he belongs, and to see that the Democratic party controls this country.'"

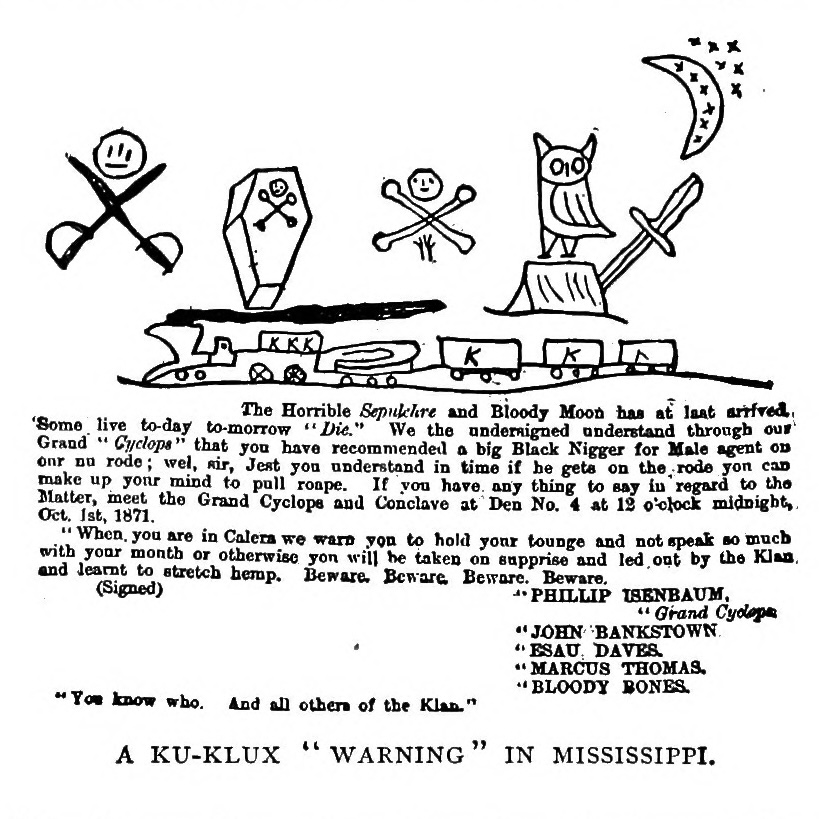
Ku-Klux warning message from Mississippi

A different Mississippi county history recounts, "The costume worn by members of the klan was usually made by their wives. It was either a white, loose-flowing garment or a black robe with white stripes across the breast, and a tall, pointed cap, 3/4 of a yard long. They wore tin buttons on the front of their clothes. These were made by a tinsmith, named Henery Nance, who lived in Oakland. The horses were covered with sheets to keep them from being recognized. The Ku Klux Klan in Grenada was organized by seven prominent citizens in the bank building, in a room directly over a barber shop. It met in the back room of some store, in a deserted house, or in the cemetery. Lights were not allowed." Elaborate regalia was also known in Alabama: "pasteboard funnel hats, long gowns, and red pants with white stripes up and down the seams, with full disguises for the horses as well." Another account of the women's role in creating Klan iconography is the claim by descendants of Cornelia S. Nichols Cliffe that "she was wholeheartedly in sympathy with the Southern cause. It was she who fashioned the first robes used by the Ku Klux Klan in Williamson county."

There are multiple accounts of Klansmen of the era playacting at being ghosts or walking dead bodies, perhaps risen from their graves on a Civil War battlefield to reinforce the racial order with spooky messages. These shows were believed to be convincing performances that the "ignorant, superstitious negroes" took seriously.

In Tennessee, "the most typical activity was the taking of guns from Negroes." In Alabama, whippings were "the default mode of Klan intimidation." In Mississippi, one threatening letter outlined that a vote had been taken about the target and whether or not they were guilty of certain "crimes", and explained that they typically granted their potential victims no more than three days to depart the vicinity. An oral history of slavery taken from Polly Turner Cancer of Marshall County, Mississippi produced by the WPA Slave Narratives project recounts similar stories:

"Atter de war cum de Ku Klux; dey didn't cum to my house 'cause dey was lookin' fur niggers wid guns; all de niggers had bot guns wid de money dey was paid fur workin'; dey jus' wanted dem to hunt rabbits an' sich but de Ku Klux didn't want dem to hav' guns; dey wud hide out in de swamp, but sumhow de Ku Klux knew ever' thing dey did or said; dey mus' had a pilot; dey wud take deir guns away frum dem an' run dem out ov de swamp. De Ku Klux rid on horses an' de men's an' de hosses had on uniforms; dey wud ask fur a 'hole bucket of water an' dey sed dey was de speerits ov de soldiers dat were killed at Shiloh."

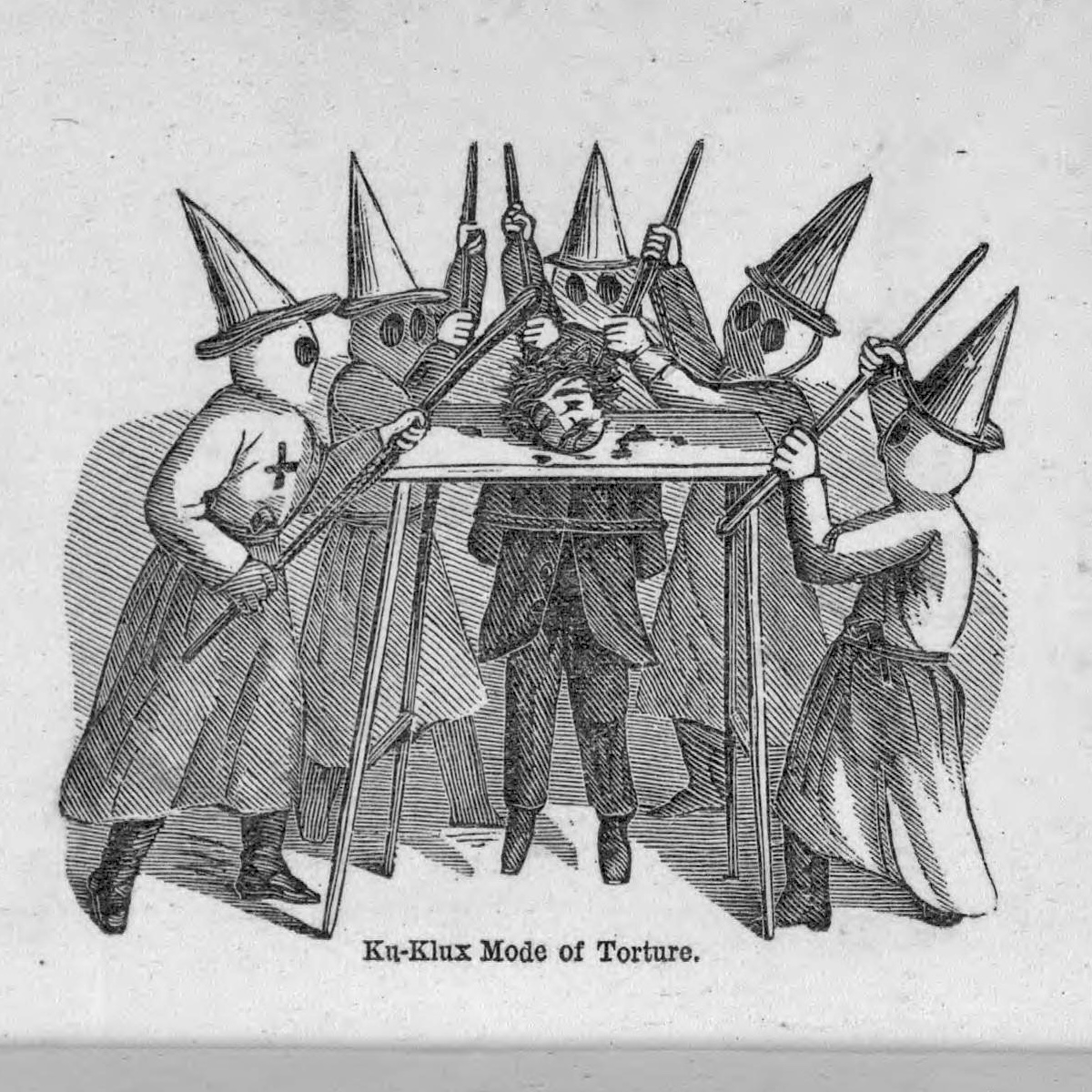
"Ku-Klux Mode of Torture" from Experience of a northern man among the Ku-Klux; or, The condition of the South (1872)

Intimidation of anyone involved in the education of Black Americans was common. For example, "On Saturday night, February 22, [1868] about 20 Ku Klux paraded through Murfreesboro, some lingering around the house of teachers of Negro schools." According to one history, "With almost no exceptions the teachers were resented as 'radicals and social equality propagandists'." Teachers who arrived in more rural areas faced almost total ostracism and no little danger from the Klan and company, "which helps explain why the most successful Negro schools were in larger places such as Charleston and Memphis". Female teachers from the North were typically ignored by the First Klan, although they were often harassed by Southern society generally. Male teachers who did not comply with Klan commands to leave town were often tortured.

The Klan also served to impede free movement of former slaves after the war. Mary Gaffney, interviewed for the WPA Slave Narratives project, recalled "one negro that Mistress sent him to San Antonio for his Maser so he would have horse to ride back. He was riding one horse and leading another, she did not send pass with him as the war was over and the slaves were done declared free and before that negro boy got to where he was going them K K K held him up for his pass and he did'nt have any, so they took him off his horse and beat him up so bad he liked to have died, then they took some rawhide strings, bound his hands and feet around that horse's belly and turned that horse toward home. When he got home he was nearly dead, without anything to eat or drink. They had to take him from that horse and carry him to his quarters and the doctor thought for several days that he was going to die, as inflamation had set up in his legs where he was bruised. An old negro mammy there saved his life by putting his feet in a pan of hot water, boiling that inflamation out of that negroe's legs and he got well. That is what the KKK would do for the negro if he tried to leave his Maser without his Maser say so."

== Historiography ==
The distinction between the First, Second, and Third Klans dates back to the 1960s.

Perhaps moreso than with later Klan organizations, relatives of first-generation Klansmen often claimed association after the fact. For instance, a Childress of Tennessee wrote in 1960, "It was also at Pulaski that my father [John Whitsitt Childress Jr.] became one of the organizers of the original Ku Klux Klan. (For the complete and true story of the Klan, see its history in the Ridley book. This gives the only true history of its beginnings, its operations, and its end, and could have been written only by one who knew the story personally.) I could never get father to admit his membership, for the Federal laws against it were never repealed; but there can be no doubt that he was one of the boys who started the KKK in 1867, when he was living in Pulaski. All Klansmen were young Confederate officers and the original group got together as a club or fraternity for fun only. The later KKK activities were brought about for protection against outrages of the scalawags and carpetbaggers who were exciting the Negroes to crimes."

== See also ==
- Ku Klux Klan § First Klan: 1865–1871
- Nathan Bedford Forrest § Ku Klux Klan leadership
- Thomas P. Bailey § "Racial creed of the Southern people"

== Sources ==
- Alexander, Thomas B. (1949). "Kukluxism in Tennessee, 1865–1869". Tennessee Historical Quarterly. 8 (3): 195–219. ISSN 0040-3261. JSTOR 42621013.
- Brown, Julia C. (1912). "Reconstruction in Yalobusha and Grenada Counties". Publications of the Mississippi Historical Society. XII. University of Mississippi: 214–282.
- Degler, Carl N. (1965). "A Century of the Klans: A Review Article". The Journal of Southern History. 31 (4): 435–443. doi:10.2307/2205342. ISSN 0022-4642. JSTOR 2205342.
- Fitzgerald, M.W. (2017). Reconstruction in Alabama: From Civil War to Redemption in the Cotton South. Baton Rouge: Louisiana State University Press.
- Gorman, Kathleen (1997). ""This Man Felker is a Man of Pretty Good Standing": A Reconstruction Klansman in Walton County". The Georgia Historical Quarterly. 81 (4): 897–914. ISSN 0016-8297. JSTOR 40550188.
- Johnson, Walter (2013). River of Dark Dreams: Slavery and Empire in the Cotton Kingdom. Cambridge: Belknap Press of Harvard University Press. ISBN 9780674074880. LCCN 2012030065. OCLC 827947225. OL 26179618M.
- Randel, William Peirce (1965). The Ku Klux Klan: A Century of Infamy. New York: Chilton Company. LCCN 65013920.
- Stokes, Rebecca Martin (1929). History of Grenada (1830–1880) (Master's thesis). Oxford, Miss.: University of Mississippi. 1972.
- Watkins, Ruth (1912). "Reconstruction in Marshall County". Publications of the Mississippi Historical Society. XII. University of Mississippi: 155–213.
