= Joseph C. Miller =

American historian and academic (1939–2019)

- Born: Joseph Calder Miller; April 30, 1939
- Died: March 12, 2019 (aged 79)
- Occupations: Historian; academic

Academic background
- Education: Wesleyan University (BA); Northwestern University (MBA); University of Wisconsin–Madison (MA, PhD)

Joseph Calder Miller (April 30, 1939 – March 12, 2019) was an American historian and academic. He served at the University of Virginia from 1972 to 2014 as T. Cary Johnson Jr. professor of history, and was a fellow of the American Academy of Arts and Sciences. As a historian, Joseph wrote extensively on the early history of Africa, especially Angola, the Atlantic slave trade, women and slavery, child slavery, Atlantic history, and world history.

== Biography ==
Miller received his Bachelor of Arts at Wesleyan University in 1961 and a Master of Business Administration at Northwestern University in 1963. He attended graduate school in the Program in Comparative Tropical History at the University of Wisconsin–Madison, where he studied with Jan Vansina. He received a Master of Arts in 1967 and a Doctor of Philosophy in history in 1972.

His most important book was Way of Death: Merchant Capitalism and the Angolan Slave Trade, 1730-1830, which won the Herskovits Prize of the African Studies Association in 1989. In an article shortly before his death, he described his scholarship as stemming from

a commitment to bringing Africans respectfully into the mainstream of the history they share with the rest of us, and us with them. Over the years, that’s extended to an effort to understand the experiences of enslavement on global scales – again, painting the larger picture, into which fit the Africans brought to the Americas. On a world scale, they were far from alone, and the seemingly unstoppable removals of people that enslavement means in turn tell us something about ourselves that we’d all be better off recognizing.

In addition to his monographs, Miller was a prolific editor. He was an editor for the Journal of African History from 1990 to 1997 and edited multiple volumes each of the Encyclopedia of Africa South of the Sahara, the Macmillan Encyclopedia of World Slavery, and the New Encyclopedia of Africa. He also edited the 2015 Princeton Companion to Atlantic History and contributed entries on the Transatlantic Slave Trade to the Encyclopedia Virginia in 2018. He is sometimes confused with the Joe C. Miller who wrote Never A Fight of Woman Against Man: What Textbooks Don't Say about Women's Suffrage, (published in The History Teacher, Vol. 48, No. 3, May 2015); that Joe C. Miller's works can be seen at AlternativeSuffrage.com.

Miller was treasurer of the African Studies Association from 1989 to 1993 and served as president of that organization in 2005 and 2006. He was president of the American Historical Association in 1998. In 2004 he received a Guggenheim Fellowship to study the world history of slavery. He was inducted into the American Academy of Arts and Sciences in 2018, shortly before his death from cancer.

If a historical understanding of change teaches one lesson about life, it would be humility, with a strong overtone of irony.

== Works ==
- The African Past Speaks: Essays on Oral Tradition and History, Folkestone, England: Dawson; Hamden, CT: Archon, 1980, ISBN 978-0-208-01784-0
- Way of Death: Merchant Capitalism and the Angolan Slave Trade, 1730–1830, Madison, WI: University of Wisconsin Press, 1988, ISBN 978-0-299-11560-9
- Equatorial Africa, Washington, DC: American Historical Association, 1976, ISBN 978-0-87229-021-1
- Kings and Kinsmen: Early Mbundu States in Angola, Oxford, England: Clarendon Press, 1976, ISBN 978-0-19-822704-5
- Slavery: A Worldwide Bibliography, 1900–1982, White Plains, NY: Kraus, 1985, ISBN 978-0-527-63659-3
- Slavery and Slaving in World History: A Bibliography, Volume I, 1900-1991: Millwood, NY: Kraus International Publications, 1993, ISBN 0-527-63660-6
- Slavery and Slaving in World History: A Bibliography, Volume II, 1992-1996: Armonk, NY: M.E. Sharpe, Inc., 1999, ISBN 0-765-60279-2
- New Encyclopedia of Africa, with John Middleton, Detroit MI: Thomson/Gale, 2008, ISBN 978-0-684-31454-9
- Macmillan Encyclopedia of World Slavery, with Paul Finkelman, New York, NY: Macmillan, 1998, ISBN 978-0-02-864607-7
- Women and Slavery, with Gwyn Campbell and Suzanne Miers, Athens OH: Ohio University Press, 2008, ISBN 978-0-8214-1723-2
- History and Africa/Africa and History, AHA Presidential Address, Washington, DC, January 8, 1999, published in The American Historical Review, Vol. 104, No. 1. (Feb., 1999), pp. 1–32
