= List of abolitionist periodicals published in North America =

This is a list of abolitionist newspapers in the United States, published between 1776 and 1865. These publications, most of which were short-lived and had limited circulation, existed to share information that promoted the decline and fall of American slavery. This list is focused on newspapers whose predominant interest was the abolition of slavery, rather than any American newspaper that held a generally anti-slavery editorial position.

Abolitionist newspapers and magazines (U.S.)
Title	Dates	Location	Notable editors	Online editions
The Anti-Slavery Bugle	1845–1861	Lisbon, Ohio	James Barnaby, Oliver Johnson	LOC, Newspapers.com
The Colored American	1837-1842	New York, New York	Samuel Cornish, Phillip Alexander Bell, Charles Bennett Ray	
The Free South	1859	Newport, Kentucky	William S. Bailey	
Genius of Universal Emancipation	1829–1839	Various	Benjamin Lundy	HathiTrust * Google Books
Herald of Freedom	1835–1846	Concord, New Hampshire	Nathaniel Peabody Rogers	
The Herald of Freedom	1851–1855	Wilmington, Ohio	John W. Chaffin	Newspapers.com
The Liberator	1831–1865	Boston, Massachusetts	William Lloyd Garrison, Isaac Knapp	Digital Commonwealth (Garrison's copy) * Newspapers.com
National Anti-Slavery Standard	1840–1870	Philadelphia, New York City	Lydia Maria Child, David Lee Child	Newspapers.com (1840–1852)
The National Era	1847–1860	Washington, D.C.		
The North Star	1847–1851	Rochester, New York	Frederick Douglass	Library of Congress
The Philanthropist	1836–1843	Cincinnati, Ohio	James Birney	
The Signal of Liberty	1841–1848	Ann Arbor, Michigan		

== See also ==
- Category:Abolitionist newspapers published in the United States
- List of publications of William Garrison and Isaac Knapp
- Historiography of the United States § Slavery and Black history
- List of bibliographies on American history
- Bibliography of slavery in the United States
