= Slavery and Slaving in World History: A Bibliography =

1993/1999 bibliography of books on slavery

Slavery and Slaving in World History: A Bibliography, compiled by historian Joseph C. Miller, is a two-volume bibliography of books and scholarly articles focusing on slavery worldwide through the end of the 20th century. The first volume, published in 1993, covers more than 10,000 secondary sources from the years 1900–1991. Its companion volume, published in 1999, includes an additional 4,000 works from 1992 to 1996.

Miller's bibliography, which has been described as "the most comprehensive of its kind", was updated initially through annual supplements in Slavery and Abolition, a journal of slavery and post-slave studies. The listing is now maintained online through the University of Virginia's The Bibliography of Slavery and World Slaving.

Both volumes are organized into sections on comparative studies; geographical regions, such as North America, Spanish Mainland, Caribbean, Africa, and Asia; and historical periods, including Ancient History and Medieval/Early Modern Europe. An additional section devoted to the Slave Trade is organized by similar categories.

Miller, who was T. Cary Johnson Jr. professor of history at the University of Virginia from 1972 to 2014, wrote extensively on the early history of Africa, the Atlantic slave trade, and related subjects. His biblilograpy on worldwide slavery brought together two earlier works: Slavery: A Comparative Teaching Bibliography, and Slavery: A Worldwide Bibliography, 1900–1982.

== See also ==
- Bibliography of slavery in the United States
