= Jeffrey Kerr-Ritchie =

British historian

Jeffrey R. Kerr-Ritchie
- Born: Jeffrey R. Kerr-Ritchie; 1960; London, United Kingdom
- Occupation: Historian

Jeffrey R. Kerr-Ritchie (born 1960) is a British historian and professor at Howard University in Washington, D.C.

== Education ==
Born in London, Kerr-Ritchie was educated at Kingston University in England, and the University of Pennsylvania in Philadelphia, United States.

== Career ==
He has taught at Wesleyan University, University of Pennsylvania, Columbia University, Binghamton University, and the University of North Carolina at Greensboro. He has been at Howard University since 2006.

== Awards ==
Kerr-Ritchie has been a Fellow at Fulbright-Hays UK, the Schomburg Center in New York, and the National Humanities Center in North Carolina.

== Publications ==
His first book, Freedpeople in the Tobacco South, Virginia 1860-1900, expands the traditional periodization of US Reconstruction to argue for the making of a black peasantry as a consequence of transformations in the global tobacco economy. His second, Rites of August First: Emancipation Day in the Black Atlantic World, examines commemorations of British colonial abolition and how these served as sites of anti-US slavery mobilization in the English-speaking Atlantic between the 1830s and 1860s. The third, Freedom’s Seekers: Essays on Comparative Emancipation, offers a broad transnational focus of experiences and lives challenging nation-centered histories that usually end up reifying exceptional narratives of emancipation. The fourth book, Rebellious Passage: The Creole Revolt and America’s Coastal Slave Trade, provides the first scholarly examination of the US maritime slave trade and a successful slave ship revolt in 1841 with international ramifications.

== Books ==
- Kerr-Ritchie, Jeffery R., Freedpeople in the Tobacco South, Virginia 1860-1900. Baton Rouge, Louisiana State University Press, 1999, ISBN 0-8078-4763-1
- Kerr-Ritchie, Jeffery R., Rites of August First: Emancipation Day in the Black Atlantic World. Baton Rouge, Louisiana State University Press, 2007, ISBN 978-0-8071-3232-6
- Kerr-Ritchie, Jeffery R., Freedom’s Seekers: Essays on Comparative Emancipation. Baton Rouge, Louisiana State University Press, 2014. ISBN 978-0-8071-5471-7
- Kerr-Ritchie, Jeffery R., Rebellious Passage: The Creole Revolt and America’s Coastal Slave Trade. New York: Cambridge University Press, 2019. ISBN 978-1-108-70000-9
