= Thomas P. Bailey =

Southern American educator and racialist (1867–1949)

Thomas Pearce Bailey (1867–1949) was an American educator and early twentieth-century race theorist. He was born August 18, 1867, in Georgetown, South Carolina. During his lifetime he was a professor of various subjects including education, psychology, and ethology. Bailey published a number of works on ethology and child development, but is best known for his writing on race and race relations in the south. He died in Winter Park, Florida, on February 7, 1949.

In the words of C. Vann Woodward, Bailey's essay "Race Orthodoxy in the South" (published 1913 in Neale's Monthly and reprinted as part of a collection in 1914) "set down this 'racial creed of the Southern people' with such candor and accuracy that it may serve as the best available summary". Writing in 1915, reviewer R. H. Dabney noted that Bailey was opposed to racial equality because it would result in "inter-marriage" and "endanger the peace of the community." Dabney also noted that Bailey was unable to reconcile his stated belief in the "immeasurable worth of each human soul" and his beliefs about race.

Bailey was an avowed racist who believed in biological differences between races. He criticized Harriet Beecher Stowe for failing to recognize the importance of these alleged biological distinctions between races and treating them as mere differences of class. Bailey said, "No one has come within shouting distance of the real Negro problem who does not appreciate this distinction. Indeed, almost everything critical that can be alleged against Uncle Tom's Cabin springs from the failure of its humanitarian author to sympathize with race consciousness as such".

== "Racial creed of the Southern people" ==
In his collection of writings, Race Orthodoxy in the South and Other Aspects of the Negro Question, Bailey wrote,

"Here is the racial creed of the Southern people as expressed by a group of representative Southerners during the past few months:

1. "Blood will tell."
2. The white race must dominate.
3. The Teutonic peoples stand for race purity.
4. The negro is inferior and will remain so.
5. "This is a white man's country."
6. No social equality.
7. No political equality.
8. In matters of civil rights and legal adjustments give the white man, as opposed to the colored man, the benefit of the doubt; and under no circumstances interfere with the prestige of the white race.
9. In educational policy let the negro have the crumbs that fall from the white man's table.
10. Let there be such industrial education of the negro as will best fit him to serve the white man.
11. Only Southerners understand the negro question.
12. Let the South settle the negro question.
13. The status of peasantry is all the negro may hope for, if the races are to live together in peace.
14. Let the lowest white man count for more than the highest negro.
15. The above statements indicate the leadings of Providence."
