= Slave-Trading in the Old South =

1931 U.S. history book

- Author: Frederic Bancroft
- Published: 1931
- Publisher: J.H. Fürst Co., Baltimore
- Pages: 415
- OCLC: 426282
- Dewey Decimal: 326.10975
- LC Class: E442 .B21

Slave-Trading in the Old South by Frederic Bancroft, an independently wealthy freelance historian, is a classic history of the domestic slave trade in the antebellum United States. Among other things, Bancroft discredited the assertions, then common in Ulrich B. Phillips-influenced histories, that slave traders were reviled outcasts and that slave trading was a rare exigency. Bancroft's book "provides still unrivaled profiles of great numbers of traders, many of whom he found to have the highest social standing."

The comprehensiveness of his scholarly attack on the "benevolent paternalism" theory of slavery was such that, per the Journal of Negro History book review in April 1931, "It will be necessary [for slavery apologists] to work out another program to cover up the truth for another fifty years." Henry Steele Commager wrote that it was "a contribution not only to the history of slavery, but to the history of Southern society and psychology, of lasting importance." William Allen White wrote "a curious and terrible book is this...a scholarly piece of work, documented carefully and written with some sense of historical perspective." Broadus Mitchell wrote "He knocks all the props from under the sentimentalists...The book is as packed with human interest as any you will find, and is quite as surely packed with thorough scholarship."

Bancroft was one of the first historians to use first-person testimony from former slaves, and he also corresponded with former slave traders or their families and collected their memories of the slave business in America. Some footnotes from Slave-Trading show that this research could not be conducted today:

Apart from what the advts. show, the statements as to the locations etc. are based on the recollections of two residents of that time. The father of one of them in 1859-60 kept a store and bakery next door to the Brown pen, when it was in the middle of the block and on the north side of Market st.

Capt. J. Thompson Brown of the Confederate artillery, for nearly half a century a very successful real estate agent and auctioneer in Richmond, remembered 15 of these traders, 4 of the private jailors and 9 of the auctioneers. "I return the list [from the Directory for 1852] you sent me with [my] (X) cross-mark opposite the names of those I personally knew were 'nigger-traders', as they were called by the vulgar...'fo' de war'. I personally knew...Ed. D. Eacho, Newton M. Lee, E. A. J. Clopton and others." —Letter of July 30, 1917, to the author.

Bancroft's book thus became a "definitive study of the domestic slave trade" for decades. The book has a recognizable quality of "moral outrage" but "the evidence he presents has stood the test of time...research that followed has confirmed many of his points." Contemporary researchers continue to draw on Bancroft's work: a journalist-turned-local historian studying newspaper coverage of slavery in East Tennessee wrote in 2022 that while doing his research, "I bought several books on slavery, the best of which was one titled Slave Trading and the Old South [sic], printed in 1931."

Slave Trading in the Old South was reprinted in 1959 by Ungar, with an introduction by Allan Nevins, and again in 1996, by the University of South Carolina Press, with an introduction by Michael Tadman. According to historian Jacob E. Cooke in 1959, other unpublished Bancroft manuscripts on the history of American slavery "can stand comparison, not disadvantageously, with any history of the South yet published." The Frederic Bancroft papers are held in the Columbia University Libraries.

== Legacy and historiography ==
Although Slave-Trading in the Old South was published in 1931, contemporary scholars continue to consider it one of the seminal works in the study of the domestic slave trade in the United States. Much subsequent scholarship, including that of Michael Tadman, Steven Dale, Joshua Rothman, and Alexandra Finley, has expanded on Bancroft's original findings or corroborated them with new data. The book also played a significant role in shifting the historiographical focus away from pro-slavery narratives toward a systematic examination of the slave trade and its economic role in the American South.

== Uses of the book by contemporary scholars ==
The book continues to be cited as a reference source in studies of the internal slave trade. Contemporary scholars in the fields of economic history, social history, and slavery studies have repeatedly used the data and documentation collected by Bancroft, and have considered it the starting point for much new research on slave markets, merchant networks, and forced slave movement.

== Chapter titles ==
I. Some Phases of the Background

II. Early Domestic Slave-Trading

III. The District of Columbia: "The Very Seat and Center"

IV. The Importance of Slave-Rearing

V. Virginia and the Richmond Market

VI. Here and There in Maryland, Kentucky, and Missouri

VII. Slave-Hiring

VIII. The Height of the Slave Trade in Charleston

IX. Dividing Families and Selling Children Separately—Restrictions.

X. Savannah's Leading Trader and His Largest Sale

XI. Minor Trading in the Carolinas, Georgia, and Tennessee

XII. Memphis: The Boltons, the Forrests, and Others

XIII. Various Features of the Interstate Trade

XIV. Some Alabama and Mississippi Markets

XV. New Orleans, the Mistress of Trade

XVI. High Prices and "The Negro-Fever"

XVII. The Status of Slave-Trading

XVIII. Estimates as to Numbers, Transactions and Value

== See also ==
- Bibliography of the slave trade in the United States
- George Washington Williams – American soldier, minister, politician, lawyer, journalist and historian (1849–1891)
