= Frederic Bancroft =

American historian (1860-1945)

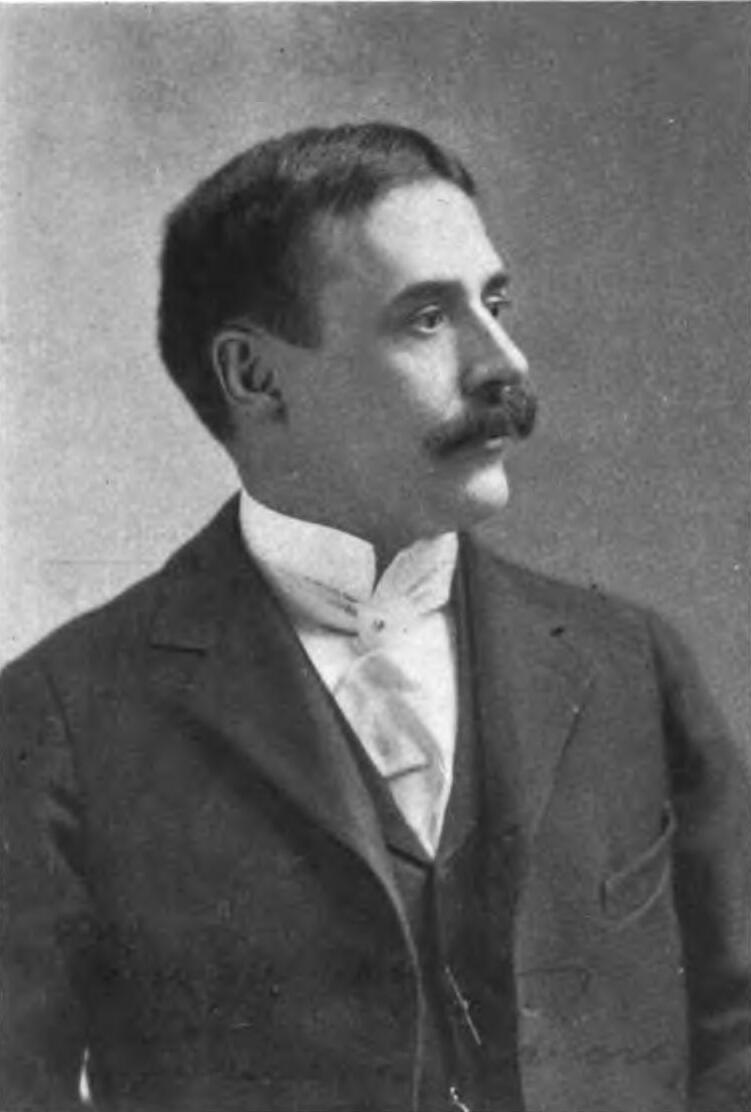
- Born: 30 October 1860; Galesburg
- Died: 22 February 1945 (aged 84); Washington, D.C.
- Alma mater: Amherst College; Columbia University
- Occupation: Historian, librarian, philanthropist

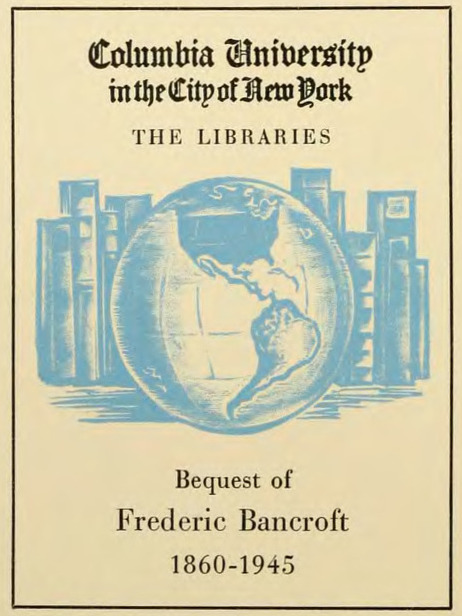
Bookplate of bequest of Frederic Bancroft to Columbia University Library, New York City

Frederic Bancroft (October 30, 1860 – February 22, 1945) was an American historian, author, and librarian. The Bancroft Prize, one of the most distinguished academic awards in the field of history, was established at Columbia University in his memory and that of his brother, Edgar Bancroft.

== Biography ==
Bancroft was born in Galesburg, Illinois, and graduated with an A.B. from Amherst College and a PhD from Columbia University. He was a lecturer for one year at Columbia, and served as librarian of the State Department from 1888 to 1892.

Bancroft was an active member of the American Historical Association, and was the unofficial leader of a group from 1913–1915 that called for the reform of the organization's election procedures, ultimately securing such reforms at the 1915 meeting although failing to topple what he viewed as the oligarchy led by J. Franklin Jameson.

Bancroft was the author of two well-regarded books on the South, Slave Trading in the Old South in 1931 and A Sketch of the Negro in Politics, Especially in South Carolina and Mississippi in 1885. In 1900, he also wrote a biography of William H. Seward.

Through his bequest, in 1948 the Bancroft Prize was established at Columbia University in his memory and that of his brother, diplomat and attorney Edgar Bancroft. It is considered one of the most distinguished academic awards in the field of history.
