= List of Maryland and Delaware slave traders =

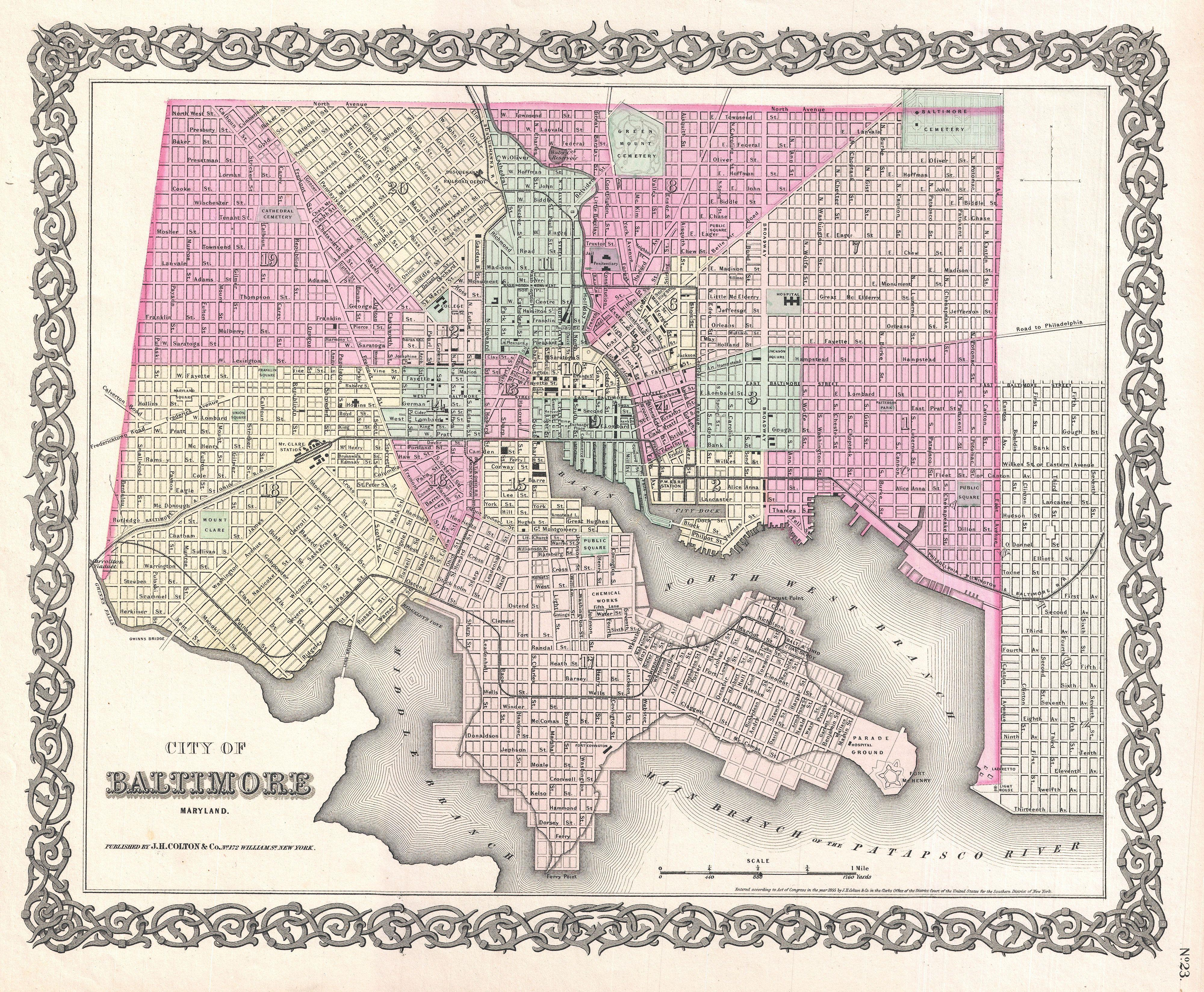
1855 Colton map of Baltimore (Geographicus Rare Antique Maps)

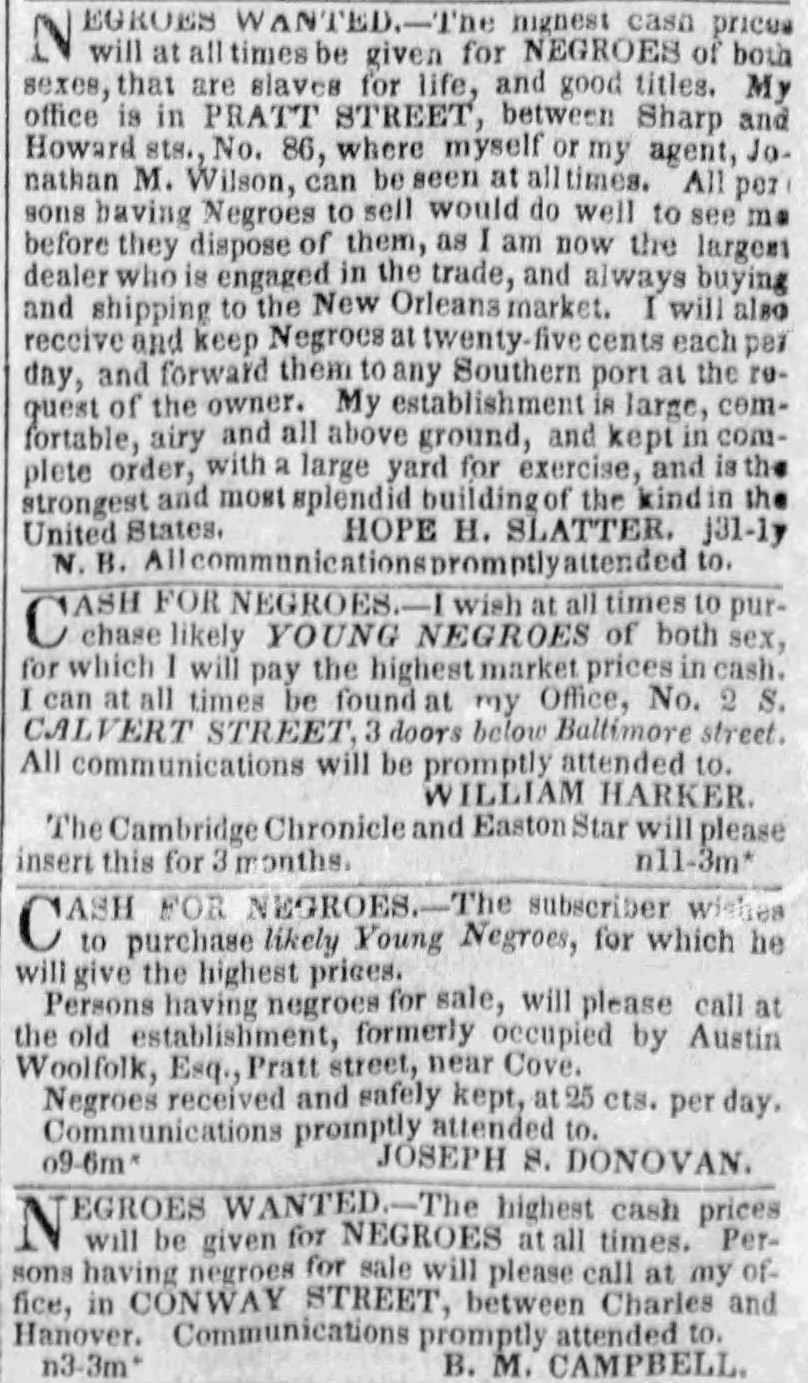
"NEGROES WANTED" and "CASH FOR NEGROES" ads placed by Hope H. Slatter, Joseph S. Donovan, B. M. Campbell, and William Harker (The Baltimore Sun, Nov. 14, 1843)

This is a list of slave traders working in Maryland and Delaware from 1776 until 1865:

- G. T. Allen
- David Anderson, Kentucky and Baltimore (?)
- John Blackwell, Bladensburg
- Joseph Bush, Salisbury, Md.
- Bernard M. Campbell, Walter L. Campbell, and relations, Baltimore and New Orleans,
- Col. Benjamin Chambers, Baltimore
- George Davis, Maryland
- Jeff Davis, kidnapper, Maryland and Florida
- John N. Denning, Baltimore
- Charles Dickinson, Maryland, Tennessee, and Louisiana
- Jilson Dove, Washington, D.C. and Montgomery County, Maryland
- Joseph S. Donovan, Baltimore
- Green Harris Duke, Baltimore (as G. H. Duke with J. M. Wilson), Frederick, Md. and Georgia (affiliate of Theophilus Freeman of Georgia)
- Henry Fairbanks, Baltimore
- Mass or Marsa or Marcy Fountain, Delaware, and Caroline County, and Queen Anne County, Md.
- Mr. Fry, Delaware
- Samuel Galloway III, Chestertown and Annapolis
- John Gooding, Baltimore, importing from Africa to Cuba
- Henry Gordon, Maryland and Mississippi
- James Green, Newport, Maryland, and Washington, D.C.
- E. Guyton, Baltimore
- William Harker, Baltimore and Dorchester, Md.
- O. C. and S. Y. Harris, Upper Marlboro, Md.
- Octavius Harris, Calvert County

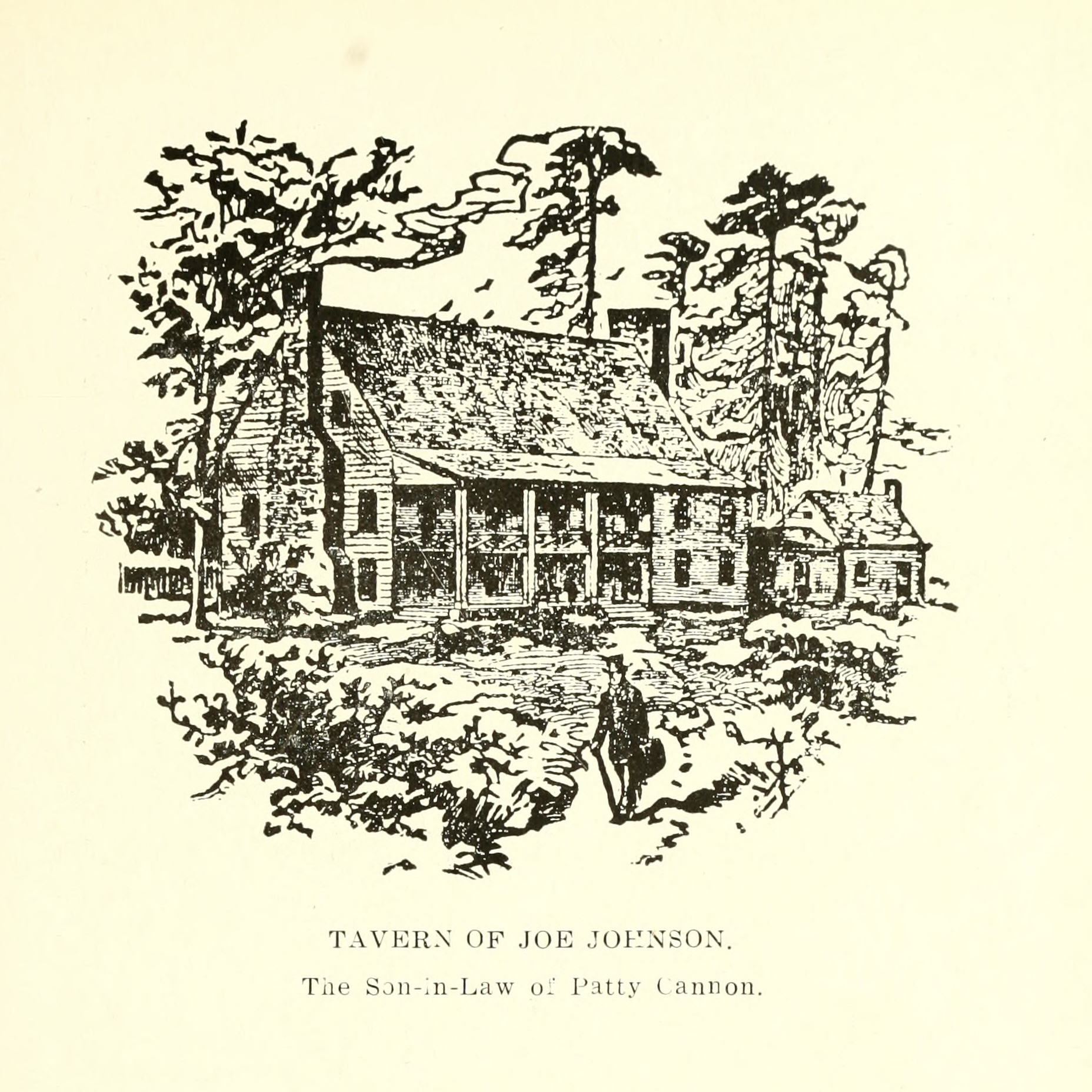
Tavern of slave trader Joe Johnson, the son-in-law of serial killer Patty Cannon

- Joseph Johnson, Ebenezer Johnson & Patty Cannon, Northwest Fork Hundred, Delaware
- A. E. Jones, Talbott County, Md.
- Stephen Jones, Delaware and Maryland
- Legg & Williams, Annapolis, Md.
- F. McCann, Hagerstown, Md.
- George Kephart, Maryland, Virginia, District of Columbia
- William B. Petit
- Capt. Poll, Talbott County, Md. and North Carolina
- James Franklin Purvis (and Isaac F. Purvis), Baltimore
- David Rees, Attapakas, Louisiana, and Maryland
- Joel Rimes, Maryland and Alabama
- Thomas Ringgold, Chestertown
- Roberson, Maryland and South Carolina
- Lemuel Sappington
- Lewis Scott, Baltimore
- Henry F. Slatter, Baltimore and New Orleans
- Hope H. Slatter, Baltimore
- Jack Willison, Maryland and Alabama
- Mr. Thompson, Baltimore and the lands of the Cherokee nation
- J. M. Wilson, Baltimore and New Orleans
- Lewis Winters, Baltimore
- Austin Woolfolk, Baltimore
- Joseph B. Woolfolk, Eastern Shore, Maryland, and Natchez
- Samuel Martin Woolfolk, Baltimore, New Orleans, and Natchez
- C. A. Yeats, Port Tobacco, Md.

== See also ==
- History of slavery in Maryland
- History of slavery in Delaware
- List of District of Columbia slave traders
- List of slave traders of the United States

== Sources ==
- Bancroft, Frederic (2023) [1931]. Slave Trading in the Old South. Southern Classics Series. University of South Carolina Press. ISBN 978-1-64336-427-8.
- Calderhead, William (1977). "The Role of the Professional Slave Trader in a Slave Economy: Austin Woolfolk, A Case Study". Civil War History. 23 (3): 195–211. doi:10.1353/cwh.1977.0041. ISSN 1533-6271. S2CID 143907436.
- Jay, William (1844). A View of the Action of the Federal Government, In Behalf of Slavery. Utica, N.Y.: J.C. Jackson.
- Roberts, Kevin D. (2003). Slaves and Slavery in Louisiana: The Evolution of Atlantic World Identities, 1791–1831 (PhD thesis). University of Texas at Austin.
- Schermerhorn, Calvin (2016). "Chapter 10. The Coastwise Slave Trade and a Mercantile Community of Interest". In Rockman, Seth Edward; Beckert, Sven (eds.). Slavery's Capitalism: A New History of American Economic Development. Early American Studies. Philadelphia: University of Pennsylvania Press. pp. 209–224. doi:10.9783/9780812293098-011. ISBN 978-0-8122-4841-8. JSTOR j.ctt1dfnrs7. LCCN 2016304619. OCLC 945028802.
- Smith, Julia Floyd (2017) [1973]. Slavery and Plantation Growth in Antebellum Florida, 1821–1860 (PDF). Florida and the Caribbean Open Books Series (Digital reissue, cc-by-nc-sa ed.). Gainesville, Florida: University of Florida Press. ISBN 978-1-947372-63-4. LCCN 70150656. OCLC 488144. OL 5704889M.
- Stowe, Harriet Beecher (1853). A key to Uncle Tom's cabin: presenting the original facts and documents upon which the story is founded. Boston: J. P. Jewett & Co. LCCN 02004230. OCLC 317690900. OL 21879838M.
- Weld, Theodore Dwight; Grimké, Angelina; Grimké, Sarah Moore (1839). American Slavery As It Is: Testimony of a Thousand Witnesses. New York: American Anti-Slavery Society. LCCN 11008377. OCLC 14906369. OL 20509019M. This article incorporates text from this source, which is in the public domain.
- Williams, Jennie K. (April 2, 2020). "Trouble the water: The Baltimore to New Orleans coastwise slave trade, 1820–1860". Slavery & Abolition. 41 (2): 275–303. doi:10.1080/0144039X.2019.1660509. ISSN 0144-039X. S2CID 203494471.
