= Slatter =

Slatter is a surname. Notable people with the surname include:

- Angela Slatter (born 1967), Australian writer
- Heber Slatter (1887–1918), British footballer
- Helen Slatter (born 1970), British swimmer
- Henry F. Slatter (1817–1849), American slave trader
- Hope H. Slatter (1790–1853), American slave trader
- Hope H. Slatter II (1841–after 1900), American convict
- Kate Slatter (born 1971), Australian rower
- Leonard Slatter (1894-1961), British / South African air marshal
- Les Slatter (1931-2023), English professional footballer
- Neil Slatter (born 1964), Welsh footballer
- Shadrack F. Slatter (1798–1861), American slave trader
- Tim Slatter, rugby league footballer of the 1980s
