= Joseph S. Donovan =

American slave trader (1800–1861)

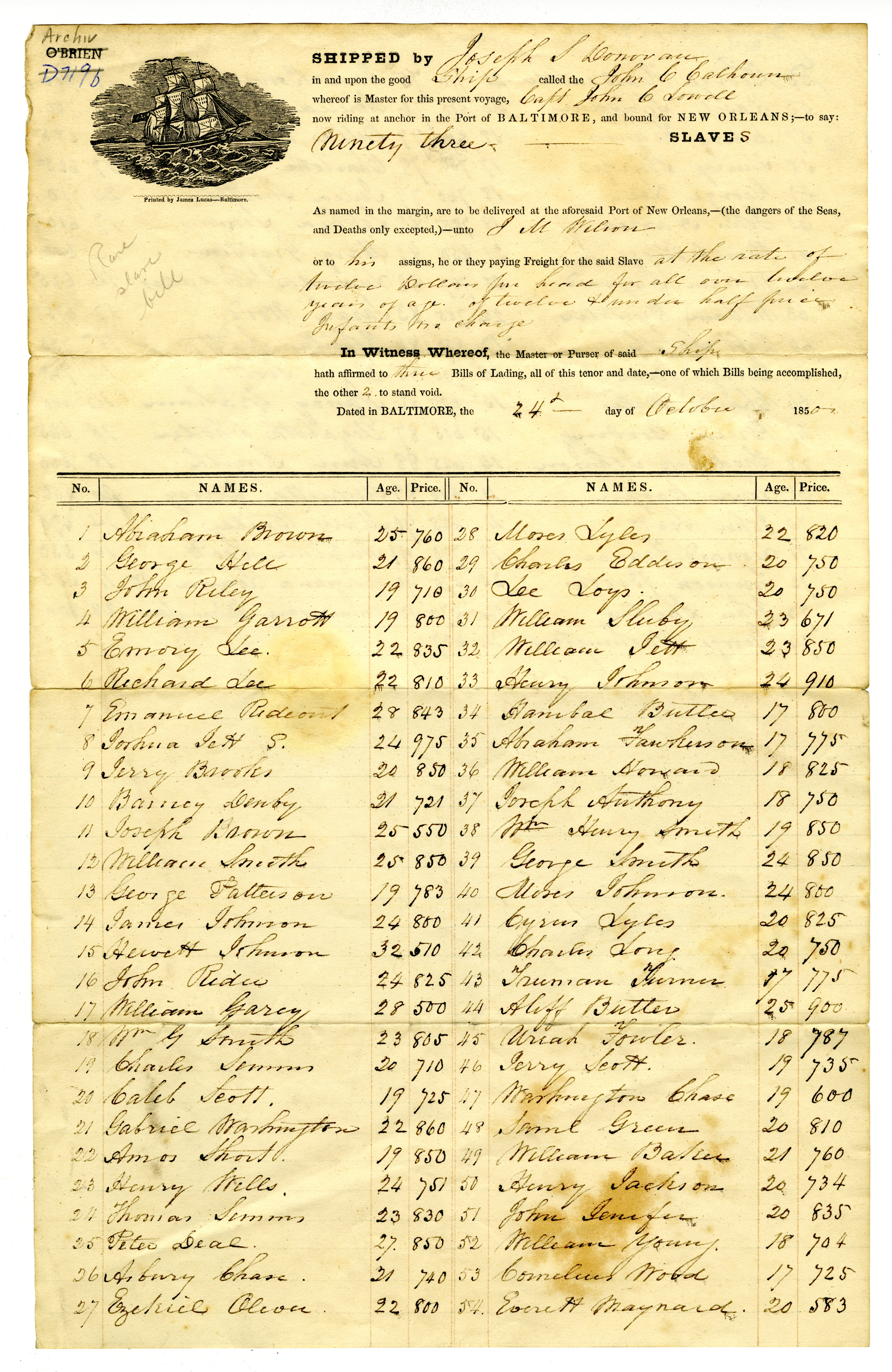
- Joseph S. Donovan shipped 93 people from Baltimore to J. M. Wilson in New Orleans on the John C. Calhoun in October 1850; the ship's owner charged Donovan $12 to send slaves over 12, $6 each for children under 12 years old, "infants no charge" (University of Maine Digital Commons)
- Born: April 20, 1800; Baltimore, Maryland, U.S.
- Died: April 15, 1861 (aged 60); Baltimore, Maryland, U.S.
- Resting place: Green Mount Cemetery
- Other name: J. S. Donovan
- Occupations: Slave trader, slave jailor

Joseph S. Donovan (April 20, 1800 – April 15, 1861) was an American slave trader known for his slave jails in Baltimore, Maryland, United States. Donovan was a major participant in the interregional slave trade, building shipments of enslaved people from the Upper South and delivering them to the Deep South where they would be used, for the most part, on cotton and sugar plantations. As one Baltimore historical researcher and tour guide summarized, "the change from raising tobacco to wheat in the region caused a surplus of labor, whereas the South needed more labor due to the invention of the cotton gin". Donovan, Austin Woolfolk, Bernard M. Campbell, and Hope H. Slatter, have been described as "tycoons of the slave trade" in the Upper South, "responsible for the forced departures of approximately 9,000 captives from Baltimore to New Orleans."

== Biography ==
Records of Donovan's early life are spare but based on census and death records he was born in Baltimore, Maryland, in 1800. It is possible he started out as what was called a tavern trader, as he is known to have operated a tavern called Vauxhall Garden.

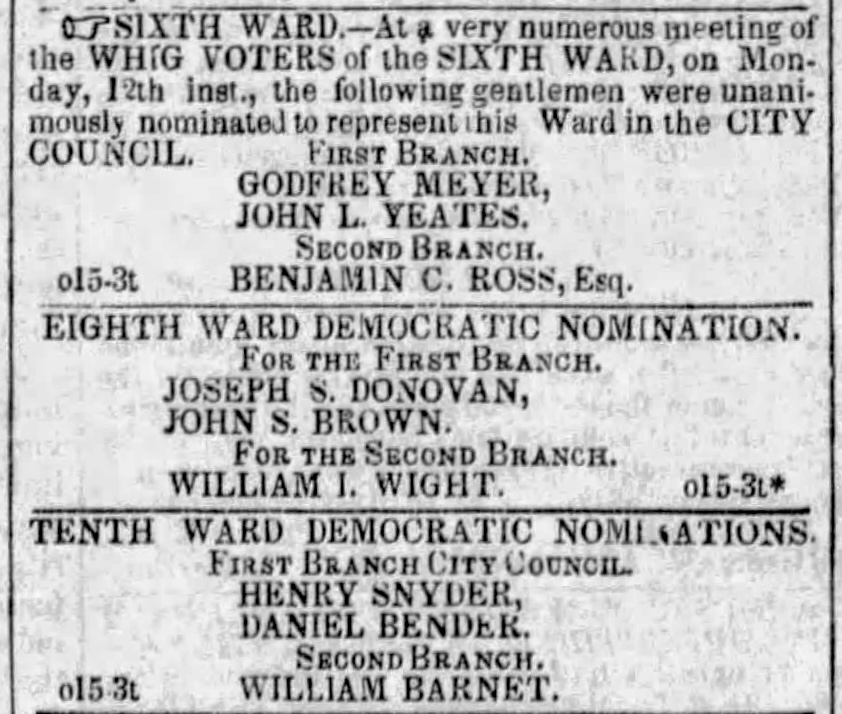
Donovan was briefly involved in local politics; Eighth Ward Democratic nominations, 1840

As a landed, literate, adult white male, Donovan was permitted to participate in American democratic processes of that time and was briefly involved in local politics: In 1840, Donovan was a member to the First Branch City Council of Baltimore, elected from the eighth ward. In 1844 he placed a "cash for Negroes" add in the newspaper and described his premises as the former jail of Austin Woolfolk. He also placed a runaway slave ad seeking the return of 32-year-old Sarah Green, who had recently been purchased near Annapolis and whose mother, Hanna Green, lived on Strawberry Alley near Caroline Meeting House. In summer 1845, a man named Airheart Winter was Donovan's "agent for the purchase of Negroes in Carroll County." Another man named Lucius Winters also worked as a trading agent for Joseph S. Donovan in 1847.

According to historian Jonathan Pritchett, between 1845 and 1847, Donovan made eight coastwise slave shipments to New Orleans, totaling 395 people. In 1848, the Edmondson sisters were shipped to New Orleans; the manifest listed Donovan as the shipper although they were legally titled to Joseph Bruin and another trader called Hill. In 1849, a farmer named William Henry Warfield sold two recaptured runaway slaves named Big Sam and Little Sam to Donovan for $850 with a caveat that Warfield could change his mind within five days; Warfield and the Sams worked out a limited-term indenture agreement, and Warfield took them back from Donovan. An enslaved man died of cholera in Donovan's pen in May 1849.

A 1849 report in the New-York Tribune offers a glimpse of Donovan's trading practices and network at that time:

"A week ago last Monday morning I took the cars at Baltimore for Washington. While standing on the platform where passengers step into the ears, Rev. John F. Cook of this City, came up and entered into conversation with me. he had been to Baltimore to preach the day before. While talking we advanced a few steps, which brought us opposite the Jim Crow car, in which were seated a clerk or runner from Donovan's slave-pen, with five slaves, a young man and woman, the exact picture of despondency and desolation, and three children, who seemed satisfied with the novelty of the scene about them. These slaves were on their way to Alexandria, to be sent thence overland, by Bruin & Hill, to the far Southern market."—"Slavery in the District" Anti-Slavery Bugle, July 6, 1849

=== 1850s ===
At the time of the 1850 U.S. census, Joseph S. Donovan reported that his occupation was trading, and that the real estate he owned was worth US$8,000 (equivalent to $309,600 in 2025) In 1850, following the abolition of the slave trade in Washington, D.C., a man who lived in New Orleans requested that several slaves he owned who lived in D.C. be shipped down to him. The slave trader sent to collect these people for shipment was Joseph S. Donovan, and the people were the wife, daughters and grandchildren of a White House coachman named William Williams. Williams was understandably distraught, and U.S. President Millard Fillmore reportedly paid for Williams to visit Donovan's slave jail before they were shipped south. Upon arriving at Baltimore, Williams was informed he could buy back his family for $3,200. Funds were apparently raised from the likes of Fillmore, Daniel Webster, Winfield Scott, William Corcoran, Georgiana Patterson, Sophia Towson, and William Bliss. White House Historical Association scholar Pamela Scott found a receipt from Donovan for Williams, dated August 13, 1850, in the amount of $1,850, for Williams' wife Dolly, daughter Maria, daughter Susan Johnson, and Susan's three children, who were between three and six years old.

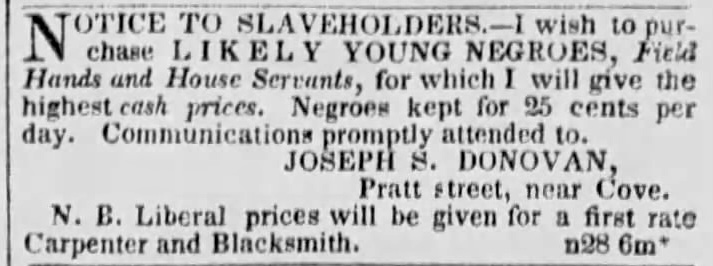
"Notice to Slaveholders" The Baltimore Sun, November 30, 1844

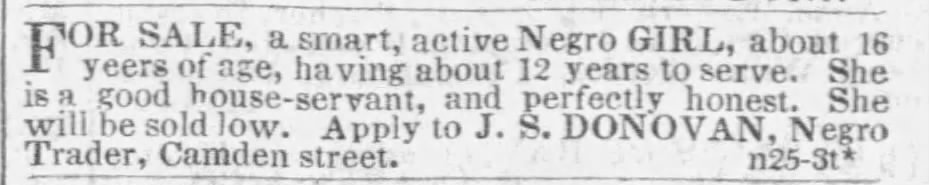
"For sale" The Baltimore Sun, November 25, 1847

In 1851, the newly passed Fugitive Slave Act was used to recapture James Hamlet, a self-emancipated man who had been living free in New York City. Upon his forced return to Maryland, Hamlet was promptly sold to Donovan and deposited in his slave jail.

According to Frederic Bancroft in Slave-Trading in the Old South, "Joseph S. Donovan, who appealed to slaveholders for 500 negroes, put special stress on the facts that his office and yard adjoined the Baltimore and Ohio station and were close to the steamboat landings; and, later, that he had built a secure jail where he would 'receive negroes for safe-keeping, at the southwest corner of Eutaw and Camden streets, opposite' the west side of that station. Extant manifests tell of his shipments of 144 slaves from Baltimore to New Orleans between April 3, 1851, and December 2, 1852. Publicity, convenience and safety were winning features." In 1853, Donovan was part of a committee advocating for a rail line down Camden to connect with B&O Railroad line. Down south, in 1857, his sometime trading partner J. M. Wilson was advertising "Maryland and Virginia negroes" available at his establishment near the corner of Chartres and Moreau in New Orleans. Donovan moved to his final trading location, at Eutaw and Camden, in 1858. Thirty years later, a former slave trader named Jack Campbell recalled to a newspaper reporter that several enslaved men he had once stored in a slave jail at that location had escaped, probably with the help of abolitionists, which cost him, personally, a great deal of money.

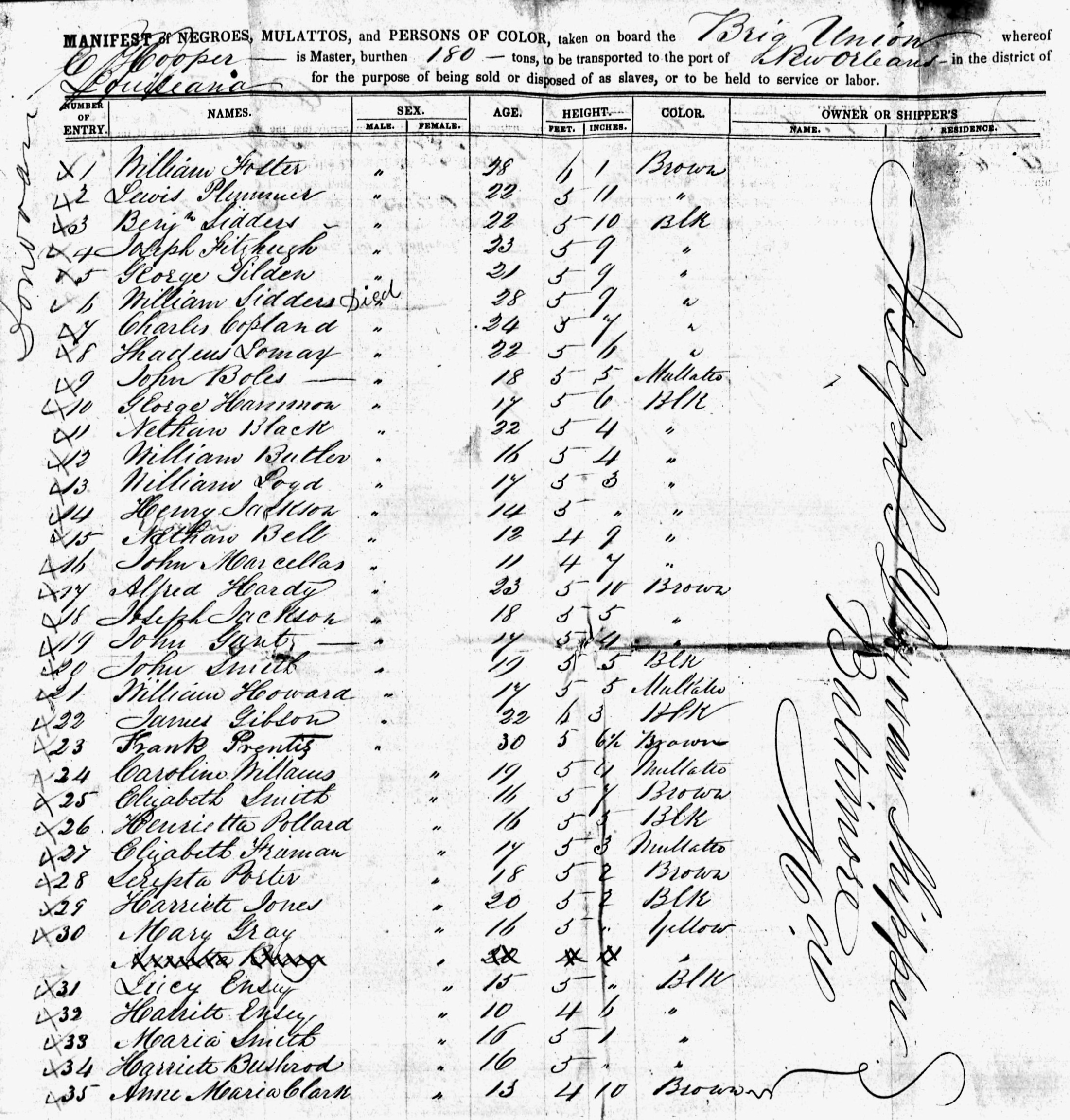
Partial manifest of the coastwise slaver brig Union, showing people shipped by Joseph S. Donovan in 1849

=== 1860s ===
At the time of the 1860 census, Donovan's occupation was said to be slave trader and he owned US$130,000 (equivalent to $4,658,333 in 2025) in real estate and US$220,000 (equivalent to $7,883,333 in 2025) in personal property. In March 1860, Donovan assisted in the return of a free man named John Brown who had been kidnapped into slavery by four men who entered his home in Lancaster, Pennsylvania in the middle of the night. In April 1860, a U.S. Circuit Court was to hear Donovan's suit against a man named James G. Noel "to recover from the defendant the amount paid to him for a negro woman warranted to be in sound health". The result seems to have been a hung jury.

Donovan died on April 15, 1861, just as the American Civil War was getting underway. The Baltimore Sun reported his death as follows: "Deceased. Joseph S. Donovan, Esq., a well-known slave-dealer, and extensively known throughout the South, died yesterday morning, after a short illness, at his residence, southwest corner of Eutaw and Camden sts." The following day the same paper published another notice: "His male friends are respectfully invited to attend his funeral, on this (Tuesday) afternoon, at three o'clock, from his late residence." Donovan was buried in Baltimore's Green Mount Cemetery in the Summit Vaults area, lot six.

== Slave jails ==
Donovan had four trading sites in Baltimore over the course of his career, most or all of which seemingly had associated prison facilities where people were stored until they could be shipped south. Donovan also offered "boarding" where slaves could be held while their legal owners traveled, etc.

Joseph S. Donovan business addresses and slave jails
Years	Location	Notes
~1840–~1842	Light & Montgomery	
1843–1847	Pratt & Cove	See: Austin Woolfolk#Slave jail
1846–1858 (Note: In 1854 J.M. Wilson advertised that they were trading at 11 Camden, which had previously been occupied by J.S. Donovan.)	13 Camden, near Light	Donovan advertised the site's proximity to Camden Station
1858–1861	Eutaw & Camden	Near where the Babe's Dream statue stands today

== Legacy ==
Like many of the major traders in key cities of the Chesapeake region, Donovan was widely noted in American abolitionist literature. His advertisements received comment in William I. Bowditch's Slavery and the Constitution (1849), American Scenes and Christian Slavery (1849), and Harriet Beecher Stowe's A Key to Uncle Tom's Cabin (1852).

When Donovan's widow died in 1890, the value of her estate was estimated to be US$2,000,000 (equivalent to $71,666,667 in 2025). The pallbearers at Caroline Donovan's funeral included Mayor of Baltimore F. C. Latrobe, chemistry professor and Johns Hopkins University president Ira Remsen, and Col. Albert Ritchie. The Donovans had no children so the fortune was divided between nieces and nephews, along with a number of charitable bequests. Among the gifts was major donation to Johns Hopkins University, resulting in the Caroline Donovan endowed chair in the English department. In 2023, the University sought court approval to remove her name from the endowment as part of an initiative to disassociate itself from slavery heritages.

== See also ==
- List of Maryland slave traders
- History of slavery in Maryland
- History of African Americans in Baltimore
- Merchants' Exchange Building (Baltimore) – Multipurpose structure, ~1815–~1902
- Slave markets and slave jails in the United States
