= Shadrack F. Slatter =

American slave trader and capitalist (1798–1861)

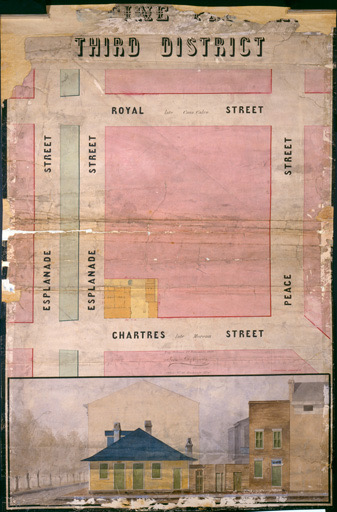
- Chartres (previously Moreau) and Esplanade, illustration made 1866 (New Orleans Notarial Archive)
- Born: December 13, 1798; Georgia, U.S.
- Died: July 5, 1861 (aged 62); Mississippi, U.S.
- Other names: S. F. Slatter, Col. Slatter
- Occupations: Slave trader, real estate investor

Shadrack Fluellen Slatter (December 13, 1798 – July 5, 1861), usually listed as S. F. Slatter in advertisements and often called Col. Slatter in later life, was a 19th-century American slave trader and capitalist. In the 1830s and 1840s he was part of the coastwise slave trade in partnership with his older brother Hope H. Slatter, who bought slaves in Baltimore for S. F. Slatter to sell at New Orleans. It was typical for interstate traders like the Slatters to have a buying location in the Upper South and a selling location in the Lower South. After quitting the retail slave trade, he was a real estate developer and landlord in New Orleans. In the late 1850s he was heavily involved in promoting and funding the freelance invasion of Nicaragua by William Walker (with the end goal of expanding the slave-holding territory of the United States). Fort Slatter in Nicaragua was named in Slatter's honor.

== Biography ==
Slatter was born in Old Clinton, Georgia. In spring 1832 S. F. Slatter was buying and selling in East Macon, Georgia, advertising "The Subscriber keeps constantly on hand a supply of GEORGIA NEGROES for sale. They win be found to be of such age or sex as will suit any purchaser. He now has 10 or 12 on hand. He will also purchase YOUNG NEGROES for whom Cash will he given." In 1833, H. H. and S. F. Slatter and two other traders offered 200 people for sale in Hamburg, South Carolina. It was illegal to transport slaves into Georgia from out of state, so "Hamburg, South Carolina was built up just opposite Augusta, for the purpose of furnishing slaves to the planters of Georgia. Augusta is the market to which the planters of Upper and Middle Georgia bring their cotton; and if they want to purchase negroes, they step over into Hamburg and do so. There are two large houses there, with piazzas in front to expose the 'chattels' to the public during the day, and yards in rear of them where they are penned up at night like sheep, so close that they can hardly breathe, with bull-dogs on the outside as sentinels. They sometimes have thousands here for sale, who in consequence of their number suffer most horribly."

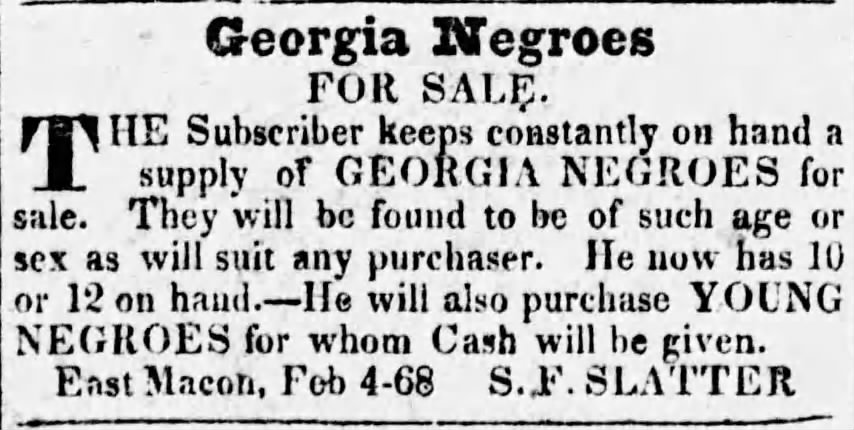
"Georgia Negroes for Sale" Macon Weekly Telegraph, March 10, 1832

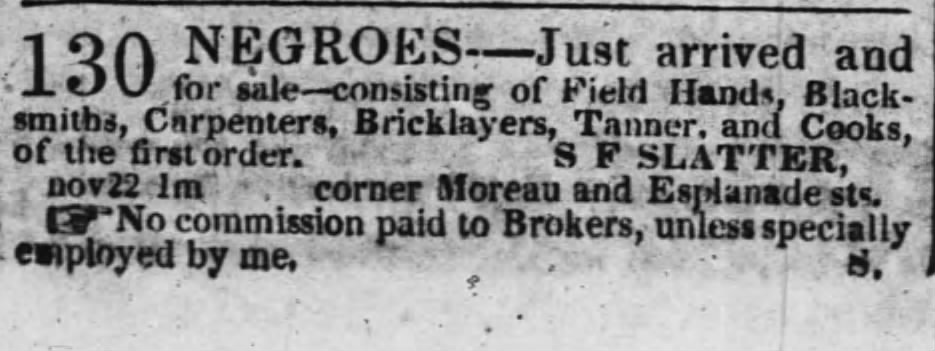
"130 Negroes, Just Arrived" The Times-Picayune, New Orleans, December 19, 1843

In February 1837, records show that Shadrack Fluwellen Slatter of Clinton, Jones County, Georgia sold a 25-year-old enslaved man named Tildman who had been purchased by Slatter in Maryland. Tildman was sold for US$1,100 (equivalent to $31,301 in 2025) to Martin Gordon Penn of St. Tammany Parish, Louisiana.

Slatter's New Orleans trading site was on Moreau (later Chartres) and Esplanade circa 1840. This site was part of a cluster of slave-trading depots just east of the French Quarter. Slatter's role in the family business was to preside "over a 'showroom' of captives taken from the mid-Atlantic states and put on sale."

James H. Hammond was one of Slatter's customers. S. F. Slatter sold the "showroom" to Walter L. Campbell in 1848. According to historian Walter Johnson, J. M. Wilson and Joseph Bruin also traded at this site. At the time of the 1850 U.S. census, he was a resident of the City Hotel in New Orleans, occupation trader. According to Parson Brownlow in 1858, Slatter was known as a "rich old bachelor" who owned "the City Hotel, and the New Orleans Arcade, two houses which he rents for about $40,000." In 1859 he was elected one of the directors of the New Orleans, Jackson and Great Northern Railroad.

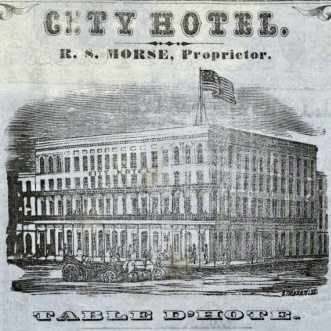
Slatter lived at the City Hotel, located at the northeast corner of Common and Camp (University of Houston Libraries)

At the time of the 1860 U.S. census, he was a resident of the City Hotel in New Orleans. His occupation was listed as capitalist. In 1860 he reported owning US$500,000 (equivalent to $17,916,667 in 2025) in real estate and had personal property worth US$120,000 (equivalent to $4,300,000 in 2025).

== Death and estate ==
Slatter died in Mississippi on July 5, 1861. He was unmarried at the time of his death. The informant on his New Orleans death certificate was his 18-year-old nephew Hope H. Slatter Jr. There is a record (index number 18263) of the succession of the estate of Shadrack F. Slatter in the Orleans parish archive. The estate was still being litigated as of 1873.

== Invasion of Nicaragua ==
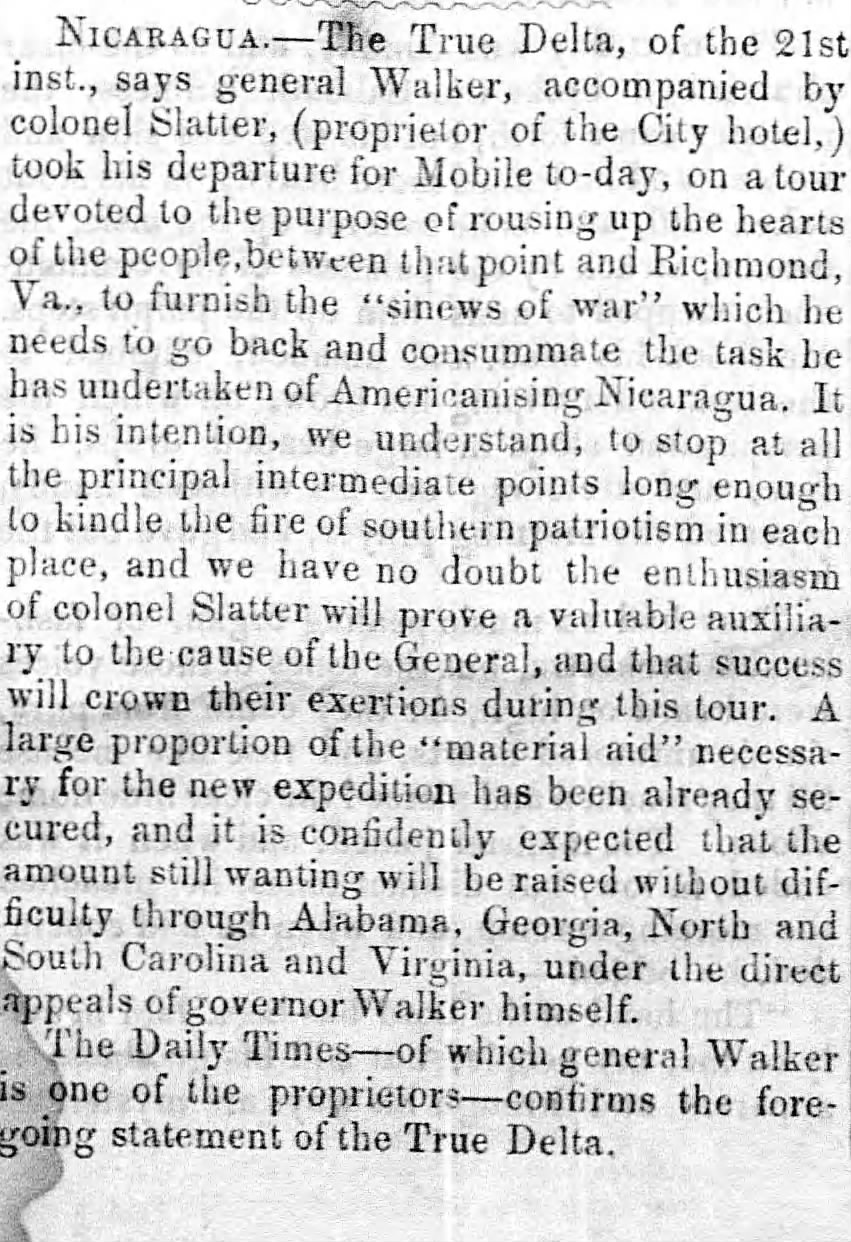
"Nicaragua" The South-Western, July 29, 1857

In April 1856, Slatter signed an open letter to Pierre Soulé requesting an update on the "Central American question" and "of the ulterior objects to be forwarded" by "friends of the American movement in Nicaragua." According to the history Filibusters and Financiers (1916), "on August 28 [1856] a new decree was issued authorizing a loan of $500,000 for twenty years at six per cent, secured by one million acres of [Nicaraguan] public lands. Messrs. M. Pilcher and S. F. Slatter of New Orleans were constituted agents for negotiating the loan, and arrangements were made for payment of the interest at the Bank of Louisiana. Pilcher and Slatter were also made agents for the sale of public lands in Nicaragua. The only bonds that Walker's government ever disposed of were sold through this agency."

There was a Fort Slatter used as a base during the Lockridge Expedition that was located about 20 miles (32 km) "below Castillo" that was named for "a gentleman of New Orleans who had largely contributed to the filibuster cause." According to Brownlow of Knoxville, Slatter had personally invested $40,000 in the Nicaragua project, "and has been the friend of Walker all the time."

In July 1857, Slatter accompanied Walker on what was likely a fundraising trip to Richmond, Virginia; the New Orleans True Delta wrote, "It is his intention, we understand, to stop at all the principal intermediate points long enough to kindle the fire of southern patriotism in each place, and we have no doubt the enthusiasm of colonel Slatter will prove a valuable auxiliary to the cause of the General." In October 1857, the Louisville Courier reported that "letters from Mississippi state that officers are rapidly recruiting men for Walker's army, destined for Nicaragua. Col. Slatter, of New Orleans, is doing the financiering and talking for Gen. Walker, who expects to leave early in November."

When federal marshals arrested Walker in November 1857, Soulé and "Col. Slatter" posted the $2,000 bond. Walker jumped bail. More than 30 years later, in 1890, Slatter's nephew Hope H. Slatter II reached a deal with the U.S. government to pay $300 to fulfill the guarantee.

== See also ==
- Appleton Oaksmith
- List of American slave traders
- History of New Orleans
