= Hope H. Slatter II =

Confederate-American heir (1841–aft. 1900)

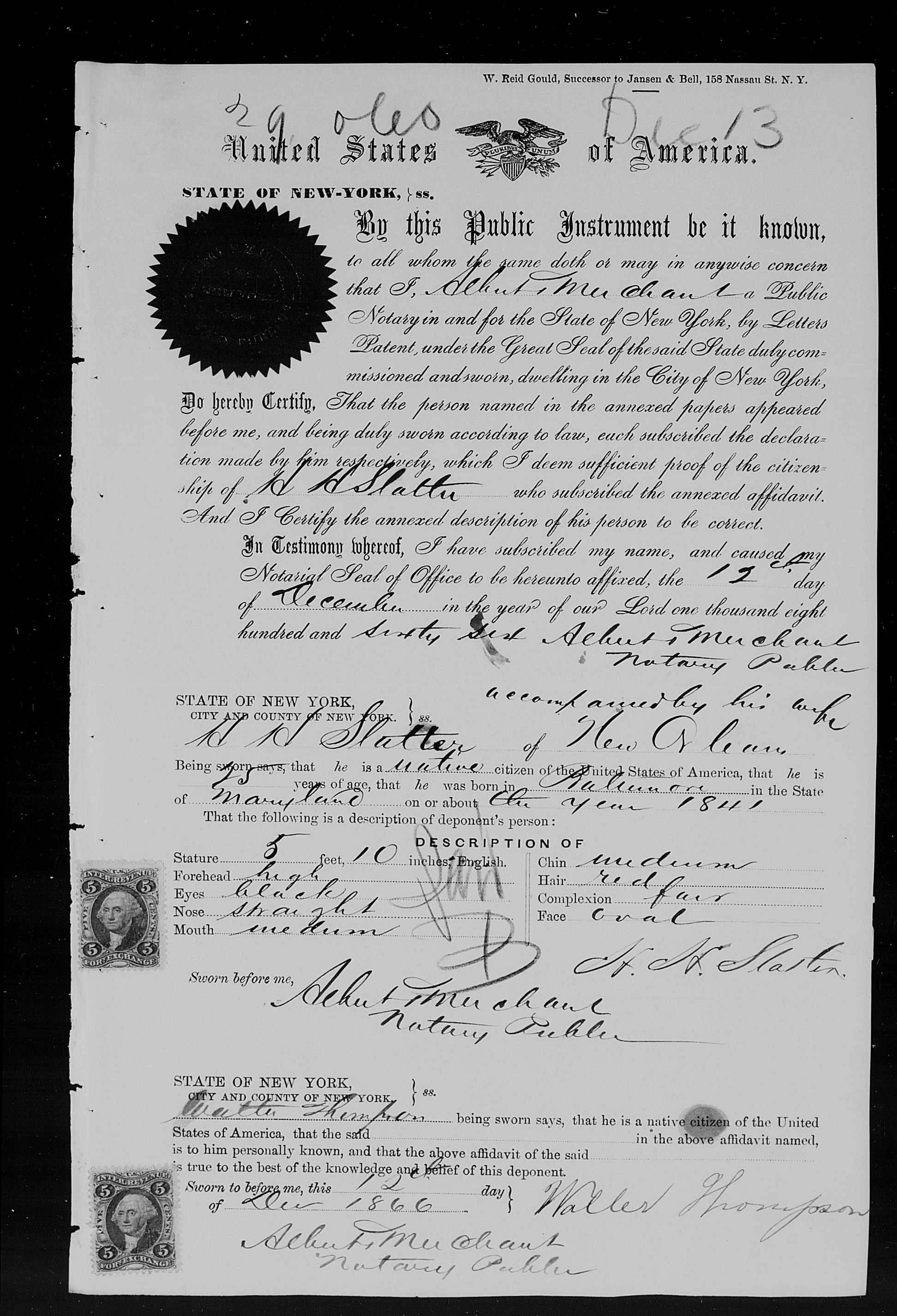
Hope H. Slatter II - 1866 passport application

Hope H. Slatter II (1841 – after 1900) was a convicted murderer, municipal police chief, Confederate States Army veteran, and one of the sons of notable American slave trader Hope H. Slatter.

== Biography ==
Slatter was born in 1841 in Baltimore, before his father sold out of the slaving business and became a real estate investor in Mobile, Alabama. Slatter grew up in Mobile, and eventually attended Georgetown College (later Georgetown University), class of 1862. When the American Civil War broke out he joined the Confederate States Army, apparently as a second lieutenant in the 1st Alabama Infantry Regiment. In 1863 he accidentally shot and killed one Thomas Carver. According to an affidavit submitted in 1875, "Mr. Slatter was fully exonerated from all intentional blame, so much so that it was not thought necessary to have a trial of the case at all. Being the commanding officer of the battalion at the time of the sad occurrence, the deponent [Price Williams Jr. of Mobile, Alabama] made this statement in justice to the character of the living and the dead."

On August 6, 1873, while attending the Schuetzenfest "annual shooting competition and beer bash" at Schuetzen Park in Washington, D.C., Slatter stabbed and killed one Michael Hussey. Slatter fled the scene of the crime but was captured in Virginia; when the police caught up with him he had with him a spring-back dagger and was sitting under a tree with a picnic basket that had been packed with "a lot of crackers, three fresh boiled spring chickens on toast, a bottle of fine brandy, and a box of matches." Slatter Jr. was convicted of murder by a jury, but used his "considerable" inherited slave-trade wealth to bribe a federal district attorney to get him out of a murder conviction, he then testified against the attorney on charges of accepting a bribe. During his fewer than three years in prison for murder, Slatter apparently did not enjoy the hospitality of the Albany Penitentiary and "told a piteous tale of the severity of the discipline, by which the convicts are compelled to keep their eyes on the ground and not allowed to utter a syllable under pain of punishment by the shower bath, dark dungeon, flogging, etc."

In 1883, Slatter was appointed to be the chief of police of Mobile, Alabama.

In 1890, Hope H. Slatter II reached a deal with the U.S. government to pay $300 to fulfill a bond guarantee made by his uncle, capitalist Shadrack F. Slatter. (Back in November 1857, federal marshals had arrested freelance imperialist William Walker; politician Pierre Soulé and "Col. Slatter" posted the $2,000 bond for the standard bearer of the planned Golden Circle greater pro-slavery prosperity sphere. Walker jumped bail, leaving S. F. Slatter on the hook for the money).

Hope H. Slatter Jr. was a resident of Mobile, Alabama as of the 1900 U.S. census. He is most likely buried in the family mausoleum at Magnolia Cemetery in Mobile, Alabama.

== See also ==
- Henry F. Slatter, his older half-brother
