= Henry F. Slatter =

American slave trader (1817–1849)

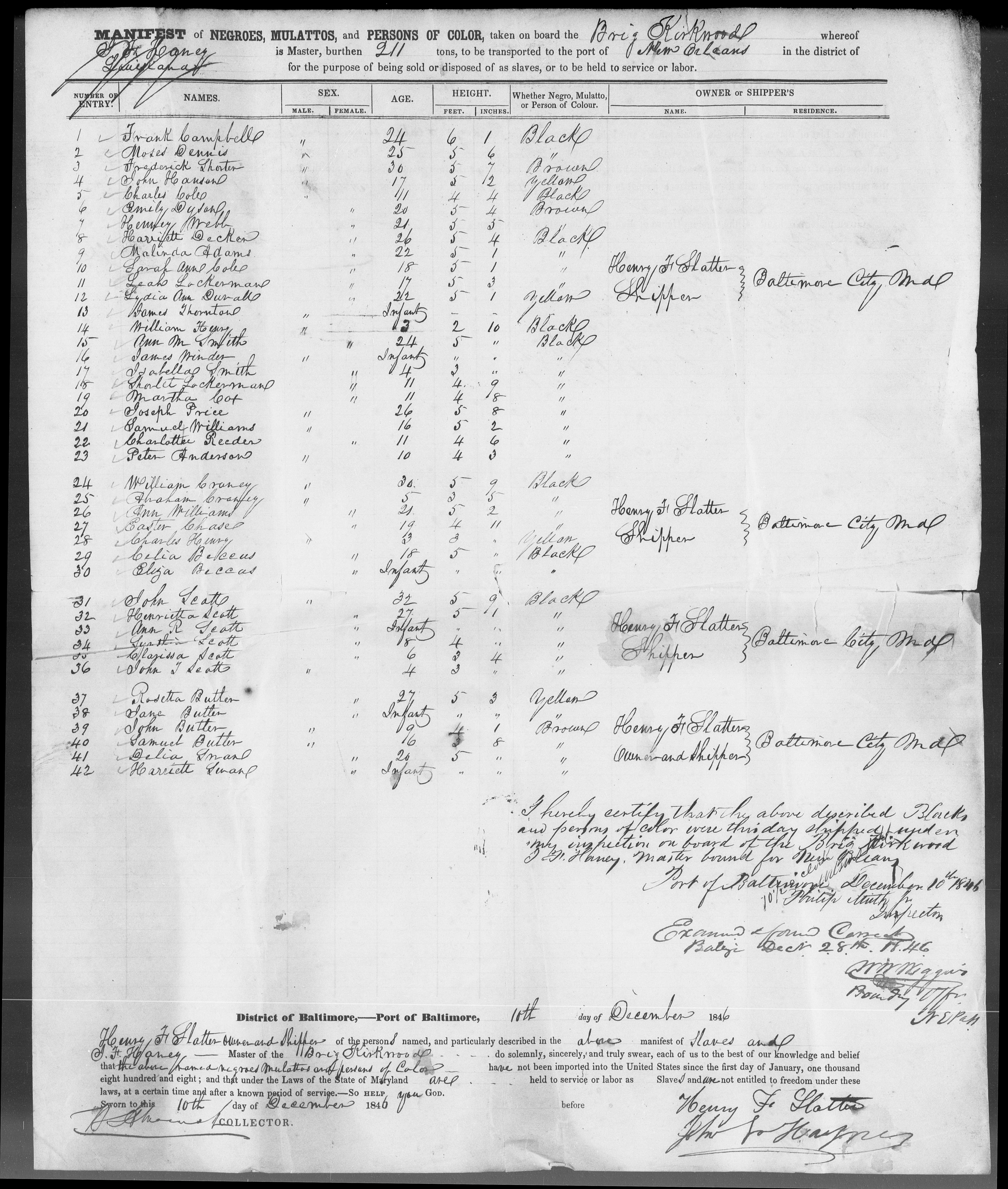
- Brig Kirkwood, Henry F. Slatter shipper (Note: For another use of the Kirkwood in 1846 as coastwise slaver, see Jonathan M. Wilson § Notes)—nine days after this ship was cleared by the New Orleans Customs House, Slatter & Lockett advertised that they had just received "a valuable lot of slaves from Virginia and Maryland, consisting of Mechanics, Farm Hands, and House Servants"
- Born: July 26, 1817
- Died: April 7, 1849 (aged 31); Macon County, Georgia, U.S.
- Occupation: Slave trader

Henry Flewellen Slatter (July 26, 1817 – April 11, 1849) was a 19th-century American slave trader. Among other things, Slatter escorted coastwise shipments of people from slave jail of his father Hope H. Slatter in Baltimore to the slave depot of his uncle Shadrack F. Slatter in New Orleans. H. F. Slatter died of tuberculosis in his father's home state of Georgia.

== Biography ==
Henry F. Slatter was Hope H. Slatter's son and Shadrack F. Slatter's nephew. Historians believe he was an integral part of the Slatters' interstate trading operation between Baltimore, Maryland and the New Orleans slave market. Henry F. Slatter appears as "shipper" on a number of Baltimore to New Orleans slave-ship manifests.

In April 1845, Henry Slatter sold 15 people (Daniel Powell, James Seafus, Gabriel Lee, Alexander Young, Sylvester Miller, Dick Bell, Robert Spriggs, William Johnston, John King, John Williams, Mordicai Jordon, Brish Barnes, Mathilda Hampton, and Mary Dorsey) to Mrs. Helene A. Olivier Reggio in New Orleans. In August 1845, three men—Jonathan Means Wilson, William H. Williams of the Yellow House in Washington, D.C., and Henry Slatter—all placed identical ads in the New Orleans Bee stating that Mr. Edward Barnett was their "duly authorized agent" while they were gone from the city. Historian Alexandra J. Finley describes Barnett as a "go-to notary for slave traders" who worked at one time as an agent for Wilson (who in turn had been an agent for Hope H. Slatter in Baltimore until 1841).

According to the Digital Library of American Slavery database of race and slavery petitions:

In 1844, John Strom purchased from Henry F. Slatter of New Orleans a slave named James for $690, but within four or five days James died from pleurisy 'or a disease of like character.' Slatter, the petitioner, contends that James was in good health when sold to Strom, but that he caught 'pleurisy' from exposure to intemperate weather only a couple of days after the sale and while in Strom's possession. Slatter further contends that, at first, Strom did not make any demands on him but, being in small pecuniary circumstances, requested him to bear half the loss. Slatter denied the request. In 1845, however, Strom sued Slatter, who owned land in the city of Montgomery, arguing that James was sick when he was sold. The next year, Strom won a civil suit with a jury awarding him seven hundred dollars. Now, in a countersuit, Slatter contends that James died 'from exposure to bad weather' and 'was sound and free from disease' when sold. Slatter asks for an injunction restraining Strom 'and all others his agents and attornies from the collecting of said judgment and any further proceedings.'

Henry Slatter was listed as a negro trader in the 1846 New Orleans city directory, working at the corner of Esplanade and Moreau. In October 1846, H. F. Slatter of 56 Esplanade in New Orleans advertised a horse, buggy, and harness, offered for sale "on account of departure." From January 1847 to June 1847, H. F. Slatter ran a "Cash for Five Hundred Negroes" in Baltimore papers that was later noticed in abolitionist William I. Bowditch's Slavery and the Constitution book of 1849. In September 1848 he bought Montgomery Hall (...a hotel?) in Montgomery, Alabama. Slatter died of consumption in Macon County, Georgia, in 1849 at age 31. He is buried in company with a number of other Slatters in Clinton Cemetery, Jones County, Georgia.

== See also ==
- List of American slave traders
- Hope H. Slatter II, his younger half-brother
