= Austin Woolfolk =

American slave trader (1796–1847)

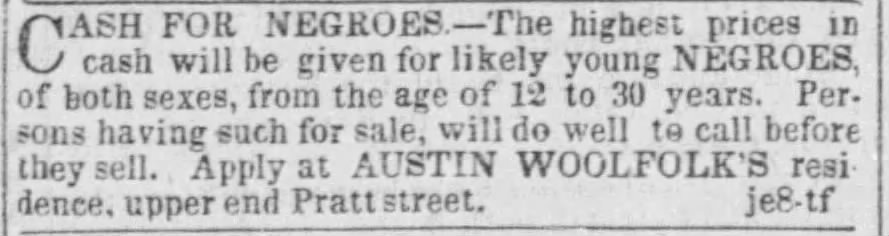
- "Cash for Negroes" The Baltimore Sun, September 23, 1839
- Born: 1796; Georgia, U.S.
- Died: 1847 (aged 50–51); Auburn, Alabama, U.S.
- Occupation: Slave trader
- Relatives: Major William Woolfolk (father); John Woolfolk (uncle); Austin Woolfolk (uncle); Joseph B. Woolfolk (brother); Samuel Martin Woolfolk (brother); Richard Woolfolk (brother)

Austin Woolfolk (1796 – 1847) was an American slave trader and plantation owner. Among the busiest slave traders in Maryland, he trafficked more than 2,000 enslaved people through the Port of Baltimore to the Port of New Orleans, and became notorious in time for selling Frederick Douglass's aunt, and for assaulting Benjamin Lundy after the latter had criticized him.

== Biography ==
Austin Woolfolk was born in 1796 in the U.S. state of Georgia. He served as lieutenant in Andrew Jackson's army during the War of 1812, serving under his father Colonel William Woolfolk. Woolfolk participated in the Battle of New Orleans. He moved to Baltimore in 1815 or 1819, where he married Emily Sparks in 1839 with whom he had four children, two of which were adopted.

Woolfolk became a slave trader in Baltimore, where he had an office on Pratt Street, with a pen where he kept his slaves. Even though he advertised in newspapers, he moved his slaves at night to avoid attracting attention. He became notorious for selling Frederick Douglass's aunt, and for assaulting Benjamin Lundy after the latter had criticized him. For this attack, Woolfolk pleaded guilty to assault, and received a one dollar fine and was ordered to pay court costs.

Woolfolk was driven "out of business" by slave traders Isaac Franklin and John Armfield when they moved to Baltimore. Woolfolk died February 10, 1847 in Auburn, Alabama.

DIED - In Auburn, Macon County, Ala., on the 10th inst., Austin Woolfolk, on his way from Baltimore to his home and family in Louisiana, in the fond-hope of reaching them ere death had laid his icy hand upon him, he struggled on from place to place, against tho advice of his friends and the [ruthlessness] of his [disease], notwithstanding he was utterly unfit to bear the fatigues of traveling, and the unavoidable exposure to an inclement season. He died about 50 years of age after an illness of two years duration, his constitution, originally a strong one, gradually giving way, despite of human remedies, to the [foul][?] destroyer, Consumption. Though far from home and family, his last moments were not soothed and tended by strangers alone. His Uncle, John Woolfolk, was with him, and brought his [remains] to be interred in the cemetery of this city. To the people of Auburn, his relatives here, and bereaved family, owe many thanks, for their kindness and attention to him in his last illness. He left a Father, a Brother and three Sisters in Tennessee, and a wife and five children in Louisiana, to mourn their loss. Columbus Enq. Ga.

"Negroes for Sale" advertisement placed by John Woolfolk(Louisiana Advertiser, June 2, 1826)

Austin Woolfolk's brothers, Samuel Martin Woolfolk, Joseph Biggers Woolfolk, and Richard Woolfolk, and two of his uncles, John Woolfolk of Augusta, Georgia, and Austin Woolfolk, also worked in the slave trade. Woolfolk of New Orleans sold an enslaved man named Jim to William R. Barrow in 1825.

One Augustin Woolfolk may also have been a relation and slave trader.

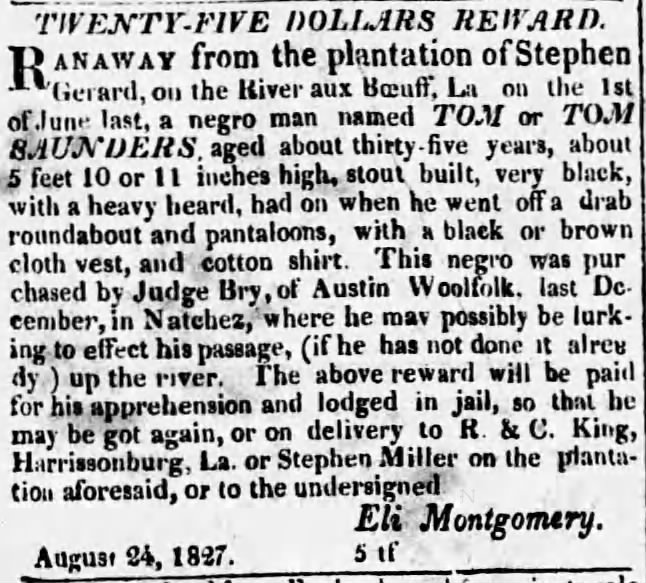
"This negro was purchased by Judge Bry, of Austin Woolfolk, last December in Natchez..." The Weekly Natchez Courier, August 31, 1827

According to a Woolfolk family history published in 2004, "Some say he was engaged in slave trading...but more likely he was buying large numbers of slaves to use on his extensive sugar plantations in Iberville Parish, Louisiana." Historians of slavery have found that owning a plantation in the sales region was a "time-worn" technique for slave traders who sought to obscure the purpose of their traffic in large numbers of slaves, which could arguably endanger their reputation in the community or in some cases put them in legal jeopardy. Furthermore, according to professional historians, Woolfolk was a pioneer magnate of Baltimore-based slave trading, along with figures like Joseph S. Donovan, Bernard M. Campbell, and Hope H. Slatter. In 1933 Mississippi historian Charles S. Sydnor called Woolfolk a slave trader "too famous to require comment." The journal Civil War History published a monograph about slave trader Woolfolk in 1977. A reviewer in the Journal of Southern History commended the 2004 Woolfolk book as an "exemplar of modern genealogical work" but criticized the author's "hagiographic slant...Moreover, Woolfolk subtly presents the Civil War in the 'Lost Cause' mode...In one of several instances of this, she writes: 'Woolfolk family members...supported the Confederate cause for states' rights' as if states' rights was the cause of the Civil War. And, although passing references are made to the Woolfolk family slaves, their participation in the narrative is minute compared to the contribution they made to the family's fortunes." Woolfolk himself advertised to the sell side as he did to the buy side. The following advertisement appeared in the newspaper of Woodville, Mississippi for three months:

NEGROES FOR SALE. The subscriber has on hand seventy-five likely young Virginia-born Negroes, of various descriptions, which he offers to sell low for cash, or good acceptance; any person wishing to purchase would do well to call and suit themselves.—I will have a constant supply through the season.—I can be found at Purnell's Tavern. Natchez, December 1st, 1826. "Austin Woolfolk."

== Slave jail ==
Austin Woolfolk's Jail
- Interactive map of Austin Woolfolk's Jail
- Location: Baltimore, Maryland; 39.2863°N 76.6283°W
- Status: Defunct
- Capacity: 40+

More than 30 years after his death, a newspaper described Woolfolk's former premises:

The stranger, in passing along West Platt street, between Fremont and Poppleton, in this conservative old city of Baltimore, will notice with interest an old-fashioned house that stands on the north side of the way high above the sidewalk. It is a stone structure, of antique design, two stories in height, with little square windows that more clearly indicate the extreme age of the building than anything else about it. It is in the centre of an old yard that might have been green with verdure when the big gaunt trees that are bending and splitting under their far-reaching boughs were much younger than they are now; the walls are blackened by the hand of time, and the steep roof is crumbling under the coating of soft moss.

The stone wall of the yard that bounds the lot on Pratt street has two rusty iron doors in it, which mark tho entrances two large cavernous passages that extend beneath the yard. If you should open them, (though such a thing has not been done for these many years), you would find yourself in an archway that leads into utter darkness. Light your way along either of the passages, amid the dust and cobwebs, frightening the rats and spiders in their solitary domain, and you would emerge into a square cell, floored and walled with solid blocks of granite, with here and there a rusty iron ring imbedded in the stone, which at once suggests to your mind the nature of the place you are in. There are other iron doors to be distinguished in dark corners, and if you should draw their bolts you should come upon other strong cells, like the first, eight in all. Some of them have trap doors at the top opening into the old house above, and in others rusty chains still hang from bolted rings, awakening sad visions of oppression.

There is not much more to be seen here but damp dirt, spreading cobwebs and perhaps the wreck of a beer keg from the bar up-stairs, for the old house is now used as a saloon by an humble Teuton and his wife, while the surrounding grounds are a popular evening resort with the poor but worthy residents of the neighborhood, where they sip their lager and gossip beneath the broad foliage of the noble old trees. This is Wolfoulk's Jail, at one time the best known and most flourishing slave jail in all the South.

The jail was known to antebellum abolitionists, who reported that it could house 40 or more people prior to shipment south. According to historian William Calderhead, "The movement of his charges to Baltimore was accomplished either by steamboat or small sailing vessel from the outports along the Chesapeake or by wagon or hack from nearby land connections."

The site of Woolfolk's slave jail is now a Baltimore city park.

== See also ==
- Decatur slave-ship mutiny
- List of American slave traders
- Andrew Jackson and the slave trade in the United States
