= Hope H. Slatter =

American slave trader (1790–1853)

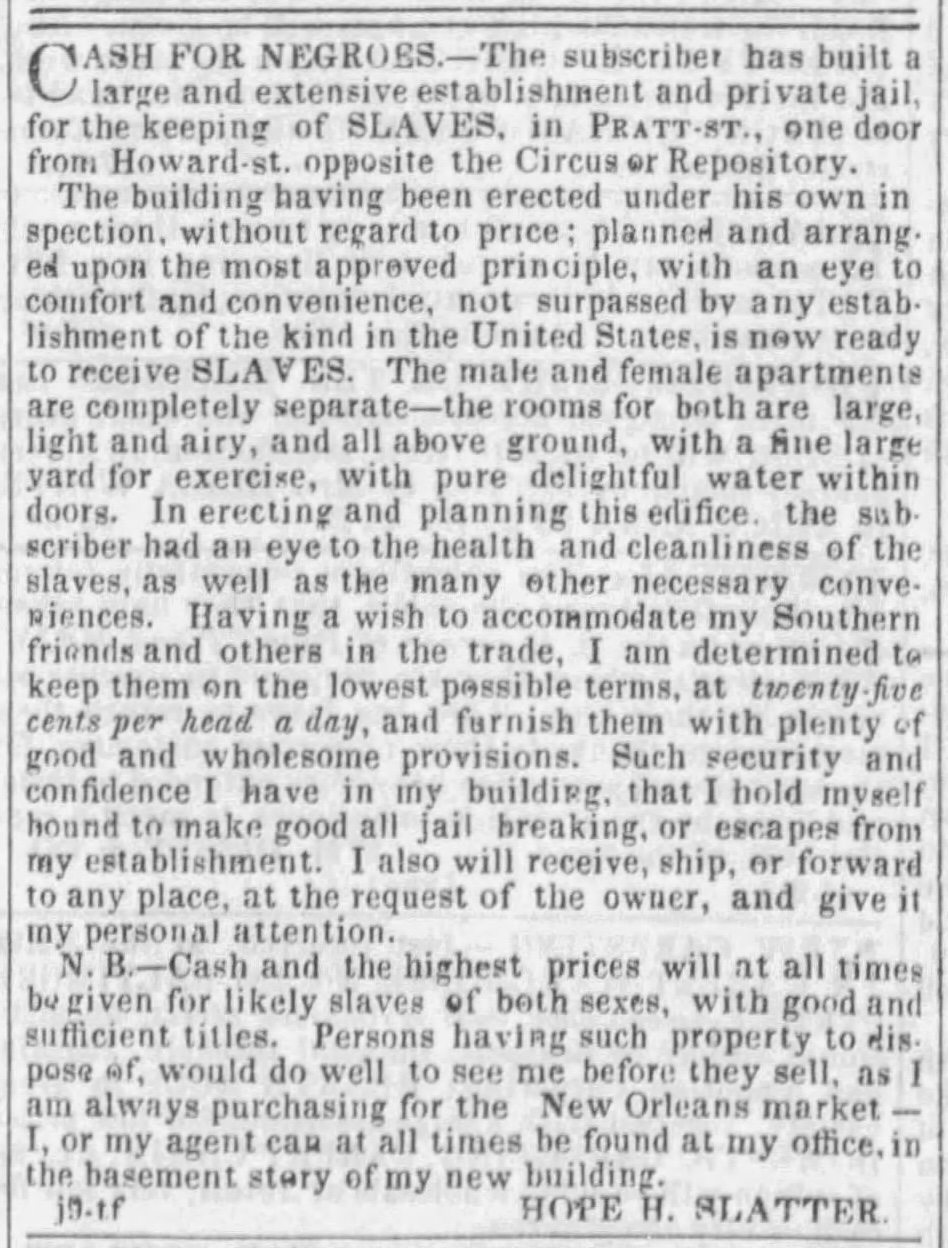
- "Cash for Negroes - HOPE H. SLATTER" (Baltimore Sun, Sept. 5, 1838)
- Born: June 11, 1790; Georgia, U.S.
- Died: September 15, 1853 (aged 63); Alabama, U.S.
- Occupations: Slave trader, planter

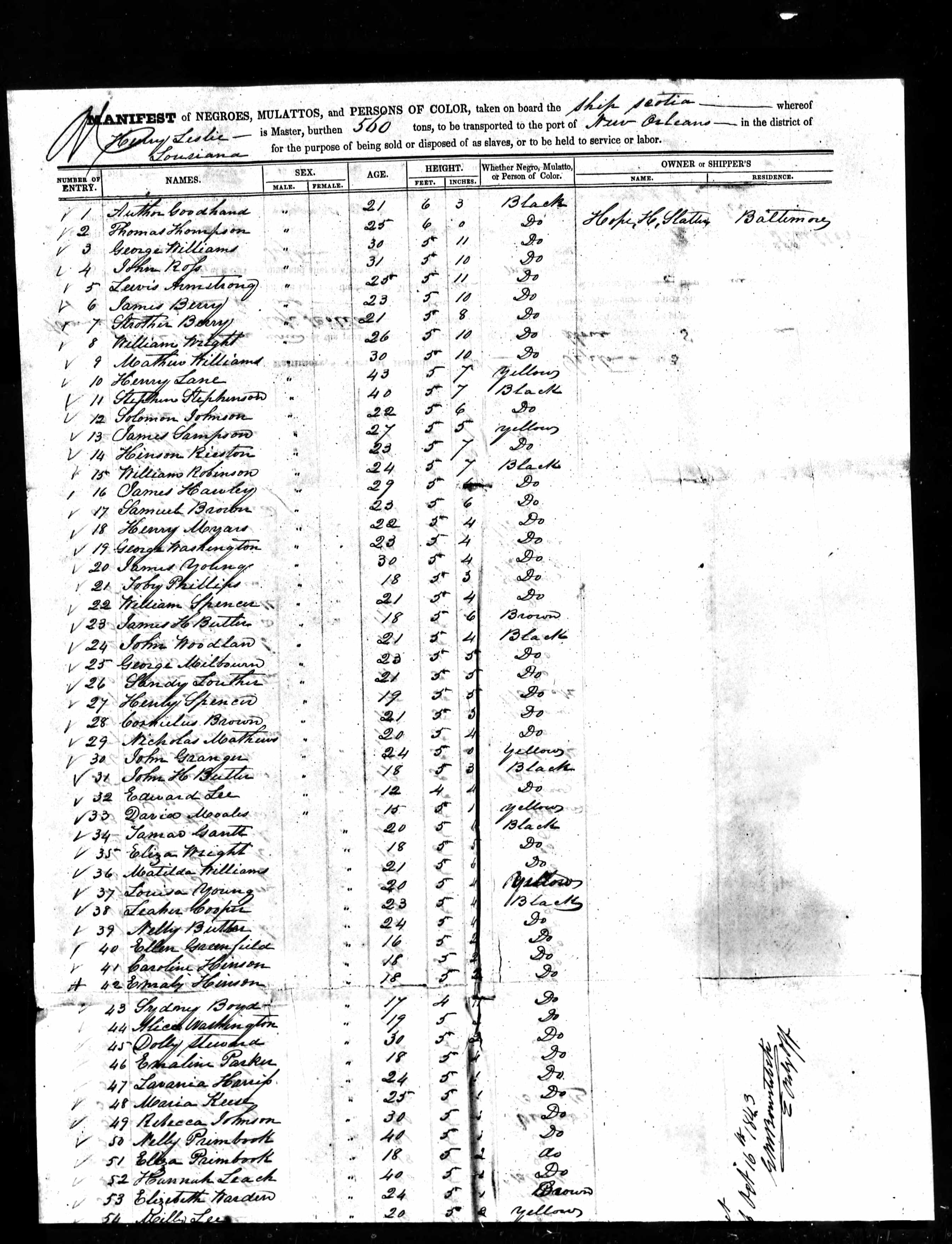
Manifest of a coastwise slave shipment made from Baltimore to New Orleans by Hope H. Slatter, on the ship Scotia in September 1843

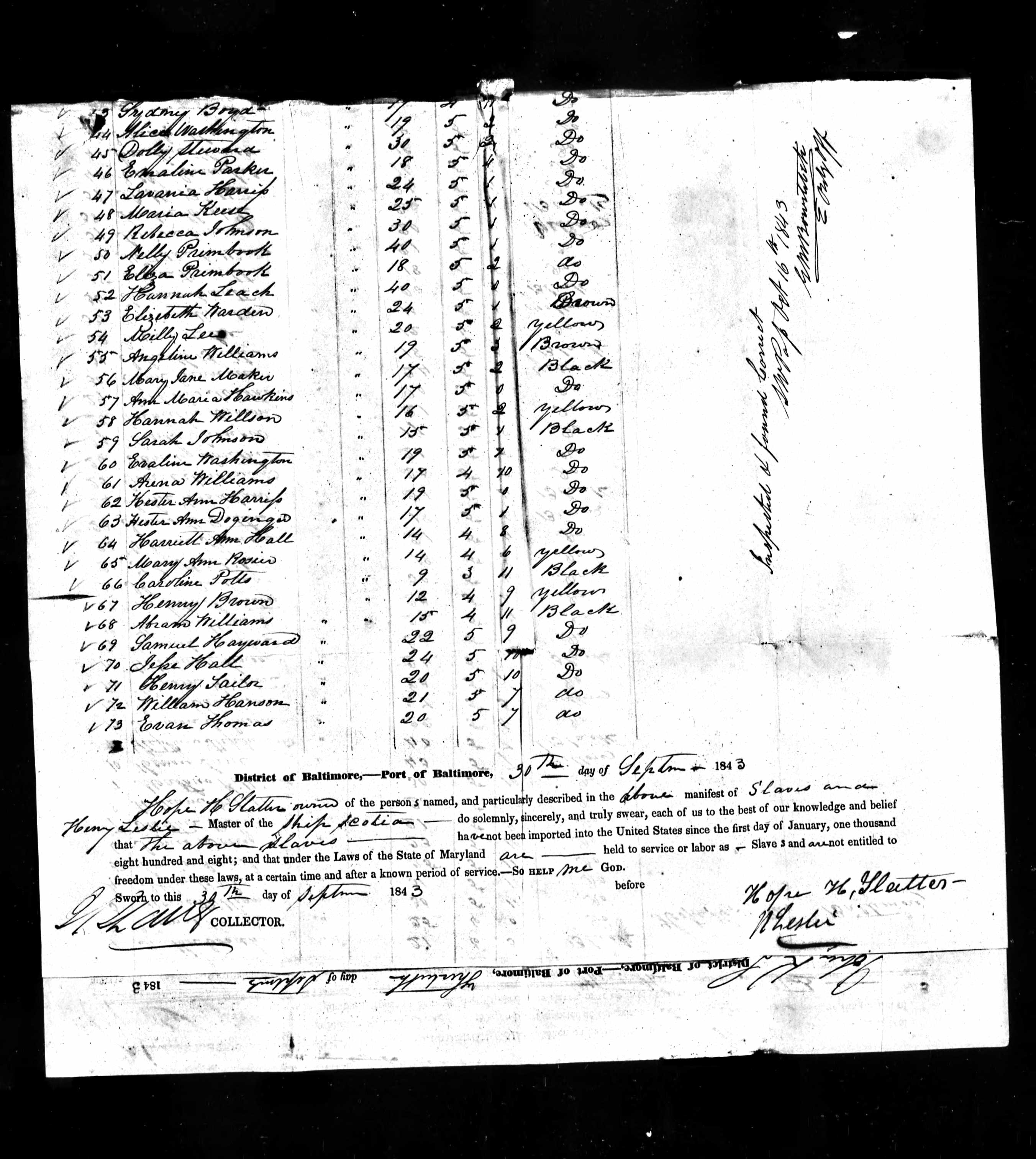
The first group of 66 out of the 73 souls aboard is organized by height; beginning with Author Goodhand, age 21, 6 ft 3 in (1.91 m), ending with Caroline Potts, age nine, 3 ft 11 in (1.19 m); Caroline is the only person with the surname Potts on the manifest

Hope Hull Slatter (June 11, 1790 – September 15, 1853) was a 19th-century American slave trader with an "extensive establishment and private jail, for the keeping of slaves" on Pratt Street in Baltimore, Maryland. He gained "wealth and infamy from the trade in blood," and sold thousands of people from the Chesapeake region to parts south. Slatter, in company with Austin Woolfolk, Bernard M. Campbell, and Joseph S. Donovan has been described as one of the "tycoons of the slave trade" in the Upper South, collectively "responsible for the forced departures of approximately 9,000 captives from Baltimore to New Orleans."

He worked in partnership with his younger brother Shadrack F. Slatter, who maintained their New Orleans sales operation. Slatter's son Henry F. Slatter was also involved in the family slave-trading business.

== Biography ==
Slatter was from the small settlement of Clinton, Georgia, located in the dead center of the state. He was named for Rev. Hope Hull, a Methodist minister. He served in McIntosh's Division of the Georgia Militia during the War of 1812, working as assistant forage-master.

Slatter may have been in the slave trade as early as 1817. He appears to have been in business by 1828, at which time the sheriff of Crawford County, Georgia reported that he had picked up "a negro GIRL, who says her name is Amelia, and that she formerly belonged to Hull Slatter of Jones county, who sold her to a negro trader, whose name she does not recollect—She is about fitteen or sixteen years of age, and of a small size, low and chunkey. The owner is requested to come forward, comply with the law, and take her away." In 1833, H. H. and S. F. Slatter and two other traders offered 200 people for sale in Hamburg, South Carolina. He may have been based in Virginia for a time, and first come to Baltimore, Maryland about 1830, where he had a home and office on West Ball Street. In 1835 he was said to be "the main one" of a dozen slave traders doing business in Baltimore, a hub of the coastwise slave trade.

A Maine-born Baltimore schoolteacher and abolitionist named Solon Beale described Slatter's early career in a Bangor, Maine newspaper article of 1855, writing:

About 1837–8, Hope Hill Slatter, a son of Methodist parents of Georgia, came to Baltimore having borrowed US$4,000 (equivalent to $113,824 in 2025) of his mother, and embarked in the business of buying and selling slaves. He was never a member of the Methodist Church, while in Baltimore, nor did he profess in any way to be a religious man...

Slatter and his family resided in the ninth ward of the city of Baltimore in 1840. His slave prison was on Pratt Street, near Howard. He always shipped out his human cargo on Saturday nights. Slaves to be shipped were often transported from Slatter's to the port by way of horse-drawn omnibuses. He supposedly distributed tobacco to the "boys" held in his pen.

Abolitionist Oliver Johnson visited the prison around 1840 and wrote about it in The Liberator newspaper. A religious delegation visited his slave jail in 1840, and one visitor reported in 1843:

He addressed them somewhat as follows: 'Gentlemen, I suppose this looks strange to you, coming fram the North as you do. I live in a slave State, where the laws fix these matters. These people are with me a short time, I feed and clothe them well, and consider I do not make their condition any worse than it was before.' He showed the gentlemen his establishment, and seemed to take pleasure in doing so. And to tell the whole truth, the place is genteel and comfortable enough for a seminary of learning. But the down-cast look of those poor blacks I shall never forget it...He also had the largest and most ferocious dog I ever saw in a small enclosure. The head colored man told me that this dog would allow no one, white or black, to come near him, but himself. His slave-prison is now regarded as a public nuisance, even in this slave-cursed city.

In the 1840s Slatter caught the attention of abolitionist William I. Bowditch, who included three of his advertisements in his 1849 book Slavery and the Constitution.

"NEGROES WANTED. — Having returned from New Orleans, I will now pay the highest cash prices for all likely negroes that are slaves for life and good titles. All communications will be promptly attended to. HOPE H. SLATTER, Pratt-street."

"N.B. On the 7th day of June, 1841, Jonathan M. Wilson (my former agent), by mutual consent, withdrew from my employment, and is no longer my agent. HOPE H. SLATTER. Baltimore, July 29."

In 1935 an insurance man going through old Atlantic City government documents found a bill of lading for an 1844 shipment of slaves from Hope H. Slatter in Baltimore to Shadrack F. Slatter in New Orleans. Capt. Hugh Martin of the brig Kirkwood and Slatter had negotiated fixed rates by age: $12 each to transport those over 10 years old, $6 for those under 10 years old, and "children at the breast no charge." In 1844 abolitionist William Jay reprinted a newspaper advertisement of Slatter's that instructed potential clients to seek out his agent at Booth's Garden.

The brothers Slatter had a stand in New Orleans at Esplanade and Moreau. It was typical for interstate slave-trading businesses like the one owned by the Slatters to have a buying location in the Upper South and a selling location in the Lower South. In 1848 The Liberator reported that H. H. Slatter had used four men armed with pistols, clubs and Bowie knives to help him quell a crowd surrounding one of his shipments, likely the people who attempted to escape to freedom in the Pearl incident. Around 1848 Slatter sold his premises to Bernard M. Campbell and Walter L. Campbell. According to Carol Wilson's history of the kidnapping of free people of color in the pre-Civil War United States, "By 1839, the [Pennsylvania Abolition Society] was referring to [George] Alberti as the 'well known' kidnapper. His reputation spread beyond the Philadelphia area to Baltimore; in 1837 The Liberator carried a report on Alberti's activities in that city. Two Baltimore policemen traveled to Philadelphia with a warrant from the governor of Maryland for Alberti's arrest. In Baltimore, Alberti and an accomplice, Andrew S. Smith, had been charged with obtaining money under false pretenses after kidnapping two Philadelphia blacks and selling them to Baltimore resident Hope S. Slater [sic] for eleven hundred dollars. When Slater discovered that the two were free, he swore out a complaint before the grand jury, which indicted Alberti and Smith."

After having made his fortune, he built a mansion, and later moved to Florida where he owned a sugar plantation. Slatter lived in Fayetteville, North Carolina for few months and was remembered there as a "well known and wealthy negro trader." He likely owned a plantation in Mobile, Alabama, as well, because at the time the 1850 U.S. census he was the legal owner of 82 enslaved people in that district, 75 male slaves aged 25 to 38, and seven female slaves, aged 25 to 40. Slatter died of disease, a victim of the 1853 yellow fever epidemic. At the time of his death he owned a theater and "the old bank" in Mobile, and was the director of several insurance companies. He died intestate, his heirs were his widow and four children, three of whom were minors at the time of his death.

== Reputation ==
A 21st-century historian has described Slatter as an "iconic human trafficker, a diabolical character wringing profits from human tragedy. But business was steady, and Slatter had rationalizations at the ready". In his day, Slatter seems to have elicited some of the more cutting opprobrium available to abolitionists.

- In 1848, Daniel Drayton observed him loading enslaved people on a train for Georgia and described him as an "old gray-haired villain."
- In 1853, "Looker-On in Baltimore" wrote the Herald of Freedom in Wilmington, Ohio that he had once observed Slatter loading a ship at the port and stated, "Slatter was standing upon deck smiling most Pecksniffianly upon every one as he passed and saying to the anguished girls, 'Never mind, Molly, find another husband better than the one you have left,' and encouraging an old negro in the holds to scrape away upon a cracked fiddle that they might dance."
- In 1855, Beale wrote, "He prided himself on his good morals and genteel manners—was very polite, but even while, at one time, having some influence on account of his money and political opinions, was universally abhorred and detested among all good people in the city. Torrey said to me, Slatter looks like Raphael's picture of Judas Iscariot."
- The Liberator referred to him as "Hope H. Slaughter," a "vile wretch," and a "double-distilled devil."

== See also ==
- Hope H. Slatter II
- List of American slave traders
- Bibliography of the slave trade in the United States
- History of Baltimore
- History of slavery in Maryland
- History of African Americans in Baltimore
- Merchants' Exchange Building (Baltimore) – Multipurpose structure, ~1815–~1902
