= Hatcher =

Hatcher is a surname. Notable people with the surname include:

- Allen Hatcher (born 1944), U.S. mathematician
- Anna Granville Hatcher (1905–1978), U.S. linguist
- Broughton Hatcher (born 1999), American football player
- Edwin Starr (born Charles Edwin Hatcher, 1942–2003), U.S. soul singer
- C. F. Hatcher (~1814–1869), American slave trader
- Charles F. Hatcher (b. 1939), U.S. Congressman
- Chris Hatcher (disambiguation), several people
- Claude A. Hatcher (1876–1933), U.S. pharmacist and soft drink developer (R.C. Cola)
- Derian Hatcher (born 1972), U.S. hockey player
- Gene Hatcher (born 1959), U.S. boxer
- Harlan Hatcher (1898–1998), American academic who served as the eighth President of the University of Michigan
- Jade Hatcher (born 1990), Australian dancer
- Jason Hatcher (born 1982), U.S football player
- Jeffrey Hatcher, U.S. playwright
- John Bell Hatcher (1861–1904), U.S. paleontologist, discoverer of Triceratops
- John T. Hatcher (c. 1824–1866), American slave trader
- Julian Hatcher (1888–1963), U.S. general, firearms expert and author
- Kevin Hatcher (born 1966), U.S. hockey player
- Layne Hatcher (born 1999), American football player
- Leigh Hatcher (born 1955), Australian journalist and news presenter
- Lillian Hatcher (1915–1998), African American riveter and union organizer
- Martin Hatcher (1927-2023), Colorado state senator and college professor
- Mickey Hatcher (born 1955), American baseball player
- Ragen Hatcher, American politician
- Richard G. Hatcher (1933–2019), American politician and lawyer
- Robert D. Hatcher (born 1940), American geologist
- Sue Hatcher, Ph.D. Animal Science, 1995, Australian animal genetics researcher
- Teri Hatcher (born 1964), American actress
- Wiley Ward Hatcher (1828–1908), American politician in Wisconsin
- William S. Hatcher (1935–2005), mathematician and philosopher

== See also ==
=== Places ===
- Hatcher, Georgia, United States
- Hatcher, Kentucky, United States
- Hatchers, Virginia, United States
