= New Orleans slave market =

U.S. antebellum business cluster

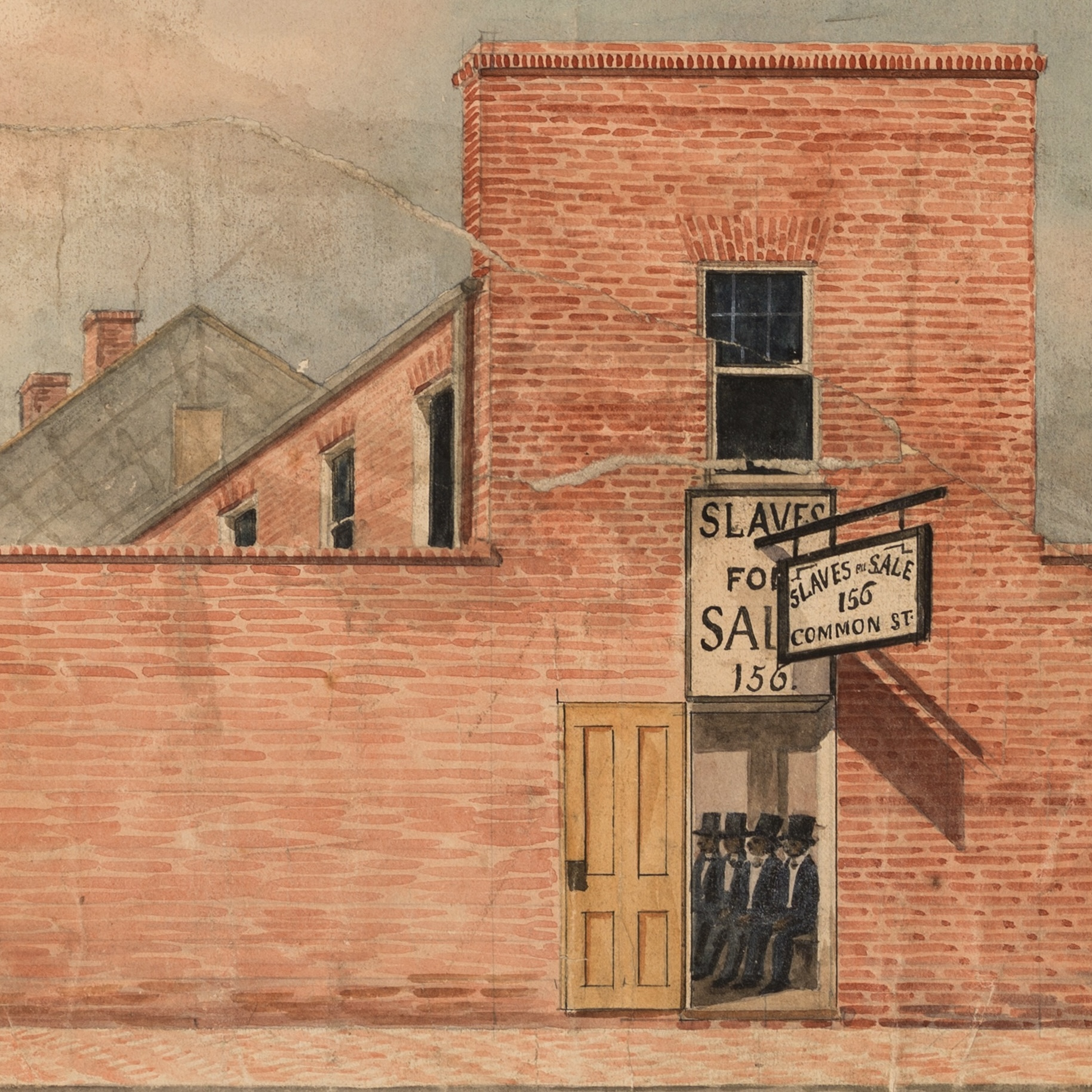
Slaves for Sale, 156 Common St., watercolor and ink by draftsman Pietro Gualdi, 1855

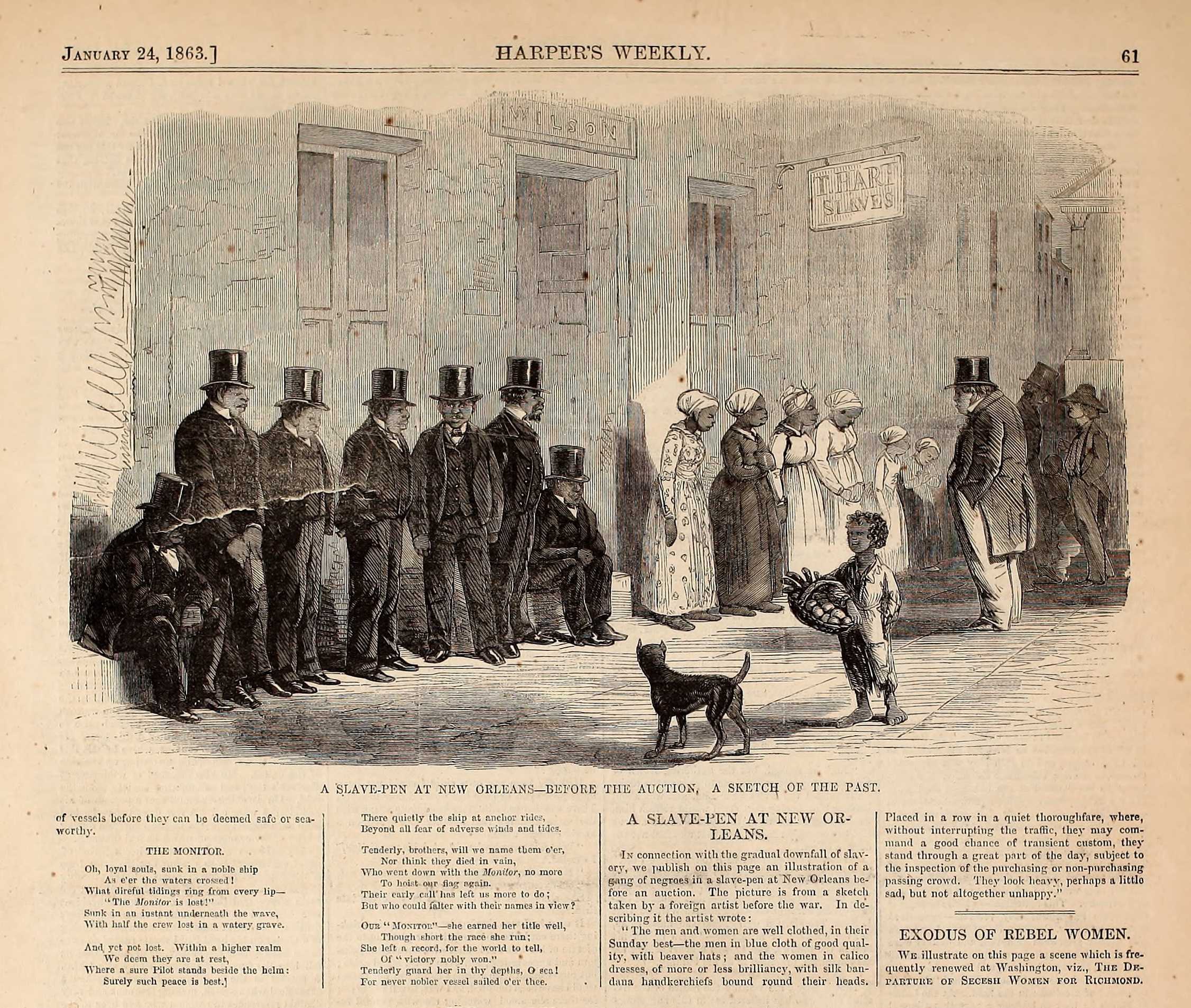
"A Slave Pen at New Orleans—Before the Auction, a Sketch of the Past" (Harper's Weekly, January 24, 1863)

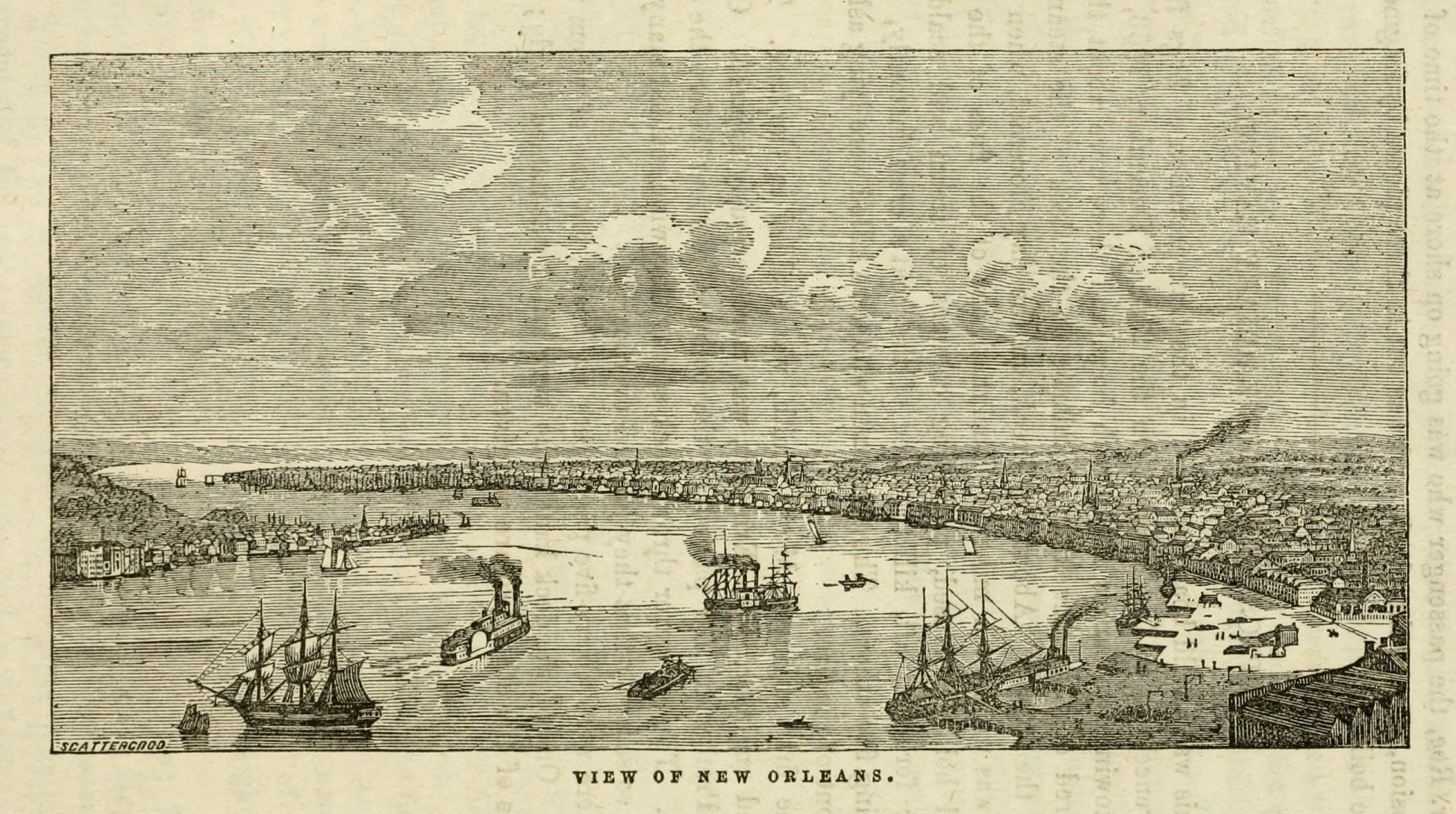
View of the Port at New Orleans, circa 1855, etching from Lloyd's Steamboat Directory

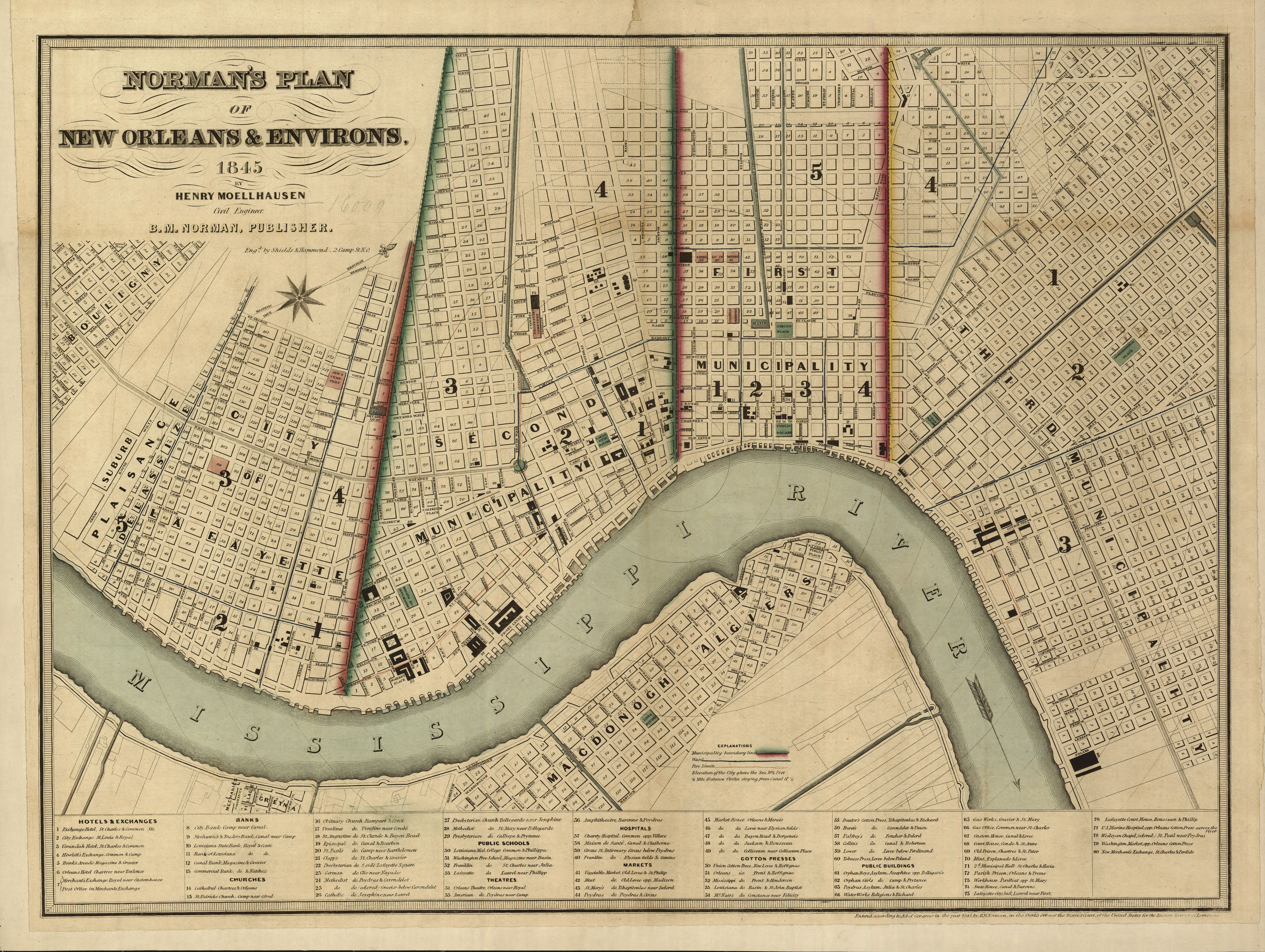
1845 map of New Orleans; the trade was ubiquitous throughout the city but especially brisk in the major hotels and exchange buildings; by the coming of the Civil War, Baronne, Gravier, Moreau, Esplanade, Camp and other streets in what is now the Central Business District were lined with slave marts

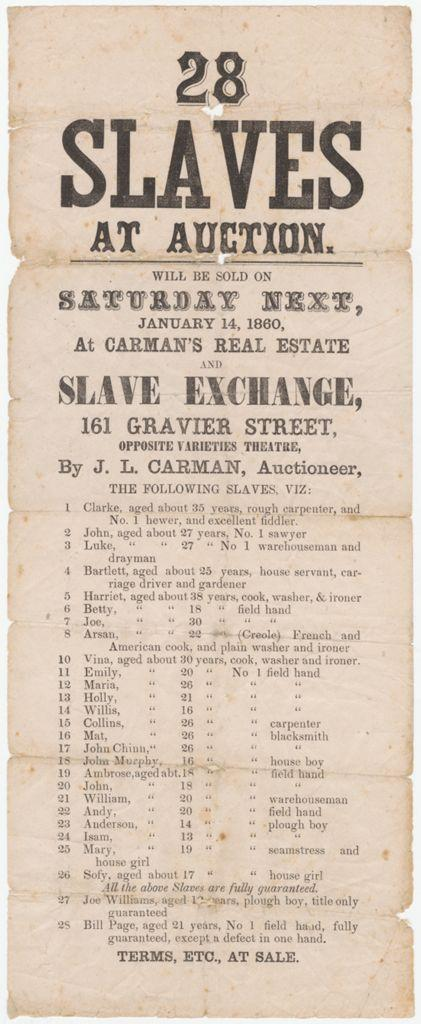
Slave sale broadside (Gail and Stephen Rudin Slavery Collection, Cornell University Libraries)

New Orleans, Louisiana, United States was one of the most important American slave markets of the lower Mississippi River valley from approximately 1830 until the American Civil War. Slaves from the upper south and greater Chesapeake regions of the U.S. were trafficked by land and by sea to New Orleans where they were sold at a markup to the cotton and sugar plantation barons of the region.

== History ==
In the years immediately following the War of 1812, the most active slave markets in the Deep South of the United States were at Algiers, Louisiana, and Natchez, Mississippi. One New Orleans historian found evidence of that "the mistress of the trade", as New Orleans was later known, was open for business in the first years of the 19th century, but "it was not till the 1820s had well set in that the number of American slave merchants grew to impressive proportions" and by 1827 "New Orleans had become the chief center of the slave trade in the lower South" Recent research has found that New Orleans was also a key "regional transshipment port to smaller cities on the Gulf Coast," including Galveston in the Republic of Texas, Mobile, Bay St. Louis, and Tampa Bay.

Interviewed in 1896, at age 91, E. Wood Perry Sr. (father of the artist E. Wood Perry Jr.) recalled that,

[i]n 1839, when I arrived here, the corner of St. Charles and Union streets was occupied by Freret's cotton compress, on the site now occupled by the Masonic Temple. Another cotton press was at the corner of Carondelet and Gravier, and on Magazine street, near Poydras, was still another. Gravier street as far out as Dryades was held by the slave traders. Large stocks of slaves were kept on hand, the creatures being selected and purchased just as any other commodity. The great auction mart in those days, where real estate and slaves indifferently were sold under the crier's hammer, was Bank's Arcade. Later on the cotton presses were removed to Freret street and points above St. Mary's Market, near the levee, while the slave traders moved down town, about Esplanade street, where Long strings of slaves were exhibited on the sidewalks dally.

By the 1850s the city had what was essentially a dedicated "slave district" that was "dominated by traders' pens and offices: in 1854, there were no fewer than seven slave dealers in a single block on Gravier, while on a single square on Moreau Street there was a row of eleven particularly commodious slave pens." A lady of New Orleans wrote that her doubts about the colonization scheme were fueled by the profitability of the slave supply chain that stretched across the South: "But alas! while we can see from one of our broadest! streets suspended from the tops of the houses across the street a pennon bearing in large letters this inscription—Talbot's Slave Depot—with the lower floor filled with men and women for sale— specimens of them at the doors— and the very high prices which these victims now command — we fear that Virginia and the other exporting States will send down more slaves for Talbot than free men for Liberia."

As Frederic Bancroft put it in his Slave-Trading in the Old South:

Nowhere else, except next to the Exchange in Charleston and in the marketplace in Montgomery, was slave-trading on a large scale so conspicuous. In New Orleans it sought public attention: slave-auctions were regularly held in its two grand hotels besides other public places; and in much frequented streets there were slave-depots, show-rooms, show-windows, broad verandas and even neighborhoods where gayly dressed slaves were prominently exhibited. In New Orleans, markets and buyers were most numerous, money was most plentiful, profits were largest. Slave-trading there had a peculiar dash: it rejoiced in its display and prosperity; it felt unashamed, almost proud.

The New Orleans slave market was closed in 1864 by the United States Army: "By order of Major General Banks, all the 'signs' of the slave-pens or auctions were erased. The names of Hatch's [sic], Foster's, Wilson's, Campbell's, have disappeared from their respective houses. Campbell's slave pen is a rebel-prison. 'Got in dar ye-self,' a black woman said, as she saw the rebel prisoners tiling into the old pen. 'Use' to put us dar! Gos dar ye-self now. De Lord's comin'.' A few of the old slave-traders remain, gliding about like ghosts, and wasting away daily in the uncongenial atmosphere of freedom."

== Slave dealers ==
Traders listed in the 1846 New Orleans city directory:

- Boudar Thomas negro trader 11 Moreau St.
- Chriswell, E. negro trader, Circus b. Gravier and Perdido streets
- Davis, Marc negro trader 14 Moreau st.
- Donevan & Wilson, negro traders 56 Esplanade st.
- Hagan, John negro trader, c. Esplanade and Moreau st.
- Hite, S. N. negro trader 100 Union st. 2 m.
- Lockett, Edward negro trader 18 Moreau st.
- Peterson & Stewart, negro traders c. Common and Franklin streets.
- Slatter, Henry negro trader c. Esplanade and Moreau sts
- White, J. R. negro trader Union n. St. Charles st. (Note: Unclear if this is John R. White, the slave trader from Missouri, or John R. White, the slave trader from Virginia.)
- Williams, H. William negro trader 58 Esplanade st.
- Williams, W. B. negro trader 117 Perdido St.

Traders listed in the 1861 New Orleans city directory:

- Andrius Henry, 195 Gravier
- Boazman J. W. 166 Gravier
- Bruin Joseph, Esplanade c. Chartres
- Campbell Walter L. 54 Baronne
- Elam R. H. 58 Baronne
- Foster Thomas, 76 and 78 Baronne
- Hatcher Charles F. 195 Gravier
- Johnston Theodore, 8 Moreau
- Lilly A. 48 Baronne
- Long R. W. 161 Gravier
- Loftin E. 169 Gravier.
- Matthews Thos. E. Esplanade c. Chartres
- Peterson H. F. 8 late 15 Perdido
- Poindexter & Little, 48 Baronne
- Rutherford C. M. 68 Baronne
- Smith John B. 90 Baronne
- Weisemann A. 177 Gravier
- Wilson J. M. Gravier c. Baronne

== See also ==
- History of New Orleans
- St. Charles Hotel, New Orleans
- St. Louis Hotel
- Verandah Hotel
- City Hotel (New Orleans)
- Banks' Arcade
- Exchange Alley
- United States Custom House (New Orleans)
- List of streets of New Orleans
- History of slavery in Louisiana
- Forks of the Road slave market
- Richmond, Virginia slave market
- Hamburg, South Carolina slave market
- Nashville, Tennessee slave market
- List of slave traders of the United States
