= C. M. Rutherford =

American slave trader (c. 1810–aft. 1866)

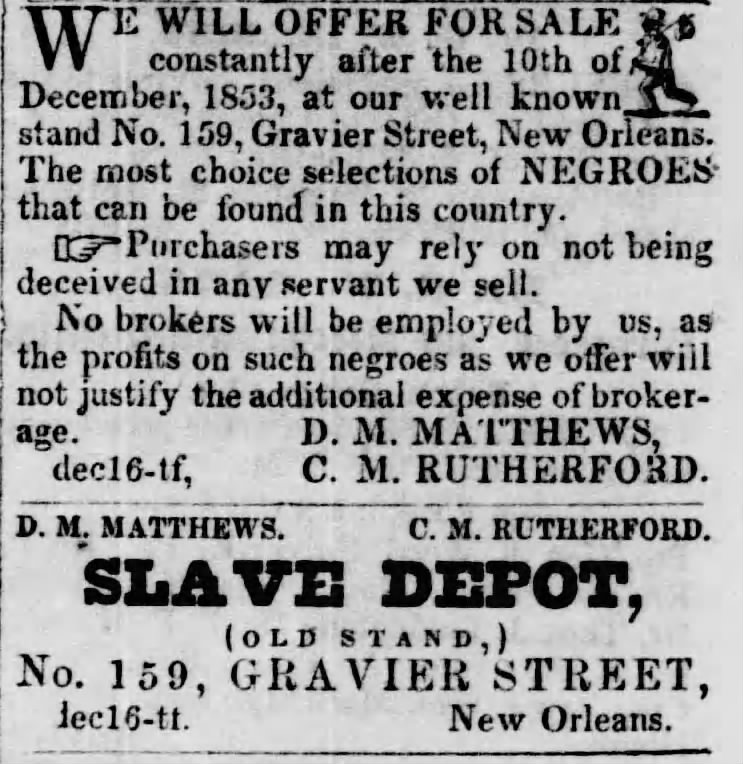
- Baton Rouge Daily Gazette and Comet, Dec. 16, 1853
- Born: c. 1810; Virginia, U.S.
- Died: after 1866; Unknown
- Occupation: Slave trader

Calvin Morgan Rutherford (born c. 1810, died after 1866), generally known as C. M. Rutherford, was a 19th-century American interstate slave trader. Rutherford had a wide geographic reach, trading nationwide from the Old Dominion of Virginia to as far west as Texas. Rutherford had ties to former Franklin & Armfield associates, worked in Kentucky for several years, advertised to markets throughout Louisiana and Mississippi, and was a major figure in the New Orleans slave trade for at least 20 years. Rutherford also invested his money in steamboats and hotels.

== Life and work ==
=== Early years and family ===
C. M. Rutherford was a son of Randolph (Raudle) and Polly Rutherford from Wythe County, Virginia. He listed his birthplace as Virginia in both the 1850 and 1860 census, and reported ages to the census enumerators that would place his birthdate between 1804 and 1815. A doctor who claimed him as a reference declared that Rutherford was cured of his anal fistula in summer 1845, when he was age 35, which puts Rutherford's birthyear around 1810.

=== 1830s ===
Rutherford was seemingly drawn to the newly opened "southwest" following the Indian Removal Act of 1830. In 1837 he paid $1.25 an acre for 80 acres of land near the Mississippi River that had been ceded by the Choctaw to the U.S. government under the Treaty of Dancing Rabbit Creek, in what eventually became Bolivar County. There was a letter waiting for Rutherford at the Vicksburg, Mississippi post office in February 1838.

=== 1840s ===
Rutherford's slave trading business was funded in part by Rice C. Ballard, who had once been a partner in the pioneering interstate slave-trading company Franklin & Armfield. According to the history The Ledger and The Chain: How Domestic Slave Traders Shaped America (2021), Ballard invested his wealth with Rutherford even though he himself had quit the retail side of the human-trafficking business:

Rutherford sometimes bought enslaved people upon request for Ballard and Boyd's labor camps, disposed of people they wished to discard, and scouted for people he thought they would find useful or desirable. Much of Ballard's relationship with Rutherford, however, replicated Ballard's early relationship with Samuel Alsop. Funneling money through Louisville banks and providing lines of credit on his New Orleans merchants, Ballard fronted Rutherford's slave trading and took part of the proceeds...On gross sales that were the modern equivalent of several million dollars annually and brought profits of about 30 percent, he also provided Ballard with a healthy return on his stake in Rutherford's business.

Rutherford was in New Orleans by 1841 when there was a letter waiting for him at the post office there. Rutherford had once been trading partners with a man called J. Andrews but the two announced in the New Orleans newspaper in February 1841 that they were no longer in business together. Meanwhile, land that Rutherford had once owned in Vicksburg, Mississippi was being put up for sale by the Warren County sheriff to cover back taxes from 1841 and 1842. In 1842, a Claiborne County, Mississippi planter named William Lile sought the return of an enslaved man named Moses who had set himself free. Moses, who had been purchased from C. M. Rutherford on June 29, 1841, was 21 years old, stood about 6 ft 0 in (1.83 m) tall, and "had a gun-shot mark on his back." Also missing was Jack, who had whip marks on his back and "the end of his nose bit off." Rutherford appears in the New Orleans city directory for 1842 at the address 20 Moreau Street. He wrote in a letter of December 1842 that he would be in New Orleans for the next six months, which gives a suggestion of seasonality of the U.S. interstate slave trade in general and Rutherford's annual peregrinations in particular. In 1843, Rutherford sold four boys aged 12 and 13 named Abram, Samuel, John, and Charles to William A. Powell, a planter of the Red River valley, for $1,562.50. In 1844, there were letters waiting for Rutherford at the post offices of Louisville, Kentucky, and Natchez, Mississippi. According to a series of legal filings made in Kentucky in the 1850s, "Calvin M. Rutherford states that, "'in the fall 1844,' he, William H. Kelly and Stephen R. Chenowith 'formed a copartnership for the purchase and sale of negro slaves which copartnership continued till the Summer of 1846.' The endeavor was sued on various occasions for selling slaves that were unsound or were in fact free. Rutherford claims that he paid some of these damages 'out of his own individual funds.' Seeking a ruling 'on the unsettled matters' stated in his petition, Rutherford prays 'a decree be made in plffs favor for such sum as he may be equitably entitled to.'" U.S. customs department records show that in 1846 Rutherford shipped 16 slaves from Virginia ports to New Orleans.

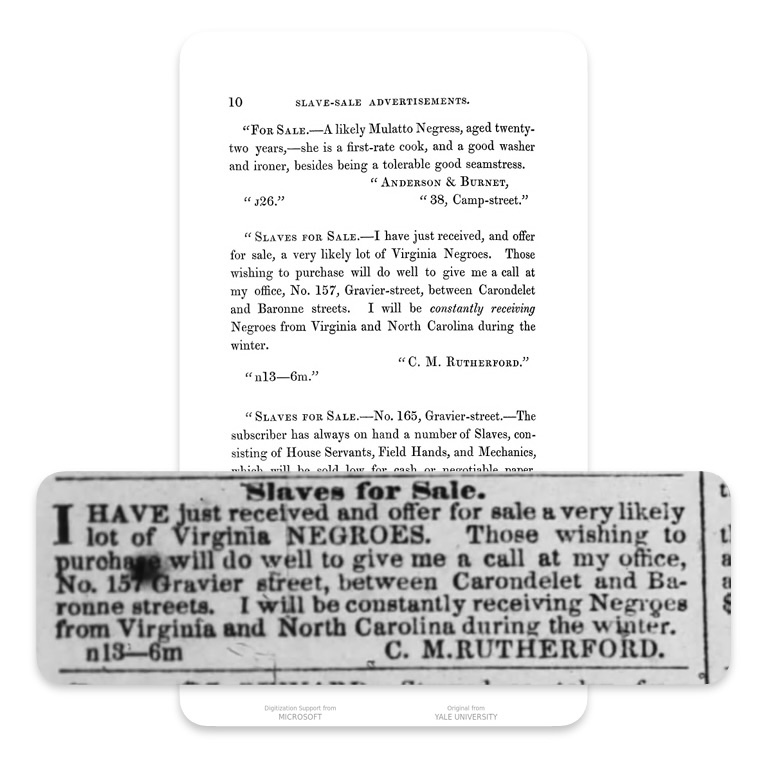
"I have just received for sale a very likely lot of Virginia NEGROES."

A slave-depot advertisement placed by Rutherford in the January 26, 1847 issue of the New Orleans Times-Picayune was noticed by a British traveler named Ebenezer Davies and republished in his 1849 book, American Scenes and Christian Slavery: A Recent Tour of Four Thousand Miles in the United States. On April 28, 1847, Rutherford sold a slave to a woman named Henrietta Waters Ross.

Rutherford was listed in the 1848–49 city directory of Louisville, Kentucky as a resident who boarded at the Louisville Hotel. As of 1848, Rutherford advertised to potential buyers in New Orleans, Memphis, and Natchez, Mississippi that he had slaves for sale that had been newly trafficked from Virginia and North Carolina.

=== 1850s ===
C. M. Rutherford was enumerated by censustakers as a resident of Louisville, Kentucky in June 1850, occupation slave dealer. In 1850 an enslaved man named Madison alias Matt was seized from C. M. Rutherford by the sheriff of New Orleans as the consequence of a lawsuit and sold "in the rotunda of the City Exchange" to James McMasters for $500.

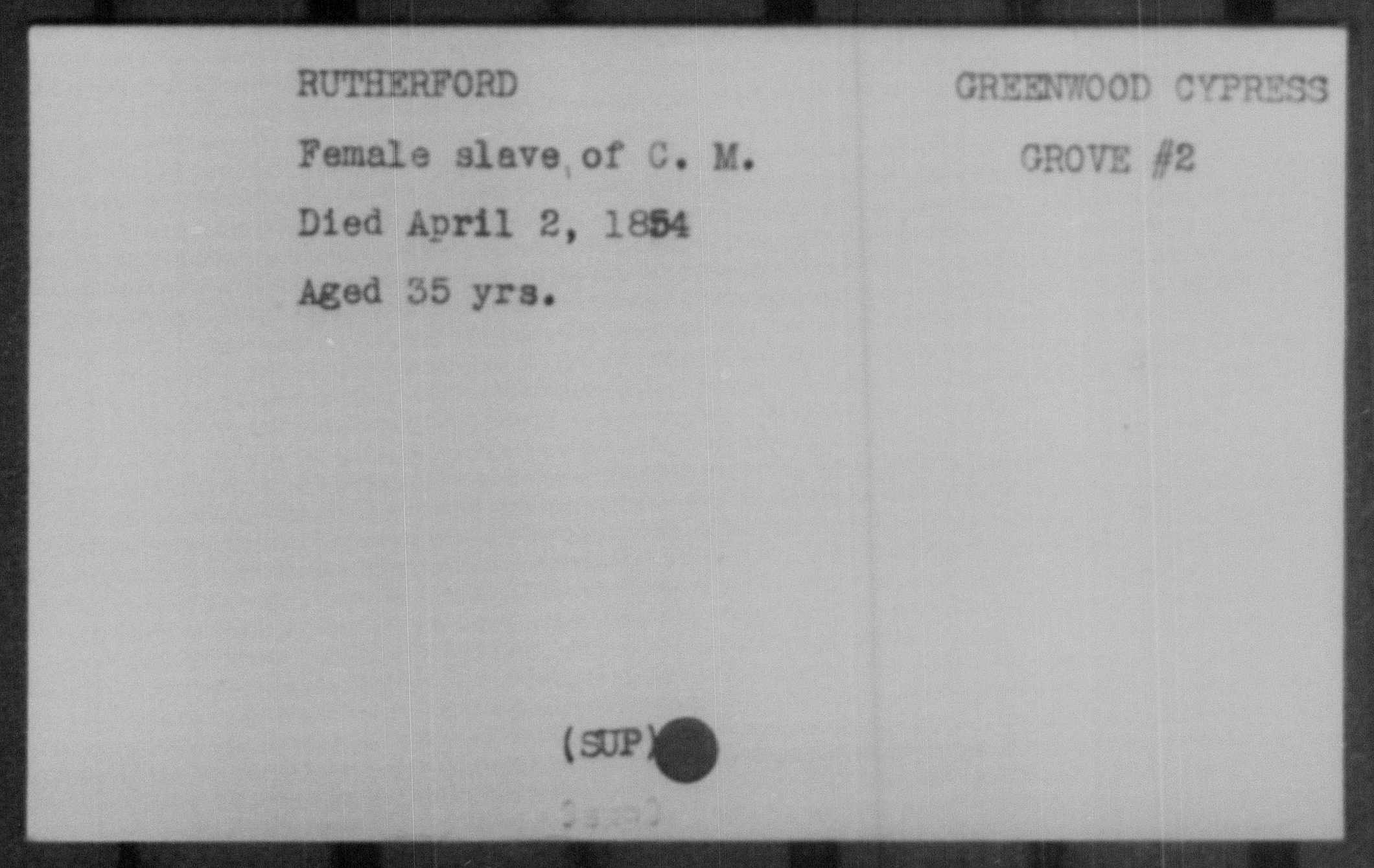
Index card for a New Orleans death record, 1854

In January 1851, Rutherford testified at a pre-trial hearing regarding the death by violence of Theodore P. Byrd in the barroom of New Orleans' Verandah Hotel. Rutherford was present in the room when William H. Evington allegedly stabbed Byrd. According to the Times-Picayune, Rutherford "saw several persons try to separate the combatants. Saw Byrd step back toward the bar, and heard him say, 'I am stabbed twice.' Saw a knife falling from the hand and near the prisoner. The prisoner several times told witness that he had stabbed and killed Byrd, that he was perfectly justifiable for it, and that if he had to do it over he should do it again.'" A few days later, Rutherford advertised that he had for sale, three "superior" blacksmiths, two seamstresses, and a number of field hands. According to Frederic Bancroft, Rutherford was among the most visible shippers or consignees operating in the interstate slave trade in 1851–52. Per Bancroft in Slave-Trading in the Old South, Rutherford, Thomas Foster, and C. F. Hatcher "belonged to a class that, theoretically at least, preferred the usual two and one-half per cent commission for buying or selling for others. They sought slaves of all kinds, and each had a jail and a yard." In 1852 Rutherford was advertising slaves imported from Virginia and Kentucky, and that "Planters are particularly requested to call at 159 Gravier street." In July of that year, Rutherford offered a $5 reward for the return of a six-year-old mulatto boy named Levi Franklin; he had been wearing white cotton clothing when he went missing.

Rutherford is perhaps best known today to scholars of American slavery for his role in selling Virginia Boyd, an enslaved pregnant woman who had been legal property of S. S. Boyd, a wealthy lawyer who lived in Natchez, Mississippi and invested in plantations in partnership with Rice C. Ballard. On May 6, 1853, Virginia Boyd wrote a letter from within a slave jail, asking Ballard to intervene to prevent her sale by order of Boyd. The letter suggested that S. S. Boyd had fathered one or more of her children, and asked for help. Help was not forthcoming. Rutherford "sent a letter to Ballard on August 8 announcing that Virginia and one of her children had indeed been sold, but the oldest child had not." Rutherford did another deal with Texas slavers when an enslaved man named Frank was shipped from the Lone Star State to New Orleans. Frank was hired out to do work in the city, and had a 10-day bout with yellow fever during which time he was put in a "private room" for the sick at Rutherford's jail. Also in 1853, Rutherford was quoted as a reliable witness to the steamboat race between Eclipse and Shotwell, to see which ship could get from New Orleans to Louisville at a record speed. The Eclipse–Shotwell contest has been called the "most famous steamboat race before the Civil War," and Rutherford's perceived credibility may have been due in part to the strong association between the slave trade and riverine steamship traffic. As historian Robert Gudmestad wrote:

Calvin M. Rutherford, a slave dealer based in New Orleans, used steamers to communicate within his burgeoning commercial empire. He dispatched letters on steamers to his various agents, instructing them about buying slaves and arranging for financial backing. Rutherford then waited in New Orleans for the arrival of the new purchases, who might be shipped down the river for only $3. On at least one occasion he used a steamboat to retrieve a slave from an unsatisfied buyer. Steamers, in short, were a quick and efficient way to coordinate the commerce in human beings.

In 1854, Rutherford advertised that he had another blacksmith for sale. Skilled mechanical tradesmen were among the most in-demand, highest-priced slaves on the market, so blacksmiths were most likely a high-profit item for slave traders like Rutherford.

In 1855, Calvin M. Rutherford sued fellow slave trader Lewis C. Robards over the dispensation of a 36-year-old enslaved woman named Emily, who was said to be worth $500. Rutherford alleged that "[Emily] had been sent to Robards' jail to be sold at a fixed price, but no sale had been made and the defendant refused to return her to the plaintiff. Rutherford asked for the delivery of Emily plus a fee of $50 for damage and detention. The court ordered Emily to be delivered to Rutherford, and each party was to pay his own court costs." (Note: For more on Lewis C. Robards, a slave trader with an unusually unsavory reputation, see J. Winston Coleman's Slavery Times in Kentucky (1940).)

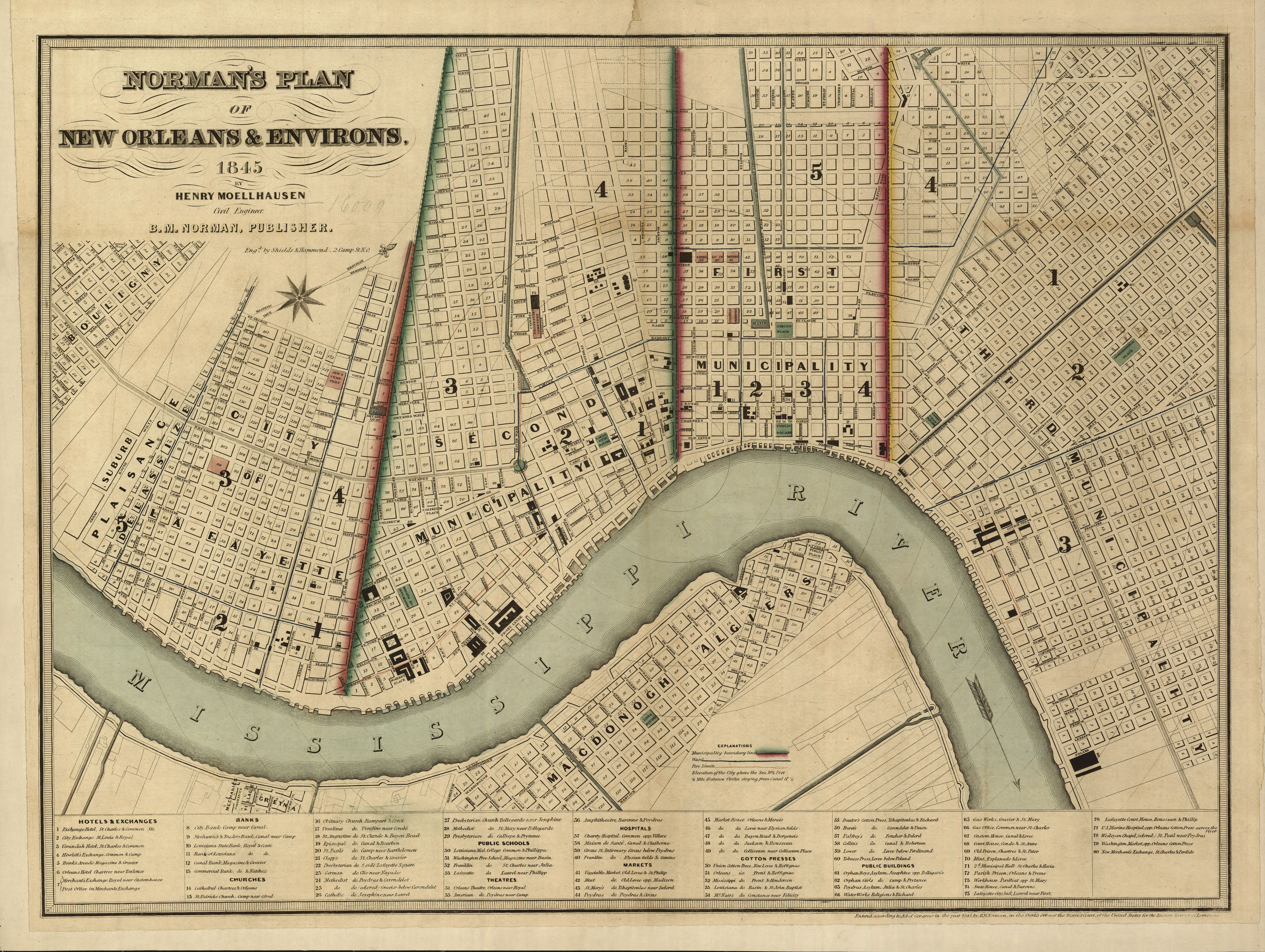
Rutherford worked out of the Arcade Passage in the Second Municipality of New Orleans in the late 1850s. Norman's plan of New Orleans & environs, 1845 (LOC 98687133)

By 1857, Rutherford had moved his New Orleans depot again, working out of the Arcade Passage near Natchez Street.

In January 1857, Rutherford advertised a $50 reward for the return of John of Natchez, a very intelligent blacksmith who had been wearing a blue satinett suit, and a black hat, and who was likely to try to take a boat out of the city. In April 1857 Rutherford was importing cotton field hands, blacksmiths, and carpenters from South Carolina.

On May 17, 1858, Rutherford bought a little more than 277 acres of land from the U.S. government for 25¢ an acre. Rutherford's advertised slave auctions of May 1857 included a man named Dick, to be sold by order of the First District Court of New Orleans; and an assortment of other human beings including a "good steamboat hand" named Bob and two children, Jane, aged five, and Lenora, age two. Later the same month, C. M. Rutherford & Co. was established in partnership with a trader named Spencer Crewell from Savannah, Georgia. Just four months later, in September 1857, Rutherford and his new partner R. W. Long offered "ample quarters for 150 slaves at 117 Carolondet Street." The partnership with Long continued through at least November, with their advertisements listing multiple slaves for sale at auction. Rutherford and Long were listed as partners in an auction business in the 1858 New Orleans city directory. (Note: It is unclear if Rutherford was legally or financially involved with Long when John T. Hatcher killed Eudora at Long's Gravier Street "negro yard" in December 1858.) The following year, 1859, Rutherford seemed to be a sole proprietor again, and had more than 150 slaves for sale at his depot at 68 Baronne. This churn was the normal course of business for Rutherford, who seemingly had a dense network of trading partners including, according to historian Joshua D. Rothman, "Stephen Chenoweth, Samuel Tompkins, Thomas Hundley, J. M. Martin, Samuel B. Conrey, and D. M. Matthews." Rutherford sent two slaves to be treated at the Hôtel-Dieu hospital in New Orleans between 1859 and 1864.

=== 1860s ===
At the time of the 1860 U.S. census, Rutherford's occupation was listed as "slave depot", he had a personal estate valued at $5,000, and he shared a household with James Freeman and William Bailey, both "dealers in slaves." Rutherford's last known newspaper classified advertisement listing slaves for sale was published January 14, 1861.

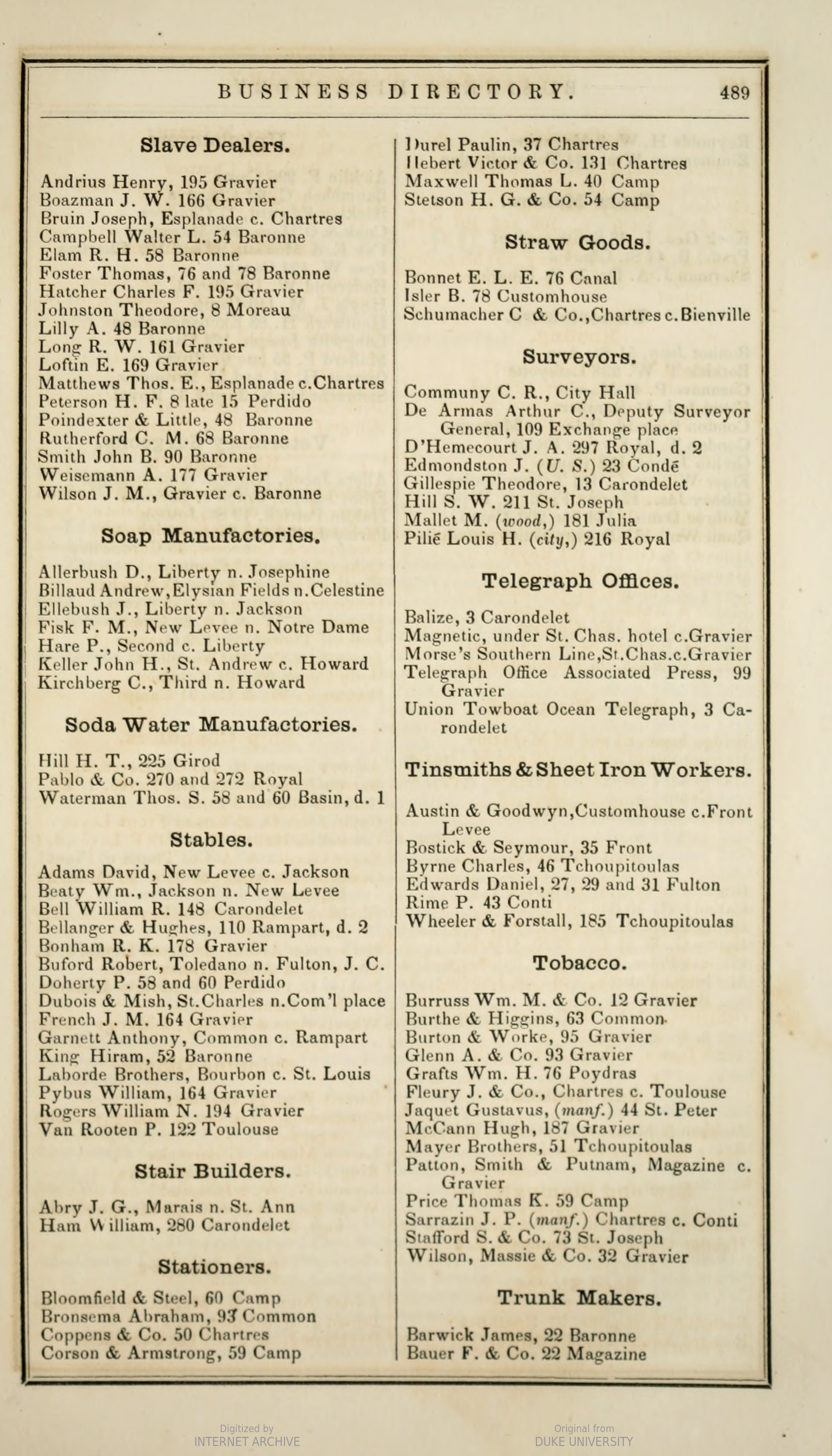
Slave dealers listed in the 1861 directory of New Orleans, Louisiana, including Rutherford, Walter L. Campbell, R. H. Elam, Poindexter & Little, and J. M. Wilson

After the American Civil War, Rutherford was listed in the 1866 New Orleans city directory as a resident living at the corner of Water and Ninth. In 1868 a debt of Rutherford's in the amount of $2,678.93 was listed for auction in New Orleans.

=== Hotels, steamboats, and the U.S. Supreme Court ===
In addition to his work buying and selling people as livestock, Rutherford invested in real property. In 1849, Rutherford bought the Colonel Stanton from the U.S. government. Colonel Stanton was a "138 53/95 tons" 97-foot-long steam propeller ship with "one deck, three masts, square stern, billethead." In January 1850, there was a collision between the Colonel Stanton (while she was being towed by the Diana), and the steamer Ohio. The Colonel Stanton sank and was lost; there were no casualties as a result of the incident. There were, however, lawsuits, that ultimately involved such legal luminaries of the south as Reverdy Johnson and Judah P. Benjamin. The dispute was not resolved once and for all until 17 years later when in 1867 the U.S. Supreme Court rendered a decision on the admissibility of certain depositions.

In 1855 C. M. Rutherford was an investor in the National Hotel of Louisville, Kentucky. The hotel also served as one of the city's slave markets.

== See also ==
- List of American slave traders
- History of slavery in Louisiana
- History of slavery in Kentucky
- Slave markets and slave jails in the United States
- Bibliography of the slave trade in the United States
- Category:Franklin & Armfield
