= John Hatcher =

John Hatcher may refer to:

- John Hatcher (Cambridge) (d. 1587), Regius Professor of Physic and Vice-Chancellor of Cambridge University
- John Hatcher (commissioner) (1634–1678), English local official in Lincolnshire, member of parliament for part of 1660
- John Bell Hatcher (1861–1904), American paleontologist
- John T. Hatcher, American slave trader
