= The 431 Exchange =

Nonprofit organization in USA

The 431 Exchange is a 501(c)(3) nonprofit organization that focuses on adult education and social justice advocacy. It is based in Louisiana.

== History ==
431 Exchange was founded by Jeanne and Jeff Geoffray, descendants of Alice Geoffray, who established the Adult Education Center (AEC) in New Orleans. From 1965 to 1972, the AEC operated on Exchange Place, providing vocational training to 431 women. Graduates of the program became some of the first Black secretaries in multinational corporations and local businesses in New Orleans, contributing to the integration of the workforce and the advancement of equal employment opportunities in the Southern United States.

== Scholarships ==
431 Exchange grants scholarships named, The 431 Exchange Scholarship, to students pursuing continuing or vocational education. Applicants are required to submit an essay about an individual who has influenced their academic path.

== Management ==
Most of the board of directors at 431 Exchange are graduates of the Adult Education Center.
