= Exchange Place =

Exchange Place may refer to:

- Exchange Place (New Orleans), pedestrian mall in Louisiana
- Exchange Place (Boston), office building complex in Massachusetts
- Exchange Place, Jersey City, district and neighborhood in New Jersey
  - Exchange Place station (PATH), metro station
  - Exchange Place station (Pennsylvania Railroad), former terminal
  - Exchange Place station (Hudson–Bergen Light Rail)
- Exchange Place (Manhattan), street in New York City
- Exchange Place Historic District, Salt Lake City, Utah
