= City Hotel (New Orleans) =

Historic structure (1832–1888)

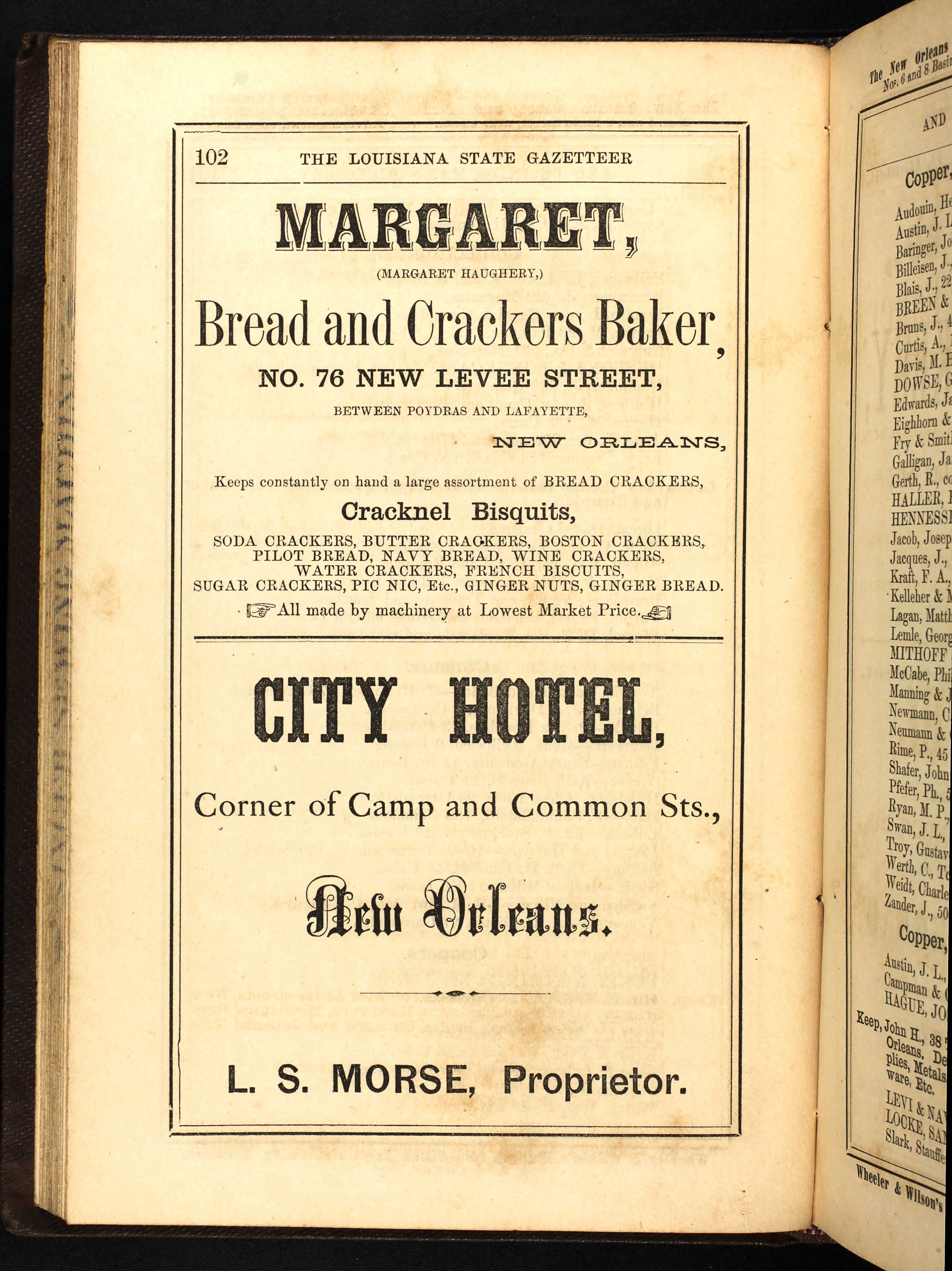
City Hotel of New Orleans in 1861 city directory

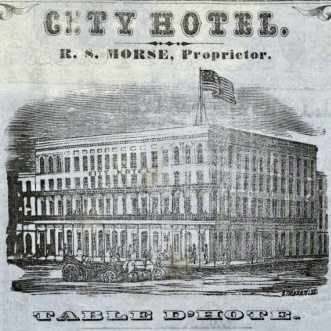
Image of the City Hotel around 1857 from a dinner menu (University of Houston Libraries)

The City Hotel in New Orleans, Louisiana, United States, located at the intersection of Camp and Common Streets, was one of the city's major antebellum hotels, but maybe not quite so storied as the older, larger, St. Louis and St. Charles Hotels. As explained by a city historian in 1922, the "social life of New Orleans revolved around its great hotels to a degree greater than was the case, probably, in other American city." As was the case with the St. Charles and the St. Louis, slave auctions were held at the City Hotel before the American Civil War.

== History ==
The four-story City Hotel was designed by Charles Zimpel, built in 1832 and was originally known as Bishop's Hotel and then as Richardson's Hotel before it became the City Hotel around 1839–1840. The City Hotel was owned and operated for many years by a man named Ruggles S. Morse who had come to New Orleans from Portland, Maine. When the Verandah Hotel burned in 1855, business increased at the City Hotel. During the war Ruggles provided extensive medical supplies and equipment for the benefit of victims of the 1862 Ponchatoula train wreck who were being treated the marine hospital.

Under Ruggles the hotel was especially favored by Texans, steamboat men, and railroad men. Control of the hotel was transferred in 1874 by Col. Morse to W. T. Mumford and Ed. Watson." The City Hotel was demolished in 1888. The Baldwin building was then built on the same site.

== See also ==
- New Orleans slave market
- History of slavery in Louisiana
- Banks' Arcade
