= Charles F. Hatcher =

Charles F. Hatcher may refer to:

- C. F. Hatcher (~1814–1869), American slave trader
- Charles Hatcher (politician) (1939–2026), U.S. Congressman
