= Charles Hatcher =

Charles Hatcher may refer to:

- C. F. Hatcher (~1814–1869), American slave trader
- Edwin Starr (born Charles Edwin Hatcher; 1942–2003), American singer
- Charlie Hatcher (born 1958), American politician from Tennessee
- Charles Ray Hatcher (1929–1984), American serial killer
- Charles Floyd Hatcher (1939–2026), American politician from Georgia
