= Hartcher =

Hartcher is a surname. Notable people with the surname include:

- Chris Hartcher (born 1946), Australian politician
- Kaden Hartcher Australian actor who appeared in Informer 3838
- Peter Hartcher (born 1963), Australian journalist

== See also ==
- Hatcher
