= Charles Frederick Zimpel =

Prussian-born engineer-architect and cartographer (1801–1879)

Charles Friedrich Zimpel
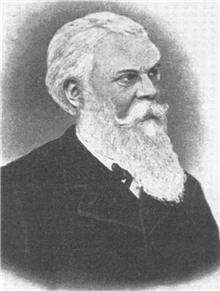
- Born: Carl Friedrich Zimpel; December 11, 1801; Szprotawa, Prussia (later Germany, now Poland)
- Died: June 26, 1879 (aged 77)
- Other names: Karl Friedrich Zimpel, Charles Franz Zimpel
- Occupations: Engineer; Architect; Surveyor; Cartographer

Charles Friedrich Zimpel (December 11, 1801 – June 26, 1879), also known as Carl Friedrich Zimpel and Charles Franz Zimpel, was a Prussian-born engineer, architect, surveyor and cartographer. He worked in New Orleans, Louisiana, in the 1830s, where he designed several buildings and produced a detailed 1834 map of the city and its vicinity. He later prepared an 1864 plan for a proposed railway from Jaffa to Jerusalem. In particular, he designed the Bishop's City Hotel in 1831, the Bank of Orleans in 1832, as well as the Banks Arcade and the Orleans Cotton Press in 1833.

== Biography ==
Zimpel probably came to New Orleans as the surveyor and engineer for the course of the New Orleans and Carrollton Railroad (now the St. Charles Avenue streetcar line); also spent the years 1831–1832 compiling surveys for the production of the map Topographical Map of New Orleans and Its Vicinity..., which he had engraved in Prussia, probably his native country. The map includes the first survey of the town of Carrollton (now the upper limits of New Orleans) done by Zimpel. In 1834, he is listed as deputy city surveyor and engineer. Zimpel was the architect for four New Orleans buildings, all designed and built in the 1830s: the Bank of Orleans, Banks Arcade, Bishop's City Hotel, and Orleans Cotton Press. He also remodeled the Charity Hospital building as the State House. Zimpel left New Orleans by the late 1830s.

By 1864, he was in Constantinople, where as Ingénieur en chef he drew up plans for the proposed Jaffa to Jerusalem railway line.

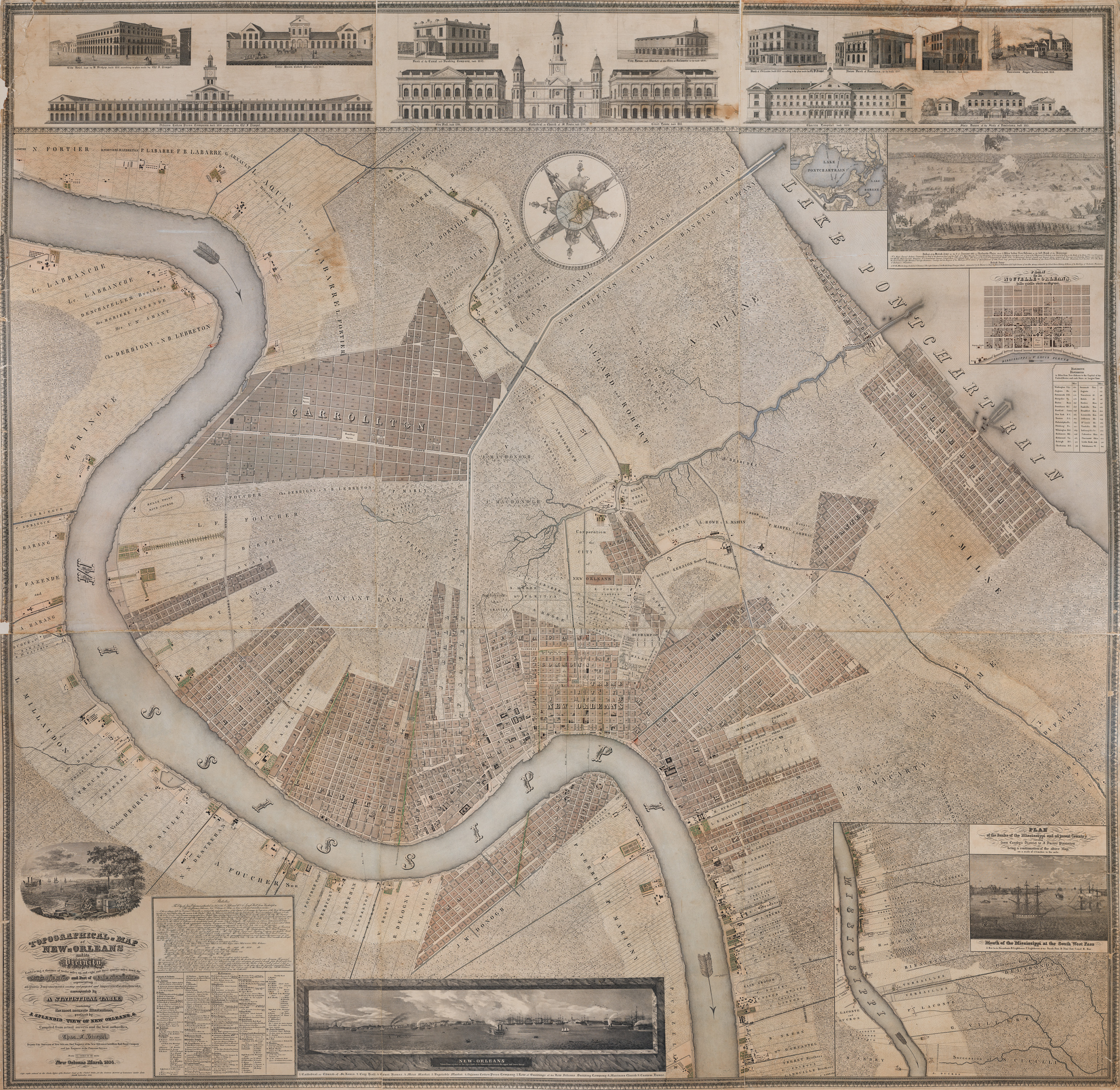
Zimpel's 1834 map of New Orleans

He created a map of Carrollton, New Orleans in 1832 and a map of New Orleans in 1834.

== Sources ==
- J.A.M. Sources: Louisiana Courier, November 30, 1833, February 20, 1836; New Orleans Bee, February 20, 1836; Friends of the Cabildo, New Orleans Architecture, vol. II: The American Sector (1972); Benjamin Moore Norman, Norman's New Orleans and Environs; Benjamin Henry Latrobe, Impressions Respecting New Orleans, ed. by Samuel Wilson, Jr. (1951); John Smith Kendall, History of New Orleans, II (1922).
- Constantinople source: PLAN d‘un chemin de fer de JAFFA A JERUSALEM par Dr. Chas. F. Zimpel, Ingénieur en chef, Constantinople, October 1864.
