= John R. White =

American slave trader (~1799–1872)

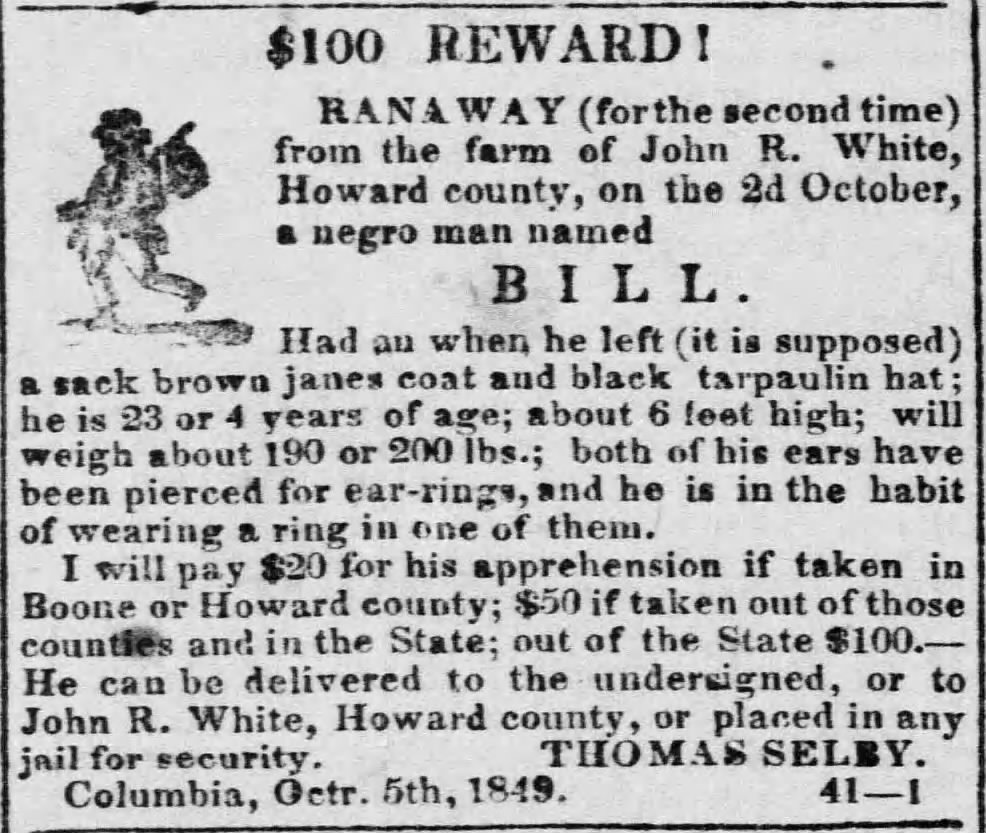
- "$100 Reward" Columbia Herald-Statesman, October 5, 1849
- Born: c. 1799; Kentucky, U.S.
- Died: 1872; Missouri, U.S.
- Other names: J. R. White, Colonel White, Col. White
- Occupations: Slave trader, plantation owner
- Years active: 1844–1860

John Rucker White (c. 1799 – 1872) was a plantation owner, farmer, and interstate slave trader working out of the U.S. state of Missouri in the 25 years prior to the American Civil War.

He was primarily active in Missouri and Louisiana, but also trafficked in people from Kentucky and Virginia. He has been described as "by far the largest and most successful slave trader who operated in the mid-Missouri area." According to a 1914 history of slavery in Missouri, "John R. White of Howard County was a wealthy planter of good repute who dealt in slaves." Howard County lies along the banks of the Missouri River, a tributary of the Mississippi River, in a section of Missouri known as Little Dixie, which had plantation slavery very much in the style of the Deep South.

There is a "John R. White, Slave Record Book (1846–1860)" in the Chinn Collection of the Missouri Historical Society in St. Louis, from which researchers of slavery garner, "For traders in the lower Mississippi River valley, the most significant development was the arrival of steamboats during the 1820s. Most large traders in that region, such as John White from Missouri, used these vessels to transport the hundreds of Missouri, Kentucky, and Virginia slaves that they and their agents bought each year to Louisiana and other states in the Deep South."

== Biography ==
John Rucker White was born in approximately 1799 in Kentucky. In 1830, White was a resident of Howard County, Missouri, as head of a household of 17 people, including five slaves. In 1840, White lived in Richmond Township, Howard County, in a household of 20, including 13 slaves. White's place may have been located near Salt Creek.

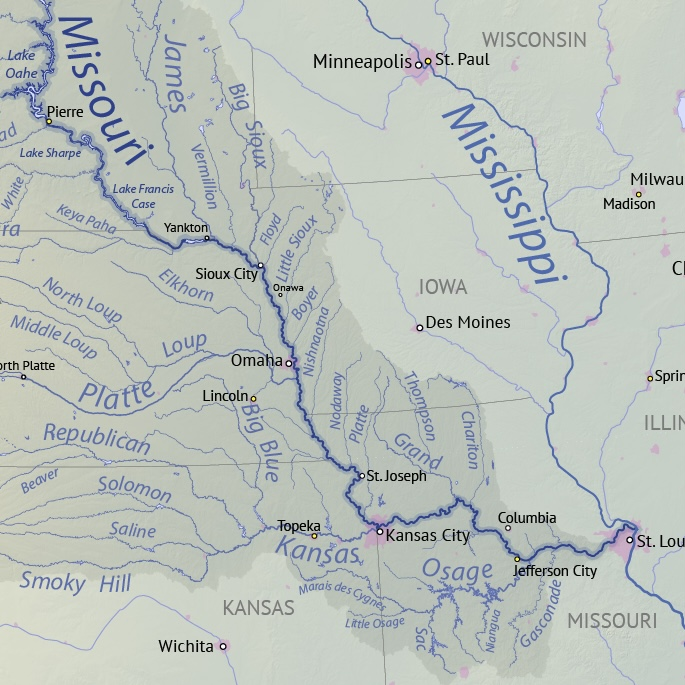
Confluence of Missouri and Mississippi rivers above St. Louis

In 1847, a resident of Lafayette, Louisiana placed an ad in a New Orleans newspaper in hopes of finding a 20-year-old "quateroon girl" named Anna or Hanna Johnson, who was "purchased from Col. J. R. White of this city in December, 1845, who brought her to this city from St. Louis, in the state of Missouri." White may have been trading in New Orleans in partnership with a man named William S. Green sometime before 1848. Circa 1848, White may have been part of a firm called White & Tooly. An ad from this company, italics presumably added by the abolitionist author, appears in William I. Bowditch's Slavery and the Constitution (1849):

The following is taken from the St. Louis Republican: "NEGROES WANTED AND BOARDED. — The highest cash price paid for young likely negroes, at 104, Locust-street, between Third and Fourth, adjoining Gerard's stables. "N.B. Our house will be well secured, and afford the advantages of a jail surrounded by walls, and a basement cell in it. WHITE & Tooly."

In 1849, Thomas Selby of Columbia, Missouri, placed a runaway slave ad describing a man named Bill, who had emancipated himself from White's farm (twice). The nature of Selby and White's professional or personal relationship is unclear, but year prior, according to the 20th-century history Bench and Bar of Boone County, "In 1848, 'Lewis, a free person of color', was prosecuted for 'aiding and assisting in decoying Caroline, a slave, the property of Thomas Selby...Selby was proprietor of Selby's Hotel in Columbia, and Caroline waited on the hotel table. Lewis, who had been liberated by his former master, visited Caroline and told her of the benefits of freedom. So Lewis had to go to jail." There was also a slave trader named William Selby working in the area.

J. R. White from Fayette (the county seat of Howard County) was on the guest register at the Verandah Hotel in New Orleans in May 1850, and "J. R. White, Mo." was at the Verandah again in April 1852. In between, he placed a runaway slave ad seeking to find a six-foot-tall man called Bob who "had a great impediment in his speech." White may have operated a slave depot in New Orleans in 1854 in partnership with Thomas Foster.

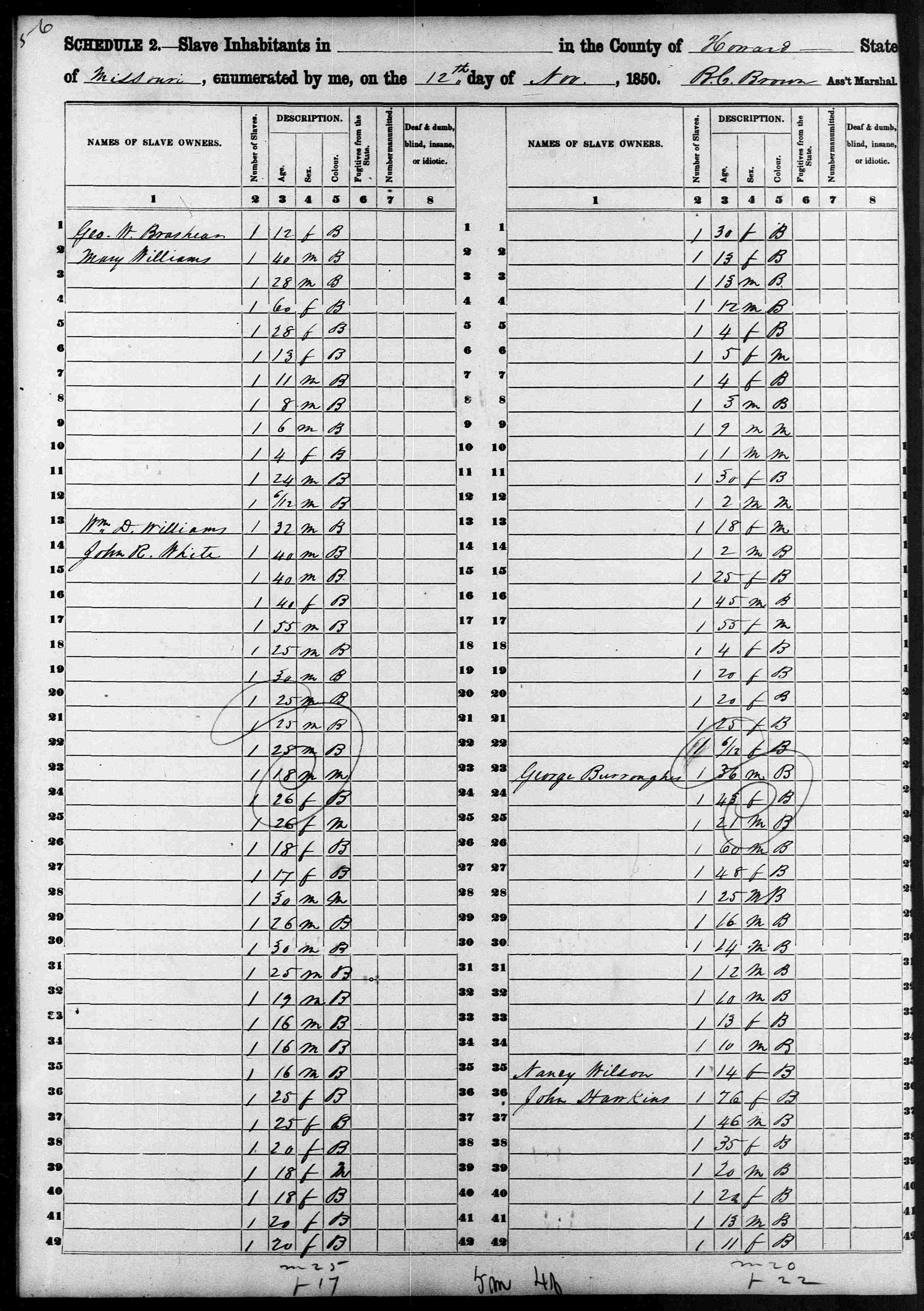
Record-image 58. John R White in Howard County, Missouri, 1850 slave schedules

In 1855 the papers reported that there had been a cholera outbreak in the vicinity of Columbia, Missouri, and that there were "upwards of thirty cases on the farm of Mr. John R. White four miles east of New Franklin, Howard county — one death, a little negro boy. The disease was brought to the farm by a family from St. Louis in which city quite a number of cases have occurred." A month later a doctor visiting White's plantation claimed to have detected arsenic in the coffee and other food and concluded that there was a plot to poison the family, a crime laid to a missing slave.

A runaway slave ad in Louisiana in 1860 sought to recover Sam, who had been purchased from Henry A. Castle who had bought him from Col. John R. White of St. Louis, Mo. At the time of the 1860 U.S. census, White legally enslaved 76 people. In 1864, following the Emancipation Proclamation and the establishment of the U.S. Colored Troops, "Seven of John R. White's slaves—William, Adam, Alfred, Sam, Andy, Preston, and Jacob—all enlisted together at the Fayette [County, Missouri] provost marshal post in the first weeks of January. White was one of Missouri's largest slaveholders; the seven who joined represented a mere tenth of White's holdings, though it signified collective action on the part of a portion of his slaves."

At some point in his trading career, in an example of family separation in American slavery, "John R. White sold a small child to William Quisenberry of Boone County, but sold the mother in Louisiana..."

White died in 1872.

== Negro-Trader White ==
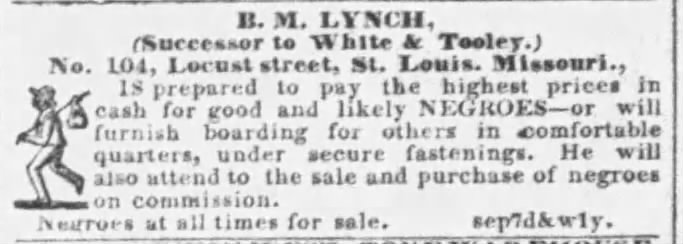
In 1848, slave trader Bernard M. Lynch took over the Locust Street slave pen in St. Louis that had previously been run by White and his partner Tooley; an 1848 ad promised "secure fastenings" for holding slaves ("B. M. Lynch - Successor to White & Tooley" St. Louis Post-Dispatch, September 11, 1848)

There is a figure called Negro-Trader White (or Nigger-Trader White) who appears in the histories of slavery in Missouri and Louisiana. It is not entirely clear that the name refers to John R. White, although Frederic Bancroft seemed to think so. In reverse order of appearance in the histories:

- From a 2000 article about an 1850s slavery case in Louisiana: "The first of the many questions of identity raised by the Morrison case concerns the slave trader whom she sued. He was originally identified in the case as John Rucker White, a slave trader from Howard County, Missouri. Testimony and documents introduced in the case, however, prove that he was James White from Georgia, who owned a slave pen in New Orleans in the 1850s. I take the original mistake to be evidence both of how Alexina Morrison first identified herself when she escaped and of a general local knowledge of the slave trade: She must have identified herself as having run from 'Negro trader White,' and when she did, people thought they knew whom she was talking about."
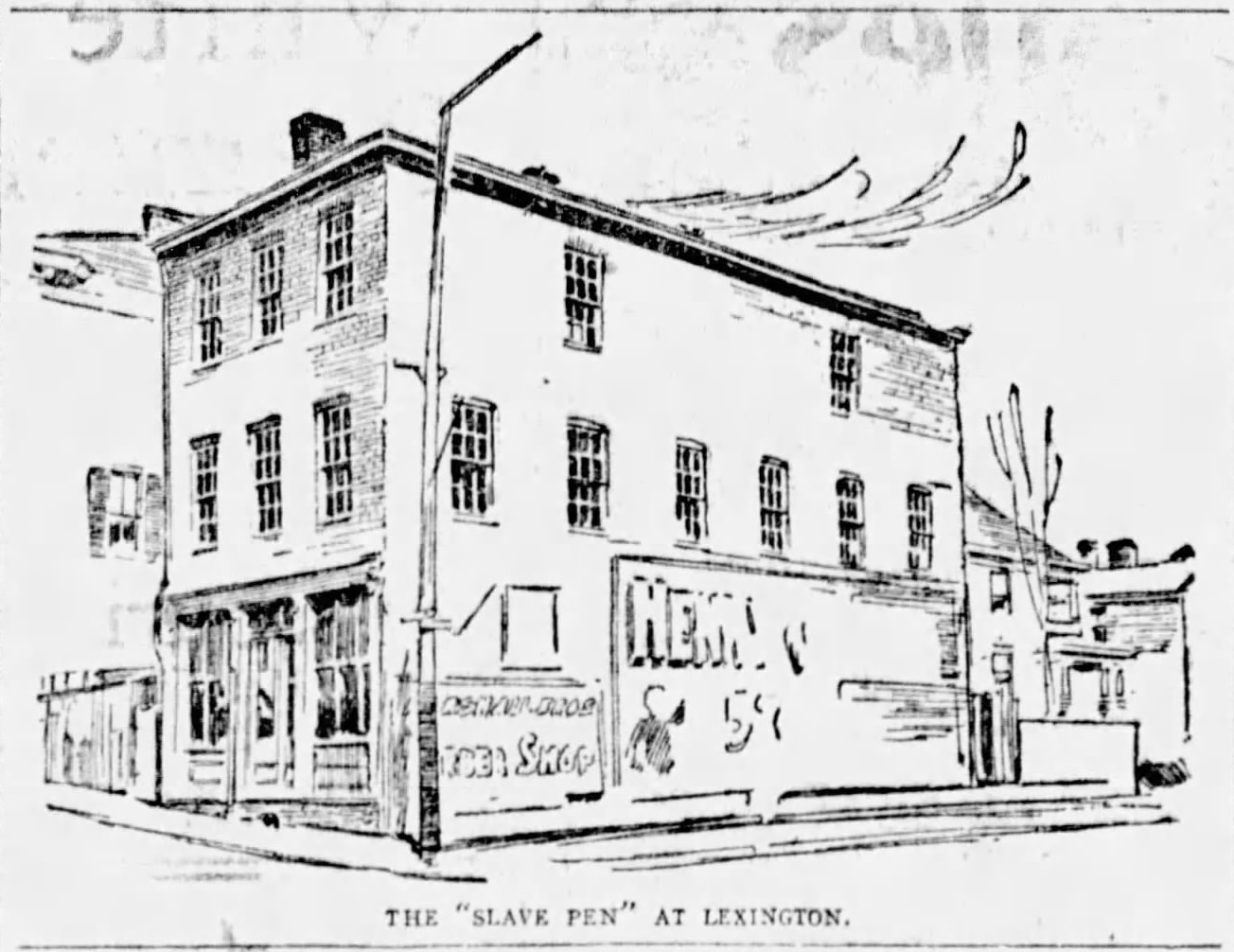
  Slave pen of "negro-trader White" in Lexington, Missouri, illustration 1908. According to Frederic Bancroft in Slave-Trading in the Old South "Lexington had two [resident slave traders] — one of whom 'was a wealthy planter of good repute', making a hotel his city headquarters and having a three-story building as a slave-pen. Platte City had a thriving trade, St. Joseph had at least one firm of slave-dealers, and Columbia and Marshall were not neglected by the traders. And the advertisements and the movements of the traders conclusively show a very active traffic in slaves because of the prices they would bring in the lower South."
- From a 1908 Kansas City Star article about Missouri in the American Civil War, "Lafayette county was intensely Southern to its sentiment. There still stands on Main street of the town of Lexington the building known as the 'slave pen' where 'Nigger Trader White'...kept unruly slaves whom he bought from their owners. When this dealer in 'black ivory' had a boat load sold to the planters down the river the 'pen' was emptied. To be sent 'down the River' was to a Missouri slave the greatest tragedy that could befall him." According to Harrison Anthony Trexler in 1914, there were two slave traders named on an 1861 map of Lexington, one of whom had a three-story pen and was called J. R. White.
- The autobiography of H. C. Bruce, published in 1895, recalled the collapsing slave trade in Missouri during the war:

From 1862 to the close of the war, slave property in the state of Missouri was almost a dead weight to the owner; he could not sell because there were no buyers. The business of the Negro trader was at an end, due to the want of a market. He could not get through the Union lines South with his property, that being his market. There was a man named White, usually called "Negro-trader White," who travelled over the state, buying Negroes like mules for the southern market, and when he had secured a hundred or more, he would take them, handcuffed together, to the South. He or his agents attended all sales where Negroes were to be sold without conditions. The sentiment against selling Negroes to traders was quite strong and there were many who would not sell at all, unless forced by circumstances over which they had no control, and would cry with the Negroes at parting. A Negro sold to a trader would bring from one to three hundred dollars more money.

I recall a case where a master was on a note as surety, and had the same, which was a large sum, to pay at maturity, and to do so he was forced to sell a young girl to raise the cash. He sent for Negro-trader White, and the sale was made in the city without his wife's knowledge, but when he attempted to deliver her, his wife and children clung to the girl and would not let her go. When White saw he could not get his Negro, he demanded a return of his money, which the seller had applied on the note and could not get back. The matter was finally settled in some way; at any rate the girl was not sold, and was in that county until 1864.

The Negro trader usually bought all Negroes who had committed murder or other crimes, for which public whipping was not considered sufficient punishment. Slaves usually got scared when it became known that Negro-trader White was in the community. The owners used White's name as a threat to scare the Negroes when they had violated some rule. "I'll sell you to the Negro trader, if you don't do better" was often as good or better punishment than the lash, for the slave dreaded being sold South, worse than the Russians do banishment to Siberia.

== Records ==
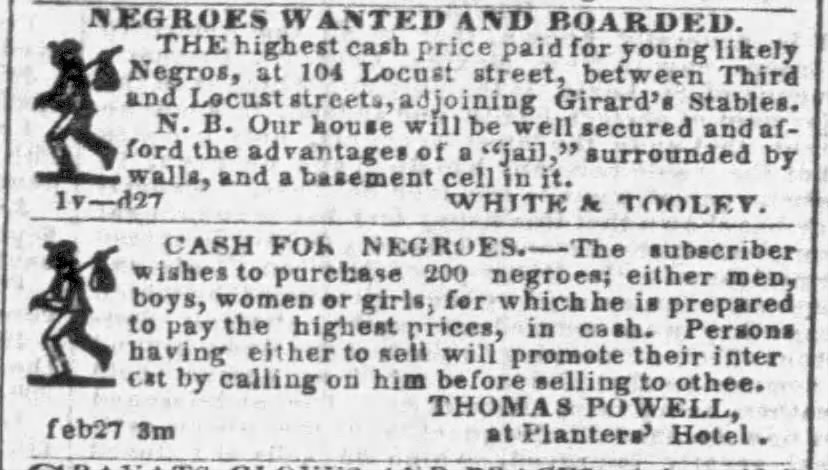
"Negroes Wanted and Boarded" St. Louis Post-Dispatch, May 6, 1847

In 1937 the Missouri Historical Review, the journal of the Missouri Historical Society, reported, "Through the courtesy of Mr. R. B. Chinn of Rocheport, Missouri, the Society has been permitted to make photostatic copies of two rare volumes containing the records of John R. White, a slave dealer of central Missouri. The first of these volumes contains records from December 24, 1844, to June 12, 1846; the second seems to date from 1846 to 1860. Note is made of the name of the slave bought, often the vendor, the price paid, to whom sold, and the price received, as well as occasional other data on price of transportation, medical care, board and room, loss by death, and so forth. Twenty-one additional papers, consisting of 44 pages, bring this unusual acquisition to a total of 254 pages."

== See also ==
- List of American slave traders
- History of slavery in Missouri
- Boone's Lick State Historic Site
