= Hatchers, Virginia =

Unincorporated community in Virginia, US

Coordinates: 37°34′50″N 78°03′05″W

Hatchers is an unincorporated community in Powhatan County, in the U.S. state of Virginia.
