= Hatcher, Georgia =

Unincorporated community in Georgia, US

Coordinates: 31°48′54″N 85°00′49″W

Hatcher is an unincorporated community in Quitman County, in the U.S. state of Georgia.

== History ==
The community was named after one John H. Hatcher. Variant names were "Hatchers", "Hatcher Station", and "Hatchers Station". A post office called Hatcher's Station was established in 1866, the name was changed to Hatcher in 1929, and the post office closed in 1963.
