= Exchange Place (New Orleans) =

Pedestrianized street in New Orleans, Louisiana

- Exchange Alley; Exchange Passage
- A view of Exchange Place with the New Orleans Central Business District in the background
- Interactive map of Exchange Place
- Former name: Passage de la Bourse (French)
- Type: alley
- Length: 140.3 m (460 ft)
- Area: New Orleans, Louisiana
- Addresses: Exchange Pl New Orleans, LA 70130
- Postal code: 70130
- Nearest metro station: French Quarter
- Coordinates: 29°57′14.8″N 90°04′03.1″W

Construction
- Completion: 1831

Other
- Designer: James Gallier Sr.
- Known for: Historical pedestrian zone

Exchange Place, also known as Exchange Alley and Exchange Passage, is a pedestrian zone that was created in 1831 originally as a small street in the French Quarter of New Orleans, Louisiana. Its original name was Passage de la Bourse, or Exchange Passage. The street was commissioned by the banker and merchant Samuel Jarvis Peters, who thought to build an exchange closer to Canal Street. It was built in coherence with the Merchants' Exchange Building on Royal Street as it acted as a back entrance. The street has been a hidden alleyway to many shops and restaurants over the years.

== Geography ==
Exchange Place Intersects with Canal Street, Iberville Street and Bienville Street, which has contributed to its importance.

Exchange Place originally extended from Canal Street to Toulouse Street, but the portion of it between Conti Street and Toulouse Street no longer exists. Exchange Alley paralleled Chartres Street and Royal Street. Exchange Alley is located on the upriver (or southwestern) side of the French Quarter

== Pronunciation/meaning ==
Exchange place is pronounced /iks-ˈchānj plās/. Its former French name, passage de la bourse is pronounced /pa-sij-de-lä-bu̇rs/. This name has French origins in which it can be translated to "Stock Exchange Passage" The name comes from its purpose and used to be a back alley for markets and exchanges.

== History ==
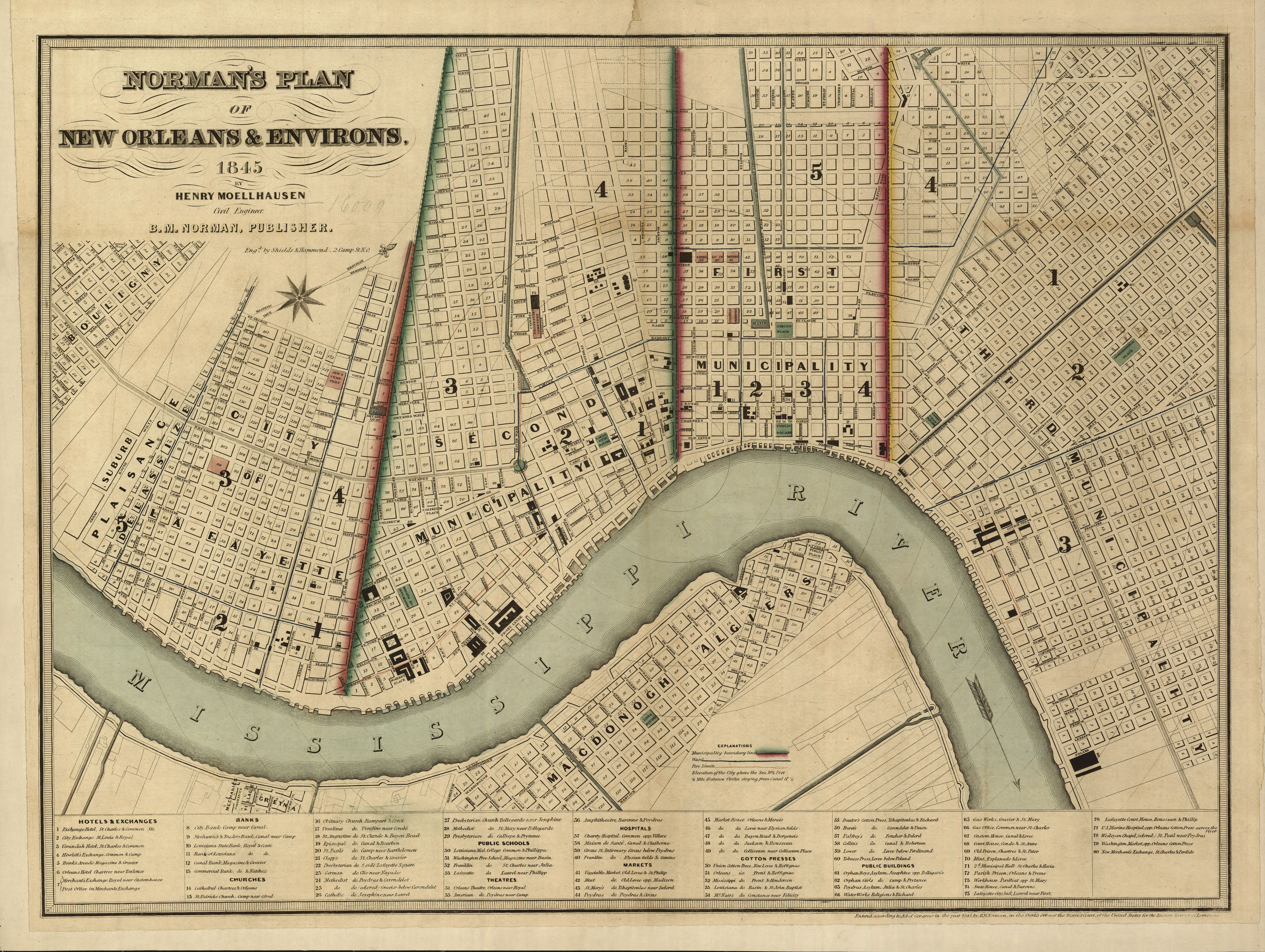
Norman's plan of New Orleans & environs, 1845; Exchange Place is marked as number 7

At the time, Canal Street was the dividing line between the French Quarter's Creoles and the Anglo-Americans on the CBD (Central Business District)/ Uptown Side. Peters wanted the exchange to shift more economic activity to the Anglo-American Portion of the city. The street was designed by architect James Gallier Sr., the Irishman who also worked on other projects such as Gallier Hall, the Pontalba buildings, and St. Charles Hotel. In past years the street has been home to many cafés, saloons, and clubhouses. The road was populated with architects who talked of art and engineering. On the last block of the alley once stood "Café des Colonnes," built by J.N.B de Pouilly's talented architect. The path was home to some of the most famous fencing instructors, such as Don Jose "Pepe Lulla, Armant Robert Severin, and Basile Croquere. Young wealthy Creole men would gather to exchange Passage to study under the masters who worked along and near the street.

=== After the Civil War ===
Commerce along the Exchange had diminished due to the restrictions placed during the Civil War and the fall of the slave-based economy previously established in the South. The Exchange Alley's neutral ground began to shift as power in New Orleans transferred from Creole to American.

=== Merchants' Exchange Building and the early 1900s ===
In 1835 James Gallier Jr. and Charles Dakin were commissioned to design the Merchant's Exchange Building. The building spanned between two separate three-story wings, one facing Royal and the other Exchange alley. It opened in 1836 and was home to the U.S Post Office, the City Court, Federal District Court, and a Billiard Club. During this time, the Exchange Alley was occupied with the elite antebellum, political officials, philosophers, and even presidents. Andrew Jackson had appeared in Merchants' Exchange building and to appear in federal court. The building was ultimately demolished in a fire in 1903. In 1910, the Louisiana Supreme Court Building was built on top of Exchange Alley's block, extending to Conti Street. After 1903 some solicitors could be found working with tradesman (repairers, silversmiths, cheap hotels, lodging houses). Bookstores and new stands like Goldthwaite's bookstore made the Exchange Place popular with book hunters and news enthusiasts. However, as time went on, the cafés and saloons along the exchange place became rooted with longshoremen, itinerant workers, and hobos. Some notable occupants along the Exchange Place include Longshoremen's Hall and the Sheet Metal Workers Union. Exchange Place went from being a hub of bars and drunk locals to tourists to shop in the occurring years.

== Today ==
The street is typically occupied with tourists as the businesses that occupy the alley cater to tourist and temporary guests. The road has become known as a pedestrian mall. Current enterprises include hotels like Wyndham New Orleans- French Quarter and Hotel Monteleone and restaurants like Amorino, Criollo, The Carousel, Justine, Smoothie King, Popeyes, Green Goddess, and Country Flame. The street is also home to convenient and souvenir stores like Walgreens, Logo Gift Shop, and Infrared Sauna Wholesaler. The road is also home to real-estate and commercial property.

== School district ==
The Exchange Place street falls under the Recovery School District.

== See also ==
- List of streets of New Orleans
- Banks' Arcade
