= Anna Granville Hatcher =

American linguist

- Born: 1905; Baltimore, Maryland, US
- Died: 1978 (aged 72–73)

Academic background
- Education: Blue Mountain College (BA); University of Virginia (MA); Johns Hopkins University (PhD)

Academic work
- Discipline: Linguistics
- Sub-discipline: Syntax, word formation, literary criticism
- Institutions: Johns Hopkins University; Indiana University

Anna Granville Hatcher (1905–1978) was an American linguist. She started her career as a Romance linguist, and later conducted research in medieval literature as well as branching out from Late Latin and Old French to studies on Provençal, Spanish, Italian, English, and German. She was the first woman to hold the position of full professor at Johns Hopkins University.

== Early life and career ==
Born in Baltimore, Maryland, her parents were Anna Denson Hatcher and Eldridge Burwell Hatcher. Hatcher earned a BA from Blue Mountain College in 1925 and an MA from the University of Virginia in 1927. In 1934, she earned a PhD in Romance languages at Johns Hopkins University. She served as an academic dean for four years at Harcum College, before joining the faculty at Johns Hopkins in 1939.

Hatcher's three books focus on issues of linguistics, while her journal articles cover two strands, one in linguistics, and one in medieval literary history, stylistics and criticism. Tributes and retrospectives of her work include Jan Firbas’s 1962 review “Notes on the function of the sentence in the act of communication: marginalia on two important studies in syntax by Anna Granville Hatcher” and Karen Hermann's “A Retrospective Critique of Anna Granville Hatcher's" Reflexive Verbs": Latin, Old French, Modern French (1942).”

== Awards and distinctions ==
Hatcher was awarded a Guggenheim Fellowship in 1953. In 1956, she became the first woman to hold the position of full professor at Johns Hopkins University. Hatcher was also the first woman to receive the title of Distinguished Professor (French and Italian and Spanish and Portuguese) from Indiana University.

== Selected works ==
- Hatcher. A.G. An introduction to the analysis of English noun compounds. Word, 1960
- Hatcher, A.G. Theme and Underlying Question. Two studies of Spanish word-order, Word. New York 1956
- Hatcher, A.G. Modern English Word-Formation and Neo-Latin. A Study of the Origins of English (French, Italian, German) copulative compounds, Baltimore 1951
- Hatcher, A.G. The use of the progressive form in English: A new approach. Language, 1951
- Hatcher, A.G. Reflexive verbs: Latin, Old French, Modern French, Johns Hopkins Press. Baltimore, Johns Hopkins Press, 1942
