= Chris Hatcher =

Chris Hatcher may refer to:

- Chris Hatcher (American football) (born 1973), American football coach
- Chris Hatcher (outfielder) (born 1969), American baseball player
- Chris Hatcher (pitcher) (born 1985), American baseball player
- Chris Hatcher (psychologist) (1946–1999), clinical psychologist at the University of California, San Francisco
