= Sue Hatcher =

Australian animal genetics researcher

Sue Hatcher is an Australian animal geneticist and livestock consultant. She is the Director of Makin Outcomes Pty Ltd, an independent research, development and adoption consultancy based in Orange, New South Wales, and serves as Chair of the Southern Australia Livestock Research Council. She is also an Adjunct Senior Research Fellow at Charles Sturt University and Editor-in-Chief of the journal Animal - Science Proceedings.

== Career ==
Hatcher received her Bachelor's degree in 1989 and PhD from the University of Western Australia in 1995 in Animal Science. She then took a position with the Woolmark Company as their Wool Grower Communications Officer, before leaving in 1997 to work with New South Wales Agriculture.

She conducts applied research into the genetic, economic and industry constraints on wool production around Australia, including work on wool metrology and fibre identification. Speaking to the Australian Broadcasting Corporation, she said:

The key is to use genetics, to make genetic change over time, because every time you make a change it becomes additive.

Hatcher was part of a team of researchers who received a Star Award in 2014 from the Cooperative Research Centre for Sheep Industry Innovation for engagement with small and medium size businesses. Throughout her career Hatcher has been an advocate for effective research communication, saying "There is no point in conducting science if the outcomes of the research aren’t able to be effectively communicated to the targeted end user of the work."

She is an Associate Editor for Animal Production Science.
