= John T. Hatcher =

American slave trader (~1824–1866)

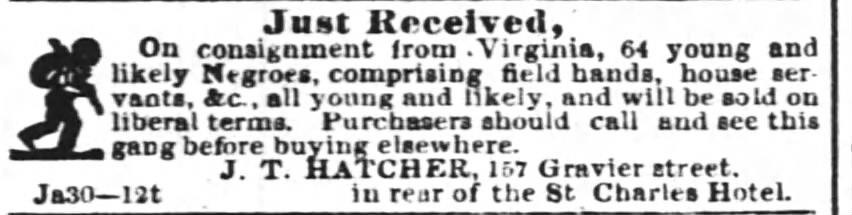
- "Just received" (New Orleans Times-Picayune, Feb. 11, 1853)
- Born: c. 1824; Norfolk, Virginia, U.S.
- Died: June 7, 1866; Summit, Pike County, Mississippi, U.S.
- Occupation: Slave trader

John T. Hatcher (c. 1824 – June 7, 1866) was a 19th-century American slave trader. He was the younger brother of slave trader C. F. Hatcher; they worked together in Natchez, Mississippi and New Orleans, Louisiana. Two days before Christmas 1858, he whipped an enslaved woman to death and fled New Orleans to avoid the consequences.

== Biography ==
Hatcher was a native of Norfolk, Virginia.

Hatcher's testimony in an 1843 court case is a valuable primary source on how slave traders dressed the enslaved for sale and on the nature of the domestic work performed by enslaved women in a slave pen. According to historian Alexandra J. Finley, "Male slave traders outsourced the traditionally feminine task of laundry to either enslaved women or free women in the neighborhood whom they paid. In addition to their domestic labor, the slave traders relied on the expertise of these women to identify and report 'unnatural discharges' when they returned with the laundered clothes."

Hatcher was selling at the Forks of the Road slave market outside Natchez, Mississippi in 1846, offering "newly imported Maryland Negroes". An ad of 1847 advertised that Hatcher's stand had ties to a "trading house" in New Orleans allowing on-demand delivery of special orders of particular types of human beings. C. F. and J. T. Hatcher were residents of New Orleans, Louisiana at the time of the 1850 U.S. census. They lived in the same household (likely a boarding house) and both listed their occupation as "trader".

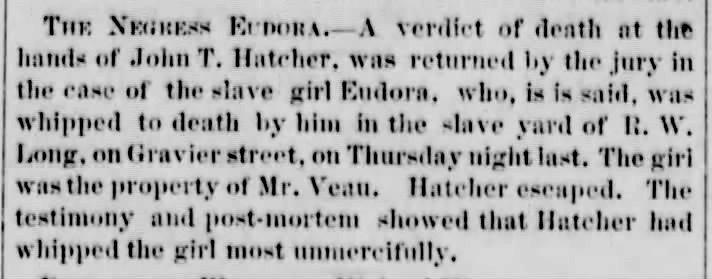
"The Negress Eudora" (New Orleans Daily Delta, Dec. 28, 1858)

As reported in the Anti-Slavery Bugle of Ohio in 1859, "John T. Hatcher, keeper of a slave yard in New Orleans, whipped a negro woman named Eudora for an hour and a quarter, on [December 23, 1858], from the effects of which she died in a short time. Hatcher fled, and at last account had not been arrested." French abolitionist Pierre-Suzanne-Augustin Cochin covered the murder in his book L'Abolition de l'esclavage, republishing an account in the New Orleans Bee that "caused some sensation in that city". The whipping took place at R. W. Long's slave pen on Gravier Street, and "Mr. Harvey deposed that the cracking of the whip was heard during about an hour and a half, with one interruption of five or six minutes." Hatcher was apprehended in St. Louis, Missouri, in March 1859. After trying and failing to bribe the arresting officers to let him go, Hatcher was later released from custody by the Governor of Missouri at the behest of the Governor of Louisiana, which the St. Louis Globe-Democrat said "strikingly indicates the power of money to protect an accused man".

Hatcher died in Summit, Mississippi in June 1866.

== See also ==
- List of American slave traders
- History of slavery in Louisiana
- Slave markets and slave jails in the United States
- Bibliography of the slave trade in the United States
