= C. F. Hatcher =

American slave trader (c. 1814 – 1869)

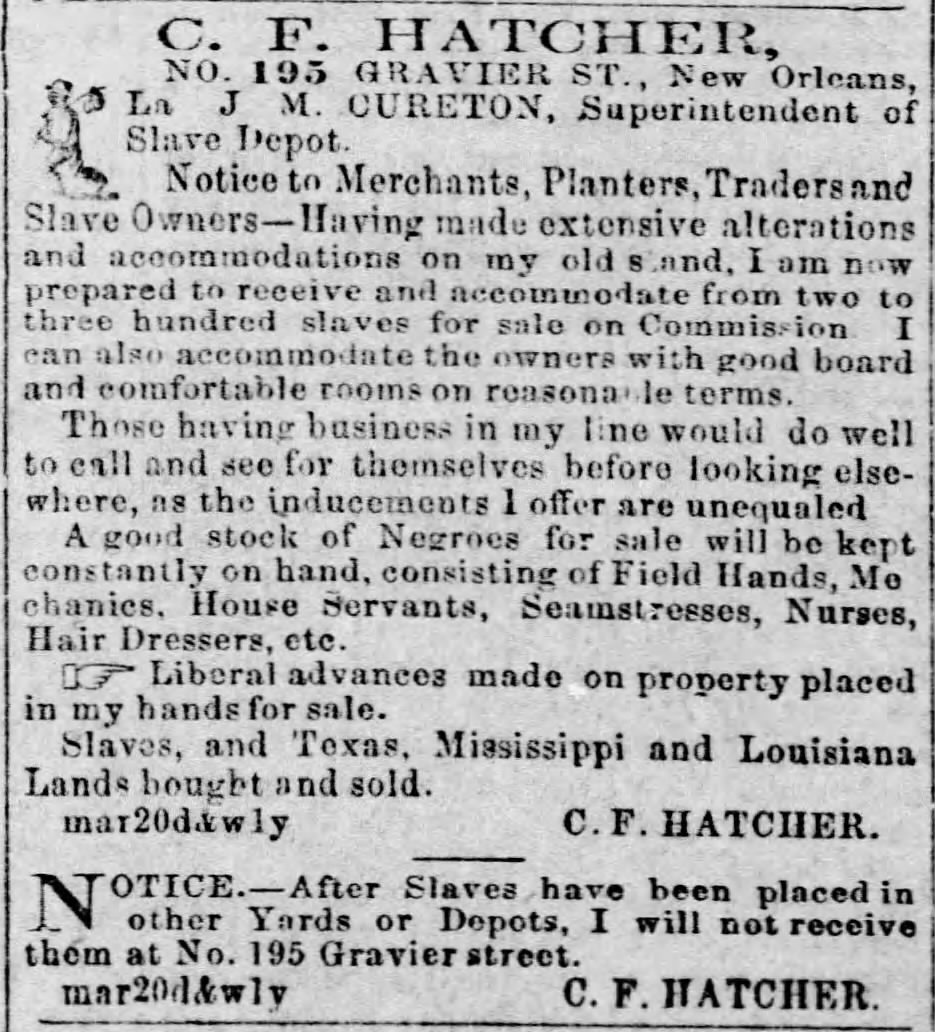
- Mississippi Free Trader, Natchez, February 18, 1861
- Born: c. 1814; Virginia, U.S.
- Died: 1869; Mississippi, U.S.
- Occupation: Slave trader

Charles F. Hatcher, typically advertising as C. F. Hatcher, was a 19th-century American slaver dealing out of Natchez, Mississippi, and New Orleans, Louisiana. He also worked as a trader of financial instruments, specie, and stocks, and as a land agent, with a special interest in selling Mississippi, Louisiana, and Texas real estate to speculators and settlers.

C. F. Hatcher started working as a slave trader when he was 16 years old, and became wealthy harvesting people from Virginia, North Carolina, and Tennessee, and transporting them south for resale to cotton and sugar planters. His father Charles Hatcher before him may have been a slave trader, and he eventually worked alongside his younger half-brother John T. Hatcher in Cotton Kingdom slave markets of Louisiana and Mississippi. In company with Walter L. Campbell, C. M. Rutherford, Joseph A. Beard, Joseph Bruin, and Thomas Foster, Hatcher has been described as one of the "more notorious" slave traders working in New Orleans in the decade immediately preceding the American Civil War. Hatcher is also the only known "negro trader" who became a recruiter running an employment office after the end of slavery in the United States.

== Biography ==
=== Family and early career ===
Census records indicate that Hatcher was born in Virginia, likely between 1812 and 1815. Per an 1861 newspaper report, C. F. Hatcher was originally from Norfolk, Virginia. He is believed to be the son of Charles Hatcher of Caswell County, North Carolina and Norfolk, Virginia, and an unidentified mother. In an 1887 biography of Hatcher's son, it was recounted that Hatcher began working as a slave trader when he was 16 years old, which would have been approximately 1830. In October 4, 1834, a marriage bond for Charles F. Hatcher and Nancy Pettet was filed with Surry County, North Carolina, with F. P. Pettet as surety. According to one genealogy book, "The Hatcher family came to East Tennessee from Virginia. Charles F. Hatcher married Nannie Pettit, and they lived and died in Polk County. Their son G. R. Hatcher was born in 1834." This rendition of the family history may be somewhat inaccurate as Nancy Pettit Hatcher apparently filed for divorce from C. F. Hatcher in Surry County, North Carolina, in 1840, with a county superior court finding that Hatcher was not a resident of the state. Years later, a friend testified that C. F. Hatcher "was well-known to be a bachelor".

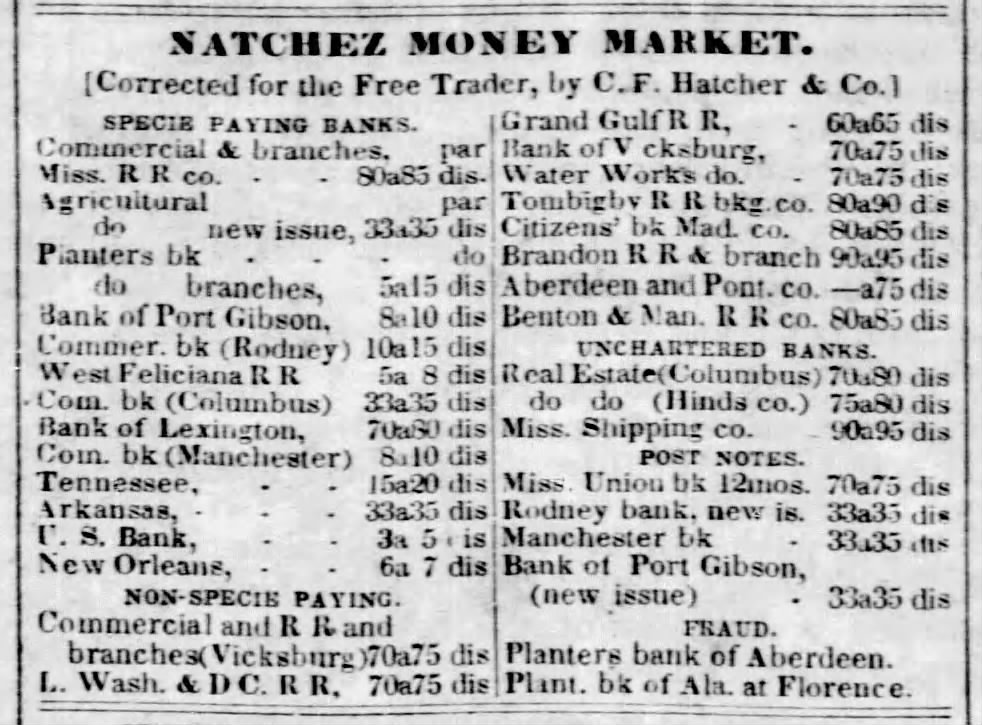
"Natchez Money Market" Mississippi Free Trader, June 4, 1840

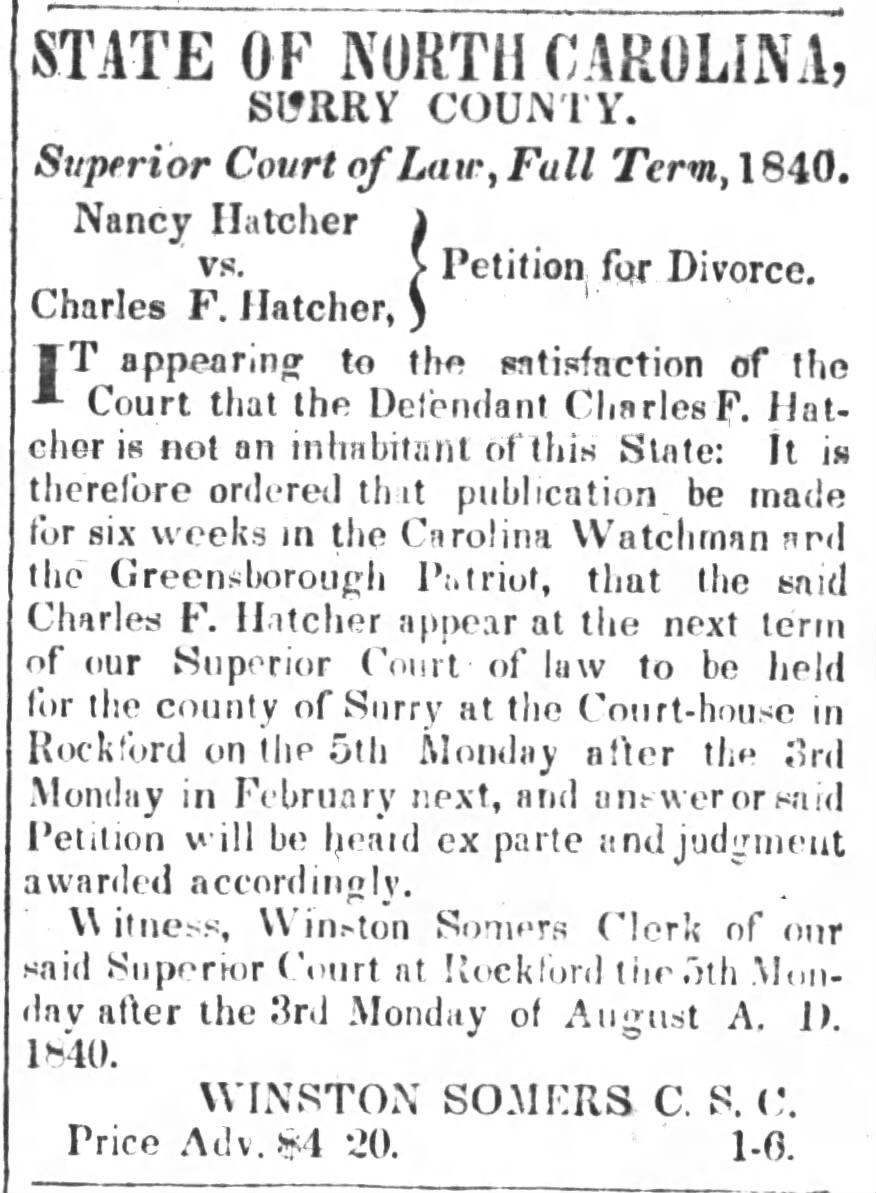
"State of North Carolina, Surry County" The Greensboro Patriot, February 23, 1841

North Carolina non-resident C. F. Hatcher could be found in Natchez, Mississippi in 1838, where he placed a newspaper ad informing the community that he had reopened the exchange office once run by G. Morgan in the Main Street auction house of Mr. F. H. Dolbear: "All kinds of money bought and sold. Bills of Exchange, Checks, Drafts, Certificates of Deposit, all kinds of Exchange, made on the best of terms." In another ad he listed "gold, silver, U. States, and New Orleans funds" for sale. The following year Hatcher's business partner D. A. Tatum died and Hatcher announced that he would continue their "exchange and lottery" business as a sole proprietor, working out of an office opposite the City Hotel of Natchez. At Christmas 1839, a landowner named William Wynn placed a newspaper ad in the Mississippi Free Trader listing C. F. Hatcher in Natchez, Mississippi as the broker of record for the planned sale or lease of two enslaved men with horse-training expertise "both of whom were brought up in my possession and having been accustomed to horses, I prefer indulging them to placing them on cotton farm on Red River, where they are at this time destined. Presuming, as I do, that no gentleman would purchase without knowing their qualifications, I prefer hireing for one year." In 1840, a lawsuit was filed against one Charles Hatcher (this is possibly C. F. Hatcher, but may be his father, Charles) and a business partner in Richmond County, Georgia: "David Wolfe states that he purchased a slave, Sely, 23 years of age, for $625 from Joseph Woods and Charles Hatcher, slave traders. Wolfe states that the slave was afflicted with a venereal disease or the 'bad disorder', and died five months after the sale. Wolfe asserts that during her illness, he incurred medical expenses amounting to $1,000 for the care of the slave. He charges the defendants with fraud and seeks $1,000 in damages." C. F. Hatcher & Co. donated $100 to a fund for victims of the 1840 Natchez tornado. In 1841 Hatcher sold treasury warrants, and dissolved his partnership with W. H. Wilkinson. Also in 1841, Charles Hatcher was one of the slave traders who put cargo on the coastwise slave ship Creole. A group of men being shipped south overcame the crew and had the ship sailed to the Bahamas, where the British gave them asylum. Again, it is not clear whether this is the father or the son, but in 1841 "counsel representing Charles Hatcher and Jason Andrews sued the Ocean Insurance Company for eight human cargoes valued at $3,300. Judge Watts summoned the insurer to the Commercial Court of New Orleans to answer the claim. On June 15, 1842, both plaintiffs appear to have transferred their claims in a notarized document before public notary William Christy, although the recipient remains unclear." Hatcher's father, Charles Hatcher, was a resident of Circus Street in New Orleans and died in that city in October 1842 of yellow fever.

In approximately 1846, C. F. Hatcher was a deponent in the Supreme Court of Louisiana case Mark Davis v. Obediah D. Hammett. In October 1847, an unidentified "negro child" who was the legal property of "Hatcher & Willison (traders)" died in Natchez and was buried under the authority of the Adams County sexton.

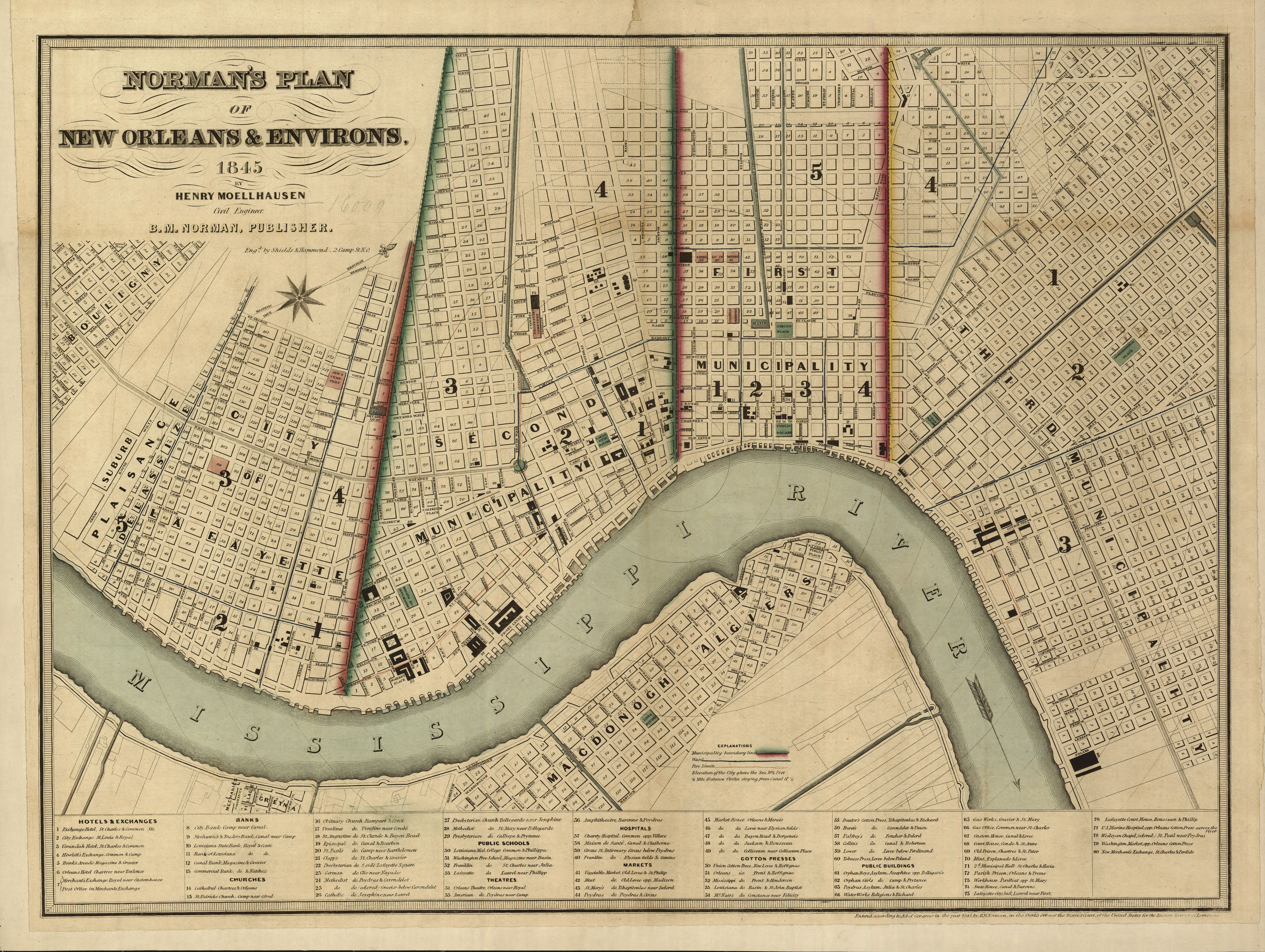
Norman's plan of New Orleans & environs, 1845

=== 1850s ===
C. F. Hatcher and his younger half-brother John T. Hatcher were residents of New Orleans, Louisiana at the time of the 1850 U.S. census. They lived in the same household (likely a boarding house) and both listed their occupation as "trader". Also in 1850 Hatchet dissolved his partnership with George Evans in Natchez, and announced that he was an agent for "scrip for lands forfeited to the General Government prior to the year 1820". In 1853 he visited Richmond, Virginia, and was advertising land in Texas to "speculators and settlers", a business interest that continued to 1856 and beyond.

At the beginning of 1856 Hatcher was superintendent of a "slave barracks" at 195 Gravier in New Orleans that belonged to an auction company called J. L. Carman & Co. This building was located in heart of what might have been called New Orleans' Slave District as it was "dominated by traders' pens and offices: in 1854, there were no fewer than seven slave dealers in a single block on Gravier, while on a single square on Moreau Street there was a row of eleven particularly commodious slave pens". As one historian explained, "As the domestic slave trade boomed, the world of private jailing opened new entry level employment opportunities in traders' pens. In New Orleans, in particular, this was an expansive world. One former bondsman even recalled passing by one street lined entirely by ‘one solid row of buildings where human beings were incarcerated waiting for a purchaser'. By incorporating the confinement of human chattels into their businesses, the owners of these private jails were at once able to save on public jail fees and generate an income by renting out cells. The more successful traders could afford to hire plain folk to manage this for them." Hatcher parlayed the "fixed wage and limited liability" of work as slave jailor in a "more prosperous career in the exchange of human flesh".

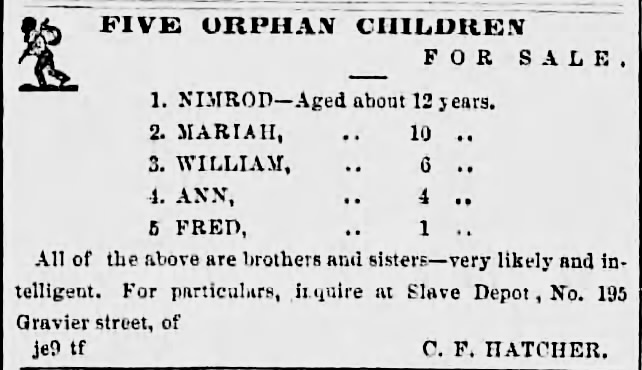
In June 1859, C. F. Hatcher advertised that siblings Nimrod, Mariah, William, Ann, and Fred could be bought at his slave depot at 195 Gravier Street.

In January 1857, C. F. Hatcher was offering for rent the buildings at 195 Gravier, which were "well adapted for keeping slaves". Qualified lessees could take possession of the building immediately, with or without furniture. In November 1858 Hatcher advertised 30 slaves "just received, consisting of Field Hands, House Servants, Seamstresses, Mechanics, Cooks, Washers, Ironers, etc etc." In 1859 he listed for sale a skilled bricklayer named Jacob, and later the same month an "A1 blacksmith and bricklayer" as well as an assortment of "Georgia field hands". By 1859 Hatcher seemingly prided himself on his expertise in the slave market. According to historian Walter Johnson, "There may have been a distinction attached to buying without looking too closely. As slave dealer C. F. Hatcher put it about a slave he had sold without stripping: 'I looked at the boy, talked to him, he seemed perfectly sound & healthy. If the boy had been diseased at the time I should have perseved it.' With a gaze as acute as his own, Hatcher thought he did not need to look any closer". On the eve of the American Civil War, Hatcher was likely earning a 2.5 percent commission on every slave sale, operated his own jail and yard, and "sought slaves of all kinds".

=== 1860s ===
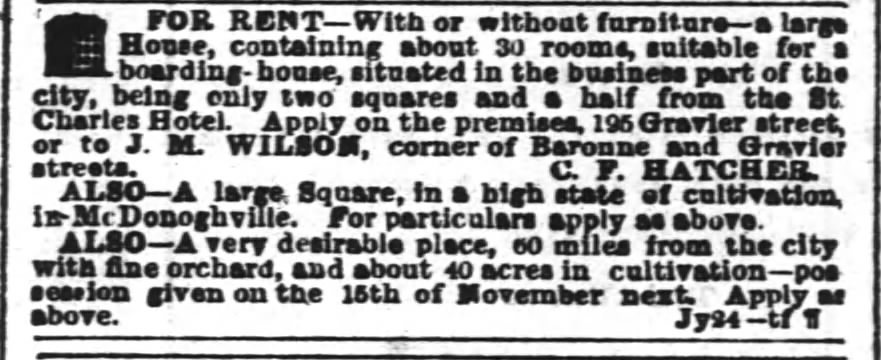
After the end of the American Civil War, Hatcher had a building at 195 Gravier with 30 rooms "for rent"; prospective tenants should inquire with another former slave trader of New Orleans, J. M. Wilson. (The Times-Picayune, October 4, 1865)

At the time of the 1860 census of New Orleans, Hatcher's occupation was listed as "slave depot," he had two live-in employees, he owned real estate worth $30,000, and his personal property was worth $6,000. Hatcher was dually enumerated in 1860, and was also listed as a resident of Livingston Parish, Louisiana, with real estate valued at $3,000, and personal wealth of $5,000. By 1860, Hatcher was so much a part of the New Orleans scene that he was an American Party candidate for city alderman. He also kept his depot open all summer even though "he had closed for summer in the past in part to avoid pandemics". As historian Frederic Bancroft put it in Slave Trading in the Old South (1931):

By 1860 [Hatcher] was advertising throughout the South to inform 'merchants, planters, traders and owners of slaves' that he had made extensive alterations in his stand and was prepared to receive from 200 to 300 slaves to sell on commission; that he could furnish slaveowners with good meals and comfortable rooms at reasonable rates, and that he should constantly keep a good stock of all kinds of slaves for sale, including nurses, hairdressers, etc. As was common, he offered liberal advances on all property placed in his hands; but he must be first choice or none: he would not receive slaves that had been in other yards or depots. His pride was his new and very commodious show-room...To his establishment all might come with their slaves, get board and lodging and find buyers—exactly as drovers and ranchmen bring their carloads of steers or sheep to the stockyards and live at the drover-hotels."

Visitors to Hatcher's slave pen "might consult the list which was constantly posted at the door 'showing the ages, qualifications, etc., of the negroes on hand.'" Or they could visit his farm "in the piny woods, three and one-half miles from Tickfaw Station and only three and one-half hours from New Orleans" where he constantly had on hand for sale between 25 and 50 negroes. Tickfaw is located in Tangipahoa Parish 58 miles outside of New Orleans, between Ponchatoula and Amite, along the New Orleans, Jackson and Great Northern Railroad. However, the rebellion of the Confederate States destabilized Hatcher's business plan. He was still advertising in newspapers like Atlanta's Southern Confederacy in 1861, but was simultaneously petitioning the state legislature of Confederate Louisiana for financial relief. And in 1862 he advertised he was ready to trade land for negroes, and visa versa, but that plan was disrupted once and for all when U.S. forces recaptured New Orleans. Hatcher fled the city for Confederate redoubt of Mobile, Alabama. In 1863, the U.S. government confiscated property belonging to C. F. Hatcher that was valued at $10,500. It was later returned to him.

By 1865, C. F. Hatcher was back in New Orleans, and in partnership with one Col. Holmstedt, "opened an agency for planters, laborers and emigrants". Hatcher continued this business into 1866, against a background of court proceedings and rulings in lawsuits filed against him, which had either been triggered by the circumstances of the war or predated it but had been delayed until the military and political situation settled. According to historian William Cohen, "Of 83 slave traders who were described as such in the cities of Memphis, Richmond, New Orleans, and Montgomery in the years just before the war, only one [C. F. Hatcher] is known to have worked after the war as a labor agent." He was listed in the 1866 city directory as proprietor of a "General Intelligence Office for Labor" and in the 1867 directory as a Planters Emigrant Agent. After that, writes Cohen, "he disappeared from the directory". C. F. Hatcher died in Mississippi in 1869. As his son summarized his career some 20 years after his death, C. F. Hatcher had spent his life "carrying [people] from Virginia, North Carolina and Tennessee, to New Orleans. He continued this business until the emancipation. He amassed an extensive fortune which he afterward lost".

== See also ==
- List of American slave traders
- History of slavery in Louisiana
- Slave markets and slave jails in the United States
- Bibliography of the slave trade in the United States
