= Verandah Hotel =

Antebellum New Orleans (1839–1855)

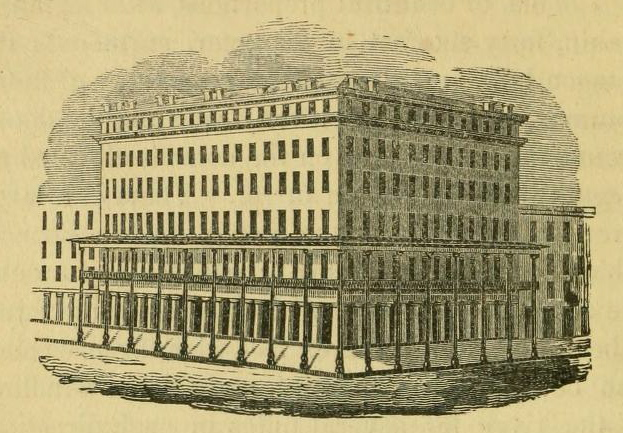
Verandah pictured in Norman's New Orleans and Environs (1845)

The Verandah Hotel was an architecturally significant antebellum hotel in New Orleans, Louisiana, United States. The Verandah operated from 1839 to 1855, when it was gutted by a building fire. It was located kitty corner from the St. Charles Hotel. The design of the Verandah apparently started a fad for cast-iron balconies in the Deep South.
