= Lynch's slave pen =

Historic slave-trading operation in Saint Louis, Missouri, United States

Lynch's slave pen was a 19th-century slave pen, or slave jail, in the city of St. Louis, Missouri, United States, that held enslaved men, women, and children while they waited to be sold. Bernard M. Lynch, a St. Louis slave trader, owned the slave pen. Lynch operated the slave pen at this location from 1859 until the U.S. Army confiscated it in 1861.

The facility was located at the corner of Fifth and Myrtle streets in St. Louis, which placed it in the same area as many of the city's commercial enterprises and governmental buildings. Currently, Busch Stadium and St. Louis Ballpark Village occupy the site where Lynch's slave pen once stood.

== Background ==
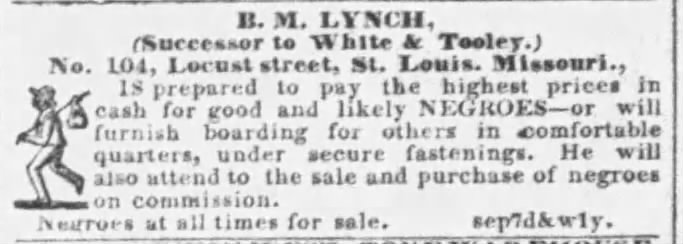
Lynch's Locust Street jail had previously been run by the slave trader John R. White and his partner Toomey; an 1848 ad promised "secure fastenings" for holding slaves ("B. M. Lynch - Successor to White & Tooley" St. Louis Post-Dispatch, September 11, 1848)

Bernard M. Lynch was born in Maryland in 1814. After moving to St. Louis, Lynch amassed wealth from his involvement in multiple enterprises related to the domestic slave trade in the United States. These endeavors included but were not limited to operating the slave pen at Fifth and Myrtle streets as well as another nearby jail on Locust Street between Fourth and Fifth streets, where he also sold enslaved people. According to the 1860 census, Lynch's estate was valued at $38,700 (equivalent to $1,387,000 in 2025). The slave schedule from the 1860 census also recorded that Lynch owned three enslaved people: a thirty-five-year-old woman, a sixteen-year-old girl, and a nine-year-old boy. Each enslaved person was additionally described as "mulatto."

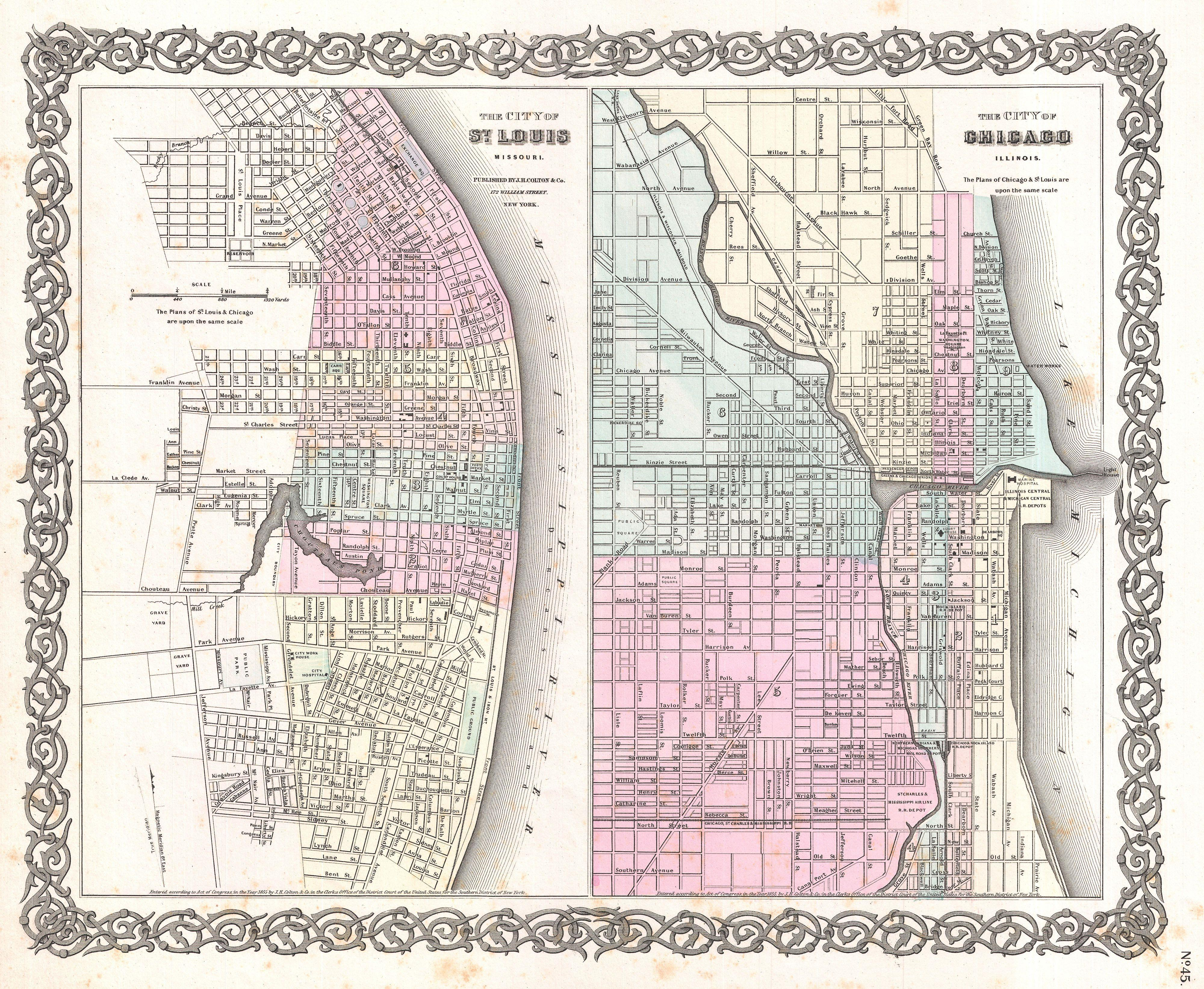
Map of St. Louis c. 1855

In addition to detaining enslaved people awaiting sale in the slave pen, Lynch also worked as a slave trader and slave catcher. In his interactions with Henry Shaw, the founder of the Missouri Botanical Garden, Lynch served in all three of his vocations: slave jailer, trader, and catcher. Lynch charged Shaw for the capture and arrest of a runaway enslaved woman owned by Shaw named Esther. Lynch also charged Shaw for boarding Esther and another enslaved person in his slave pen. Lynch later sold Esther on Shaw's behalf to an enslaver based in Mississippi.

While it is difficult to know how often Lynch captured, jailed, and traded the same enslaved person as he did with Esther, a list of rules for the slave pen that Lynch wrote in 1858 suggests that he performed each of these services and profited from providing them on other occasions. In the list, Lynch set the rates for the board and sale of enslaved people at 37 ½ cents per day and 2 ½ percent of the sale price, respectively. Lynch's business became so lucrative that by 1859 he ran out of space to conduct his operations just out of the building on Locust Street, and he bought an additional building at Fifth and Myrtle Streets to support his business.

Lynch fled Missouri early in the Civil War. He was a merchant in Louisiana, married, and joined the White League.

== Description ==
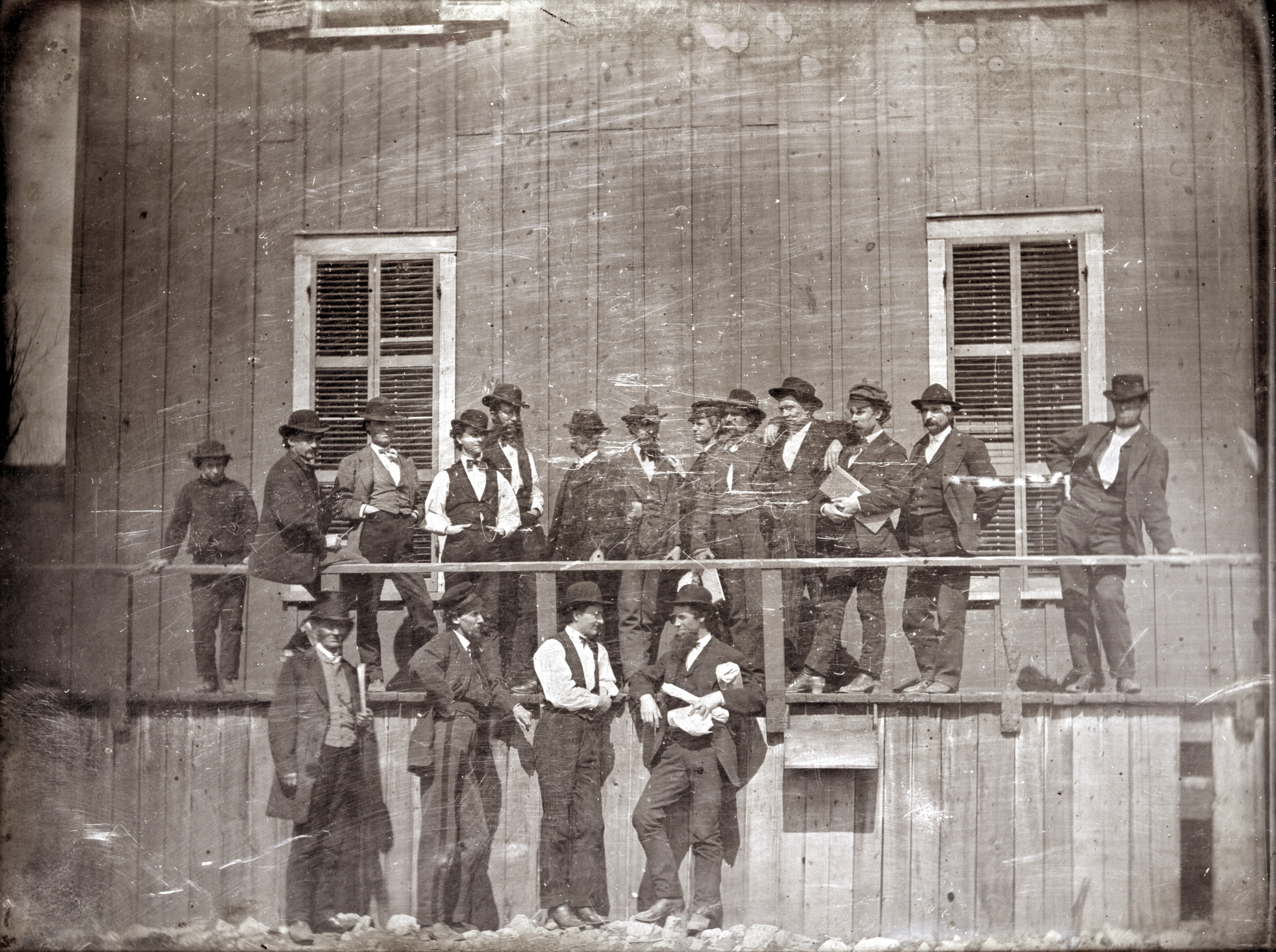
A group of men gather outside of Lynch's office and slave pen at Locust Street in 1852.

After Lynch purchased the building at Fifth and Myrtle streets, he installed bars on the windows in addition to other security measures like locks so that he could use it as another one of his slave pens. Lynch's slave pen consisted of at least four cells at basement-level. Each of the cells was made of brick walls. The only opening in the cells was a doorway-like space along the front wall for people to enter and exit. A more thorough physical description of the slave pen is challenging to produce because there are few sources available from when the facility was in operation that described the conditions of Lynch's slave pen. Furthermore, no archaeological survey of the slave pen was conducted before it was destroyed during the creation of Busch Stadium in 1963.

One extant document pertaining to the conditions inside of the slave pen from the time of its existence is a list of rules that Lynch wrote. The list of seven rules was dated January 1, 1858. Most of the rules enumerated in the document governed the expectations of the owners of the enslaved people detained in Lynch's slave pen. These rules described the costs and risks enslavers incurred by placing people they enslaved in the slave pen and, therefore, under Lynch's care. Lynch did include two policies for treating enslaved people in the slave pens. He assured enslavers that he would attempt to prevent "escapes or accidents" among enslaved people in the pen. He also claimed that he would offer "the same protection" to the enslaved people he detained as the people he enslaved.

Another account describing the conditions in the slave pens is found in The Story of a Border City During the Civil War, a book written by theologian Galusha Anderson. In his book, Anderson described a visit that he and some of his colleagues from the Young Men's Christian Association took in 1859 to Lynch's slave pens at Fifth and Myrtle streets and on Locust Street. Anderson estimated that most of the enslaved people in the slave pen at Fifth and Myrtle were between the ages of five and sixteen. Additionally, some of the mothers of the enslaved children were also held in the slave pen. The pen was guarded by an unnamed man who "defended the breaking up of families by the sale of slaves." Anderson also reported on a sale of a boy that he witnessed at the slave pen shortly after he visited with his colleagues from the Young Men's Christian Association. The boy, who Anderson believed was around ten years old, cried so extensively when he was taken away from the pen that the enslaver who purchased him returned to also purchase the boy's mother in an attempt to assuage the boy's sadness. Anderson reported that the mother was later returned to the slave pen once the enslaver successfully transported the boy to his home.

The building stopped being used as a slave pen in September 1861.

== Myrtle Street Prison ==
During the American Civil War, the U.S. Army, empowered by the Confiscation Act of 1861, took over the building that once held Lynch's slave pen. The building was renamed Myrtle Street Prison. As a prison operated by the Army, Confederate soldiers were incarcerated in it. Unlike other military prisons, civilians who supported the Confederacy and U.S. Army soldiers were also incarcerated in the Myrtle Street Prison.

The process of repurposing former slave pens and slave jails during the Civil War was not uncommon. Similar to the conversion of Lynch's slave pen to a prison used by the U.S. Army, other slave pens and markets across the southern United States were appropriated by the U.S. Army to serve as prisons for Confederate soldiers and contraband camps. Formerly enslaved people also used slave pens and markets as places of worship and schoolhouses. The spaces that had once been used to sell people of African descent to other people were later used by formerly enslaved people to celebrate and act upon their emancipation. Many formerly enslaved people and their allies noted this transformation and viewed it as one form of divine justice.

== Commemoration ==
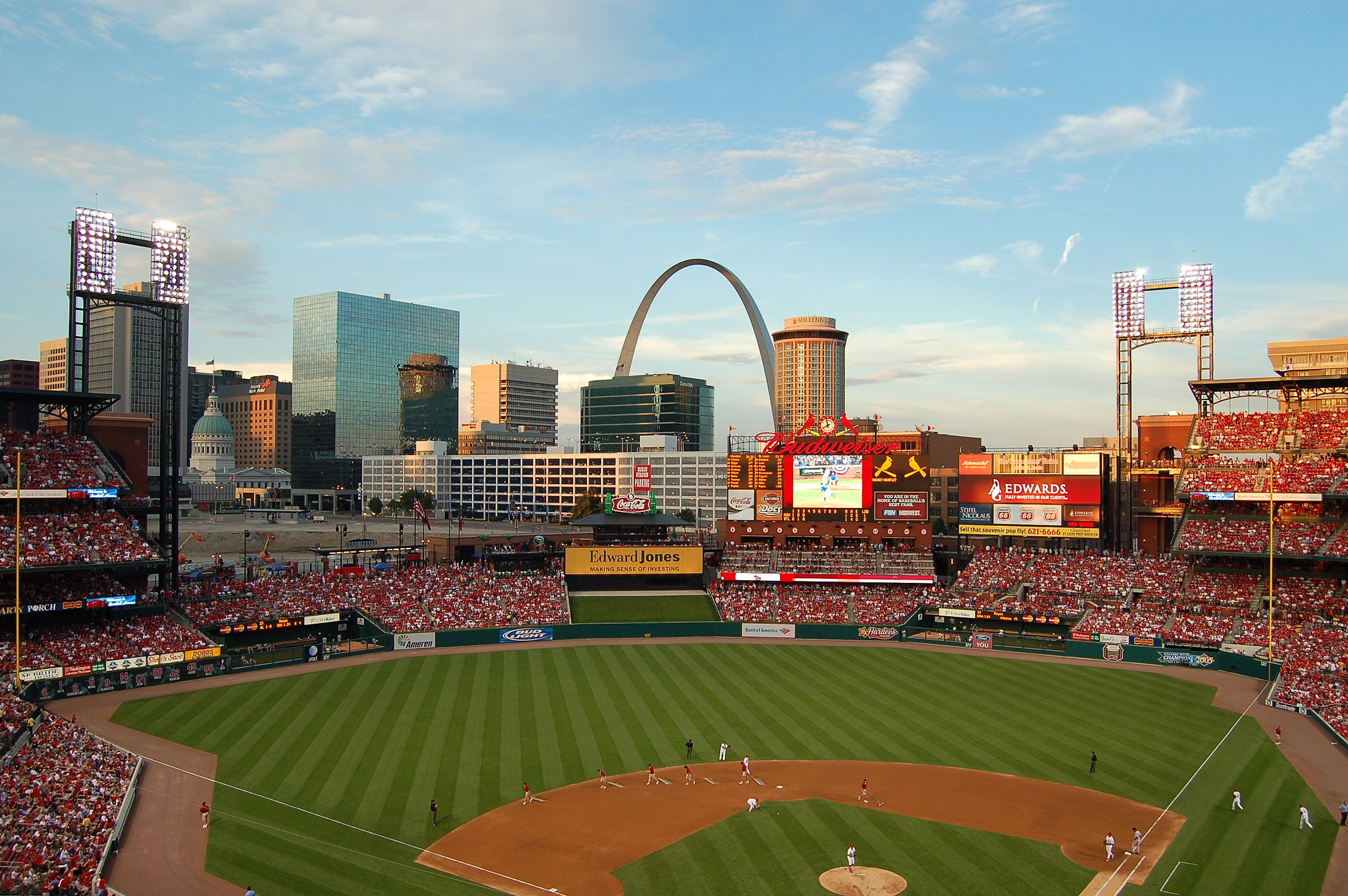
The location where Lynch's slave pen at Fifth and Myrtle Streets once stood is now occupied by Busch Stadium.

The Young Men's Division of the Chamber of Commerce installed the first recorded public commemoration of Lynch's slave pen and the Myrtle Street Prison. In the 1920s, the organization formed a Historic Sites Committee that researched and selected sites that would convey St. Louis' national historical significance and encourage tourism in the city. By 1944, the committee had contributed 126 markers to St. Louis' landscape. Four markers, including the marker commemorating the slave pen and military prison, "explicitly referenced African American history." The marker meant to signal the site where Lynch's slave pen once existed was shaped like a shield and featured black text on a white background. The descriptive text on the sign read: "Here was located the Lynch Slave Pens and Prison. This was one of the more important slave markets. The last slave was sold here in 1861. At the beginning of the civil war a federal prison was located here." By 1971, most of the markers that the Historic Sites Committee had installed no longer remained at the sites they marked. While some markers were replaced, the marker commemorating the slave pen was not.

When construction began on Busch Stadium, some historians and other scholars expressed concern about the lack of investigation and commemoration of the slave pen at the site. A spokesperson for the St. Louis Cardinals countered the claim that the organization was ignoring history, stating, "The Cardinals are building history right now." Some historians argue that the persistent lack of acknowledgment of the slave pen at the site is "leaving a wound in the commemoration and recognition of injustices that built the city and continue to shape it." In 2019 historian Anne C. Bailey argued that marking these sites "would help to heal their dark legacy."

In 2020, efforts to replace historical plaques were initiated by then state representatives Trish Gunby and Rasheen Aldridge Jr. Gunby became aware of the lost history when she saw a picture of Ballpark Village featured in The 1619 Project. They called for the Cardinals to contribute to costs. Team executives attended meetings and eventually chose not to participate. In 2025, it was announced that a historical plaque would be placed on the Stadium East parking garage.

Other slave pens and slave markers that have been identified were converted into museums dedicated to African American history.

== See also ==
- Shockoe Bottom
- Lumpkin's Jail
- Bruin's Slave Jail
- List of American slave traders
- Slave markets and slave jails in the United States

== Bibliography ==
1. Anderson, Galusha. "The Story of a Border City During the Civil War". Boston: Little Brown and Company, 1908.
2. Bailey, Anne C. "They Sold Human Beings Here." The New York Times Magazine, February 20, 2020. https://www.nytimes.com/interactive/2020/02/12/magazine/1619-project-slave-auction-sites.html
3. "Four Slave Cells to Disappear When Stadium Site Is Cleared," "St. Louis Post-Dispatch", February 17, 1963.
4. Gerteis, Louis. "Civil War St. Louis". Lawrence: Kansas University Press, 2001.
5. Hoffman, Nicholas. "Monumental Recasting." https://monumentlab.com/bulletin/monumental-recasting.
6. Jack, Bryan. "'To Preserve the Historic Lore for Which St. Louis is Famous': The St. Louis Historic Markers Program and the Construction of Community Historical Memory." "The Confluence" 11, no. 1 (Fall 2019/Winter 2020): 12–23. https://www.lindenwood.edu/files/resources/the-confluence-fall-winter-2019.pdf.
7. National Park Service. "Slave Sales - Gateway Arch National Park." https://www.nps.gov/jeff/learn/historyculture/slave-sales.htm.
8. St. Louis Public Radio. "Curious St. Louis: Uncovering what remains of St. Louis' slave trading past." October 18, 2017. https://news.stlpublicradio.org/show/st-louis-on-the-air/2017-10-18/curious-louis-uncovering-what-remains-of-st-louis-slave-trading-past#stream/0.
9. "Stadium Construction Upsets Historians." The Southern Illinoisan, March 9, 2004. https://thesouthern.com/sports/stadium-construction-upsets-historians/article_8a39d903-bb29-591d-9886-6da49f8c853b.html.
10. White, John A. "Discovering African American St. Louis: A Guide to Historic Sites". St. Louis: Missouri Historical Society Press, 2002.
11. White, Jonathan W. "When Emancipation Finally Came, Slave Markets Took On a Redemptive Purpose." Smithsonian Magazine, February 26, https://www.smithsonianmag.com/history/when-emancipation-finally-came-slave-markets-took-redemptive-purpose-180968260/2018.
