= Slave depot =

Slave depot refers to a place used in the slave trade. It could mean:

- Slave depot, one of a number of slave pens along a route between a slave market and an ultimate destination
- Slave depot, a slave market
