= The Auction Block =

The Auction Block may refer to:

- The Auction Block (1926 film), an American silent comedy film
- The Auction Block (1917 film), an American silent drama film

== See also ==
- Slave Auction Block, Fredericksburg, a large stone in Fredericksburg, Virginia, used as an auction block in slave auctions
- Auction block
