= The Cage (Richmond, Virginia) =

Short-term lockup & slave jail

The Cage was a jail, often used as a slave jail, that was located at the northwest corner of 17th and Main in Richmond, Virginia, United States prior to and during the American Civil War. The Cage was a short-term lockup facility. Corporal punishment was also inflicted there.

== History ==
An early form of the Cage was in use as early as 1785. The original Cage was octagonal and was used "until Henrico County erected a new jail in 1820, when an arrangement was made by the City and the County to keep all prisoners in the County jail. This arrangement was continued until 1830, when the City built its own jail."

According to a major history of Richmond, the Cage was three stories tall and topped with a dome "with stocks and whipping post in the rear." The Cage was "open on three sides, except for iron gratings, and those within were visible to passers-by. The need for such a facility was stressed by a grand jury which found an excessive number 'of vagrants, beggars, free Negroes and runaway slaves' which 'daily infest the streets and by night plunder the inhabitants.'"

People of color who could not present free papers or a slave pass were sometimes placed in the Cage until their legal status could be ascertained. In 1853, when slave traders were in a dispute over a woman named Sally who was thought to be insane, the Richmond Dispatch reported, "Captain Wilkinson stated, that on two several occasions the watch found Sally sitting on the side walk and took her to the cage."

According one local historian, the Cage "was heavily used during the Civil War."
