= Slave markets and slave jails in the United States =

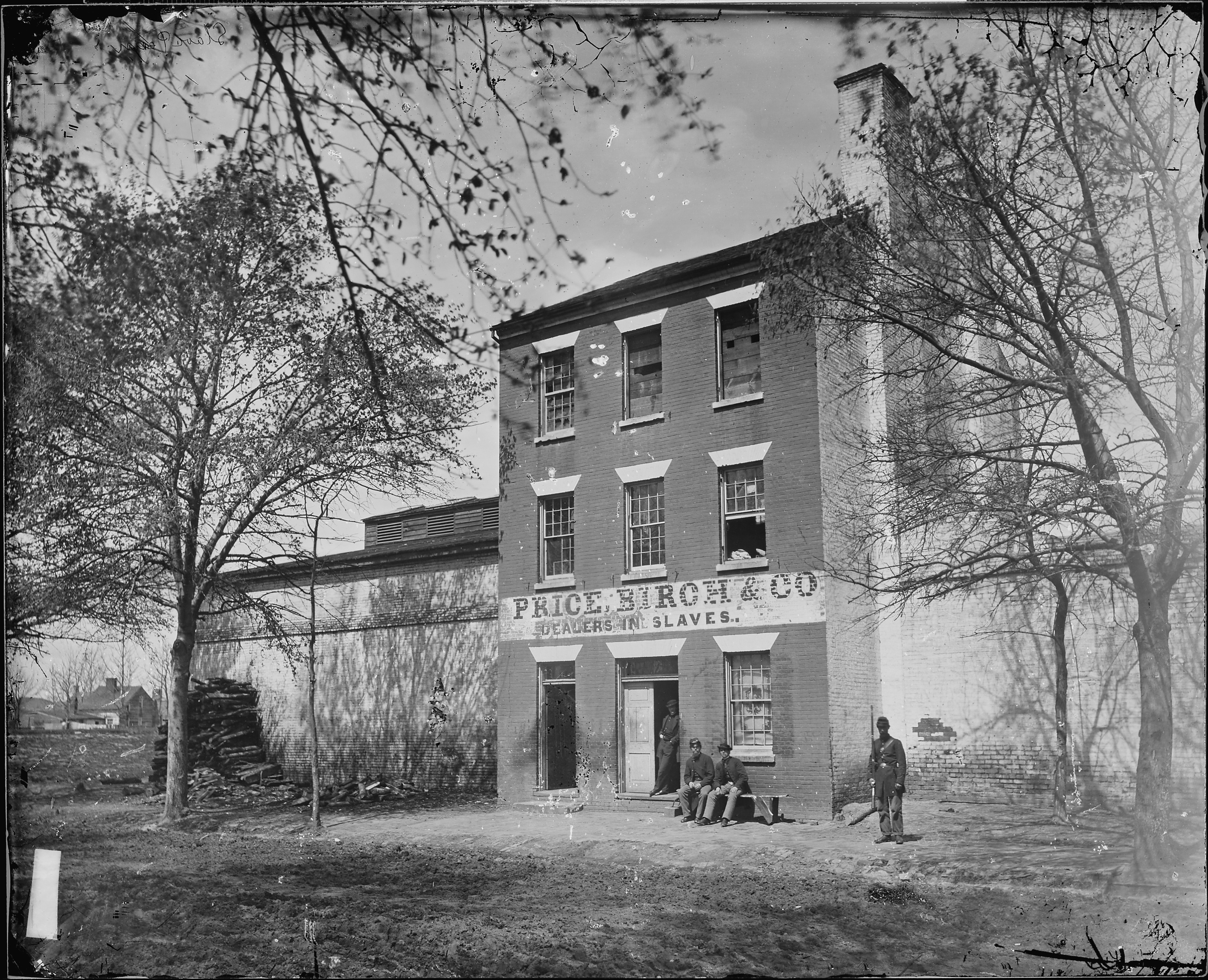
Price, Birch & Co., "dealers in slaves" Alexandria, Virginia, photographed c. 1862

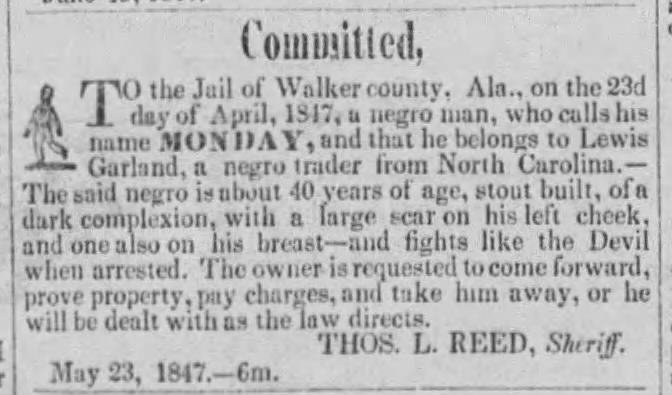
In addition to private jails, enslaved people were often held in public jails, such as a 40-year-old fugitive man named Monday who fought "like the Devil when arrested" and who was held in the jail of Walker County, Alabama (The Democrat, Huntsville, July 7, 1847)

Slave markets and slave jails in the United States were places used for the slave trade in the region, a practice inherited from the American colonial period, from the founding of the United States in 1776 until the total abolition of slavery in 1865. Slave pens, also known as slave jails, were used to temporarily hold enslaved people until they were sold, or to hold fugitive slaves, and sometimes even to "board" slaves while traveling. Slave markets were any place where sellers and buyers gathered to make deals. Some of these buildings had dedicated slave jails, others were negro marts to showcase the slaves offered for sale, and still others were general auction or market houses where a wide variety of business was conducted, of which "negro trading" was just one part. The term slave depot was commonly used in New Orleans in the 1850s.

Slave trading was often done in business clusters where many trading firms operated in close proximity. Such clusters existed on specific streets (such as Pratt Street in Baltimore, Adams Street in Memphis, or Cherry Street in Nashville), in specific neighborhoods (in the American Quarter in New Orleans, and at Shockoe Bottom in Richmond), or in settlements seemingly dedicated to serving planters seeking new agricultural laborers (such as Forks of the Road market in Natchez, Mississippi, and at Hamburg, South Carolina, across the river from Augusta, Georgia). Many thousands of other sales took place on the steps of county courthouses (to satisfy judgments, estates and claims), on large plantations, or anywhere else there was a slave owner who needed cash in order to settle a debt or pay off a bad bet.

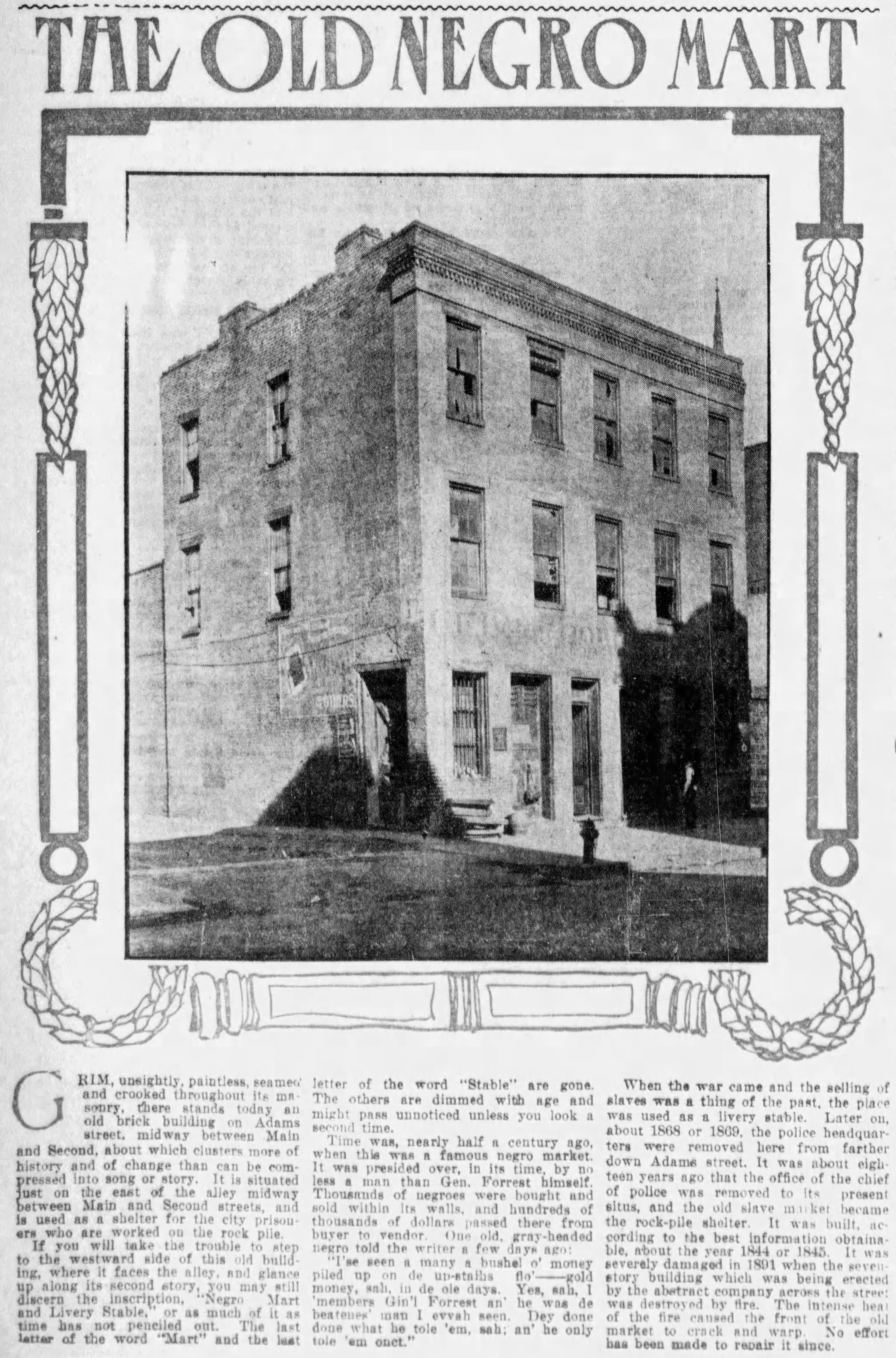
Claimed to be Nathan Bedford Forrest's slave pen ("The Old Negro Mart" Memphis Commercial Appeal, January 27, 1907)

A slave market could operate without a dedicated jail, and a jail could operate without an associated market. For example, the grand hotels of New Orleans, and the Artesian Basin in Montgomery, Alabama, were important slave markets not known for their prison facilities. A number of slave jails in the Upper South were used for holding people until slave traders had enough for a shipment south, but were only rarely the site of slave sales, in part because the profit for the trader was sure to be higher in the Deep South, closer to the labor-hungry plantations of the cotton and sugar districts.

== History ==
Dedicated marts, depots, and lockups were by no means ubiquitous, but the slave trade itself was: "The slave trade took place in nearly every town and city in the South. In most, however, the trade did not have a permanent physical location. Commonly, slaves were sold on court days, usually outdoors at a location near the courthouse, yet those cities with a large slave market had a significant infrastructure dedicated to the buying and selling of humans." New Orleans was the great slave market of the lower Mississippi watershed—with hundreds of traders and a score of slave pens—but there were also markets and sales "at Donaldsonville, Clinton, and East Baton Rouge in Louisiana; at Natchez, Vicksburg, and Jackson in Mississippi; at every roadside tavern, county courthouse, and crossroads across the Lower South."

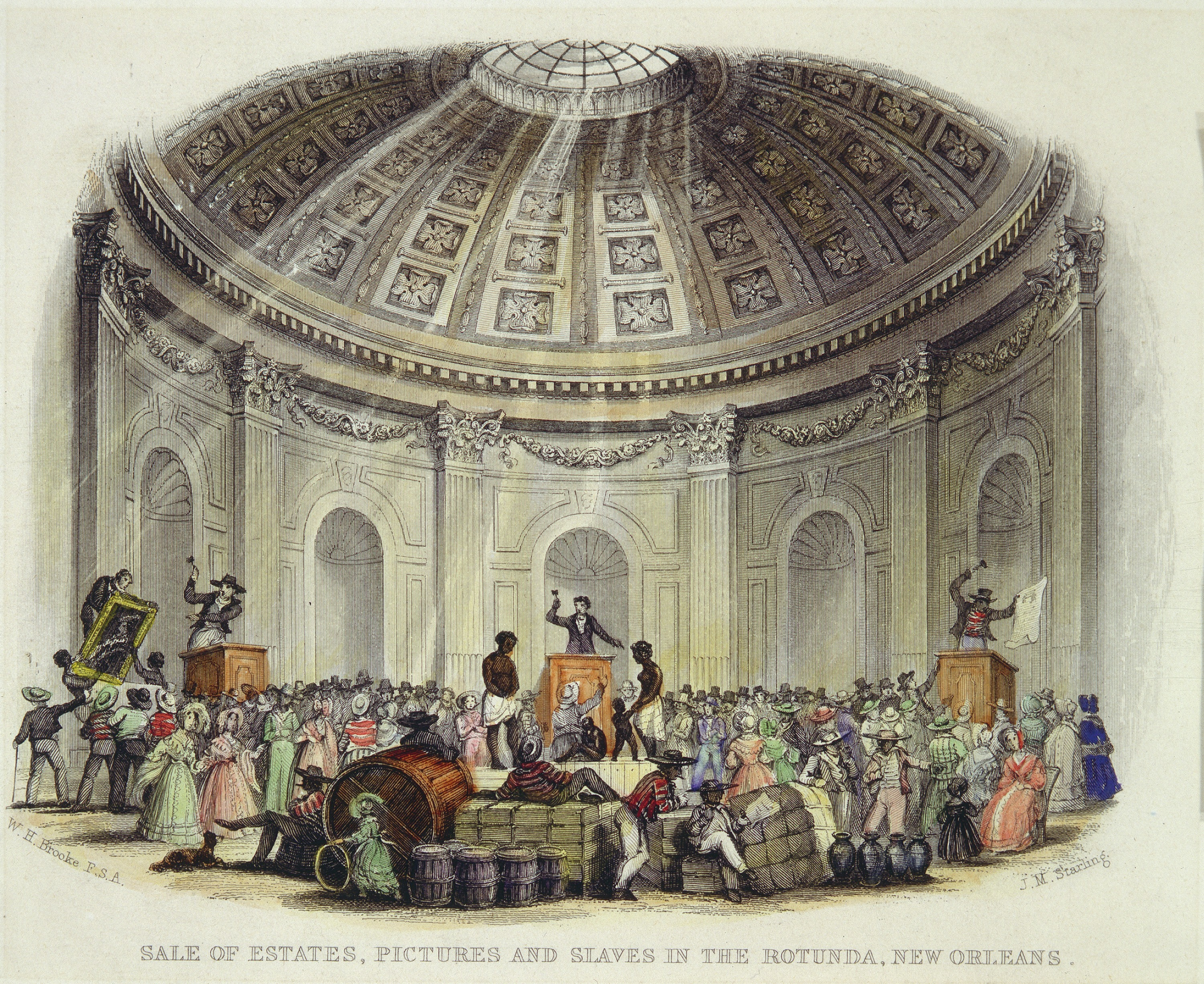
"Sale of Estates, Pictures and Slaves in the Rotunda at New Orleans" by William Henry Brooke from The Slave States of America (1842) by James Silk Buckingham depicts a slave sale at the St. Louis Hotel, sometimes called the French Exchange

Slave traders traveled to farms and small towns to buy enslaved people to bring to market. Slave owners also delivered people they wanted to dispense with. Enslaved people were placed in pens to await being sold, and they could become quite crowded. In New Orleans, most sales were made between September and May. Buyers visited the slave pen and inspected enslaved people prior to the sale. People were held until their means of transportation was arranged. They were transported in groups by boat, walked to their new owners, or a combination of the two. They were moved in groups in a coffle. This meant that people were chained together with iron rings around their necks which were fastened with wooden or iron bars. Men on horseback herded the groups, or coffles, to their destination. They used dogs, guns, and whips. Railroads brought a new, simpler means of travel that did not rely on the use of coffles.

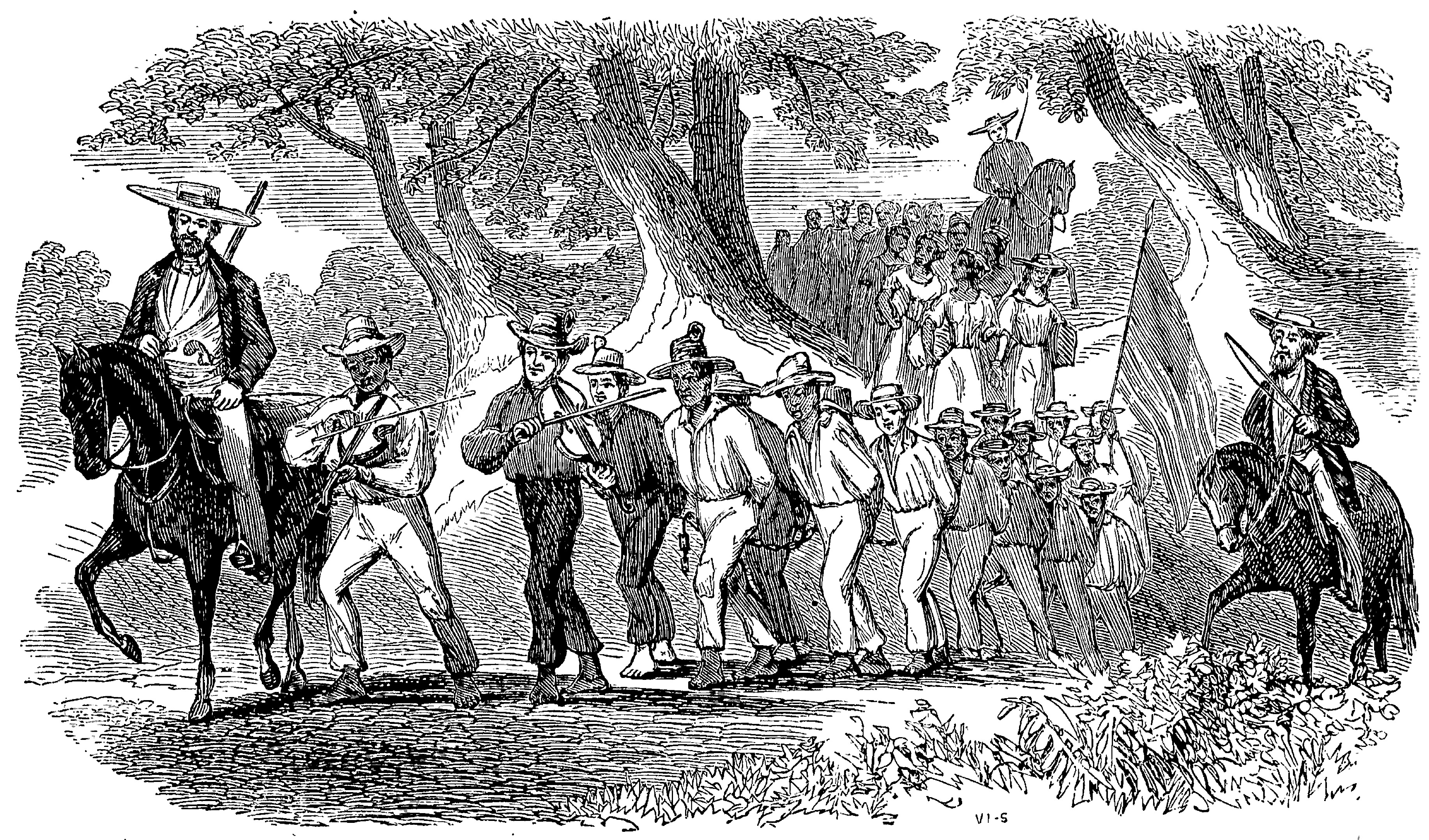
Coffle gang

In some cases, slave traders, like Franklin & Armfield, had a network of slave depots that were located along their routes. Circa 1833, an Appalachian newspaper complained about the slave traders traveling through the region with coffles, and reported that private jails had been built by slave traders at Baltimore, Washington, Norfolk, and near Fredericksburg. According to Nile's Weekly Register of Baltimore in the 1840s, "The procurement of from fifty to three hundred slaves is a work of days, sometimes of weeks or months. Many plantations must be visited by the trader and his agents. Then a variety of circumstances occasions necessary delays, before the gang can be put in motion for the south. During this period the slaves are secured by handcuffs, fetters, and chains, and put into some place of confinement. The national prison at Washington city, and the state prisons, are prostituted to this use when occasion requires. The more extensive slave-dealers have private prisons constructed expressly for this purpose."

Lumpkin's Jail, the largest in the state of Virginia, was a particularly inhumane place that resulted in people dying of starvation, illness, or beating. They were so cramped that they were sometimes on top of one another. There were no toilet facilities. Swedish writer Fredrika Bremer described slave pens she saw on her travels in America as "great garrets without beds, chairs or tables." Per Frederic Bancroft, "As a rule, in all such places, the floor was the only bed, a dirty blanket was the only covering, a miscellaneous bundle the only pillow. A 1928 history described jail cells built on the Maryland farm of trader George Kephart: "...Mr. Kephart was probably the largest slavedealer in the county. He had two underground jails built where he kept the unruly, as well as a brick jail above ground." Some jails may have been tidy and officious operations, but many or most were not. Henry Bibb described one jail where he was held as repugnant "on account of the filth and dirt of the most disagreeable kind...there were bedbugs, fleas, lice and mosquitoes in abundance to contend with. At night we had to lie down on the floor in this filth. Our food was very scanty, and of the most inferior quality. No gentleman's dog would eat what we were compelled to eat or starve." St. Louis slave trader Bernard M. Lynch offered jailing services to owners for 37½ cents per slave per day.

The owners or operators of private slave jails were not necessarily the legal owners of everyone incarcerated within, and the business of jailing was distinct from the business of trading. For instance Matthew Garrison, who was both a slave trader and jail owner in Louisville, Kentucky, submitted a bill for "boarding slaves" to the county chancery court adjudicating a dispute over estate slaves, while W. H. DeJarnatt advertised that four slaves he was listing for sale could "be seen at the house of M. Garrison".

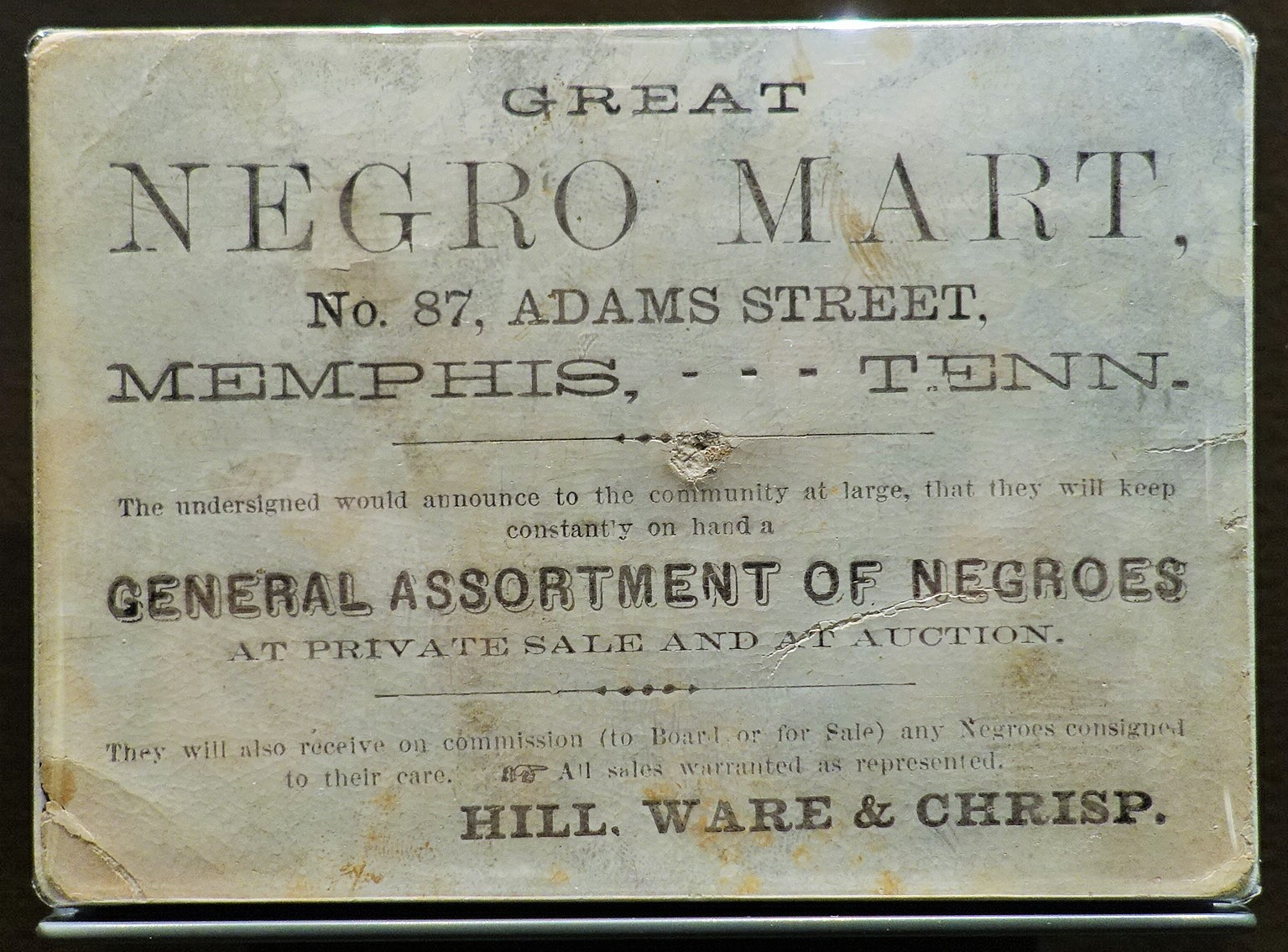
"Great Negro Mart" sign: This card dates to about 1860, this building had been occupied by Nathan Bedford Forrest's slave market for most of the 1850s but in 1859 he sold it for US$30,000 (equivalent to $1,075,000 in 2025) to his former partner Byrd Hill (National Museum of African American History and Culture)

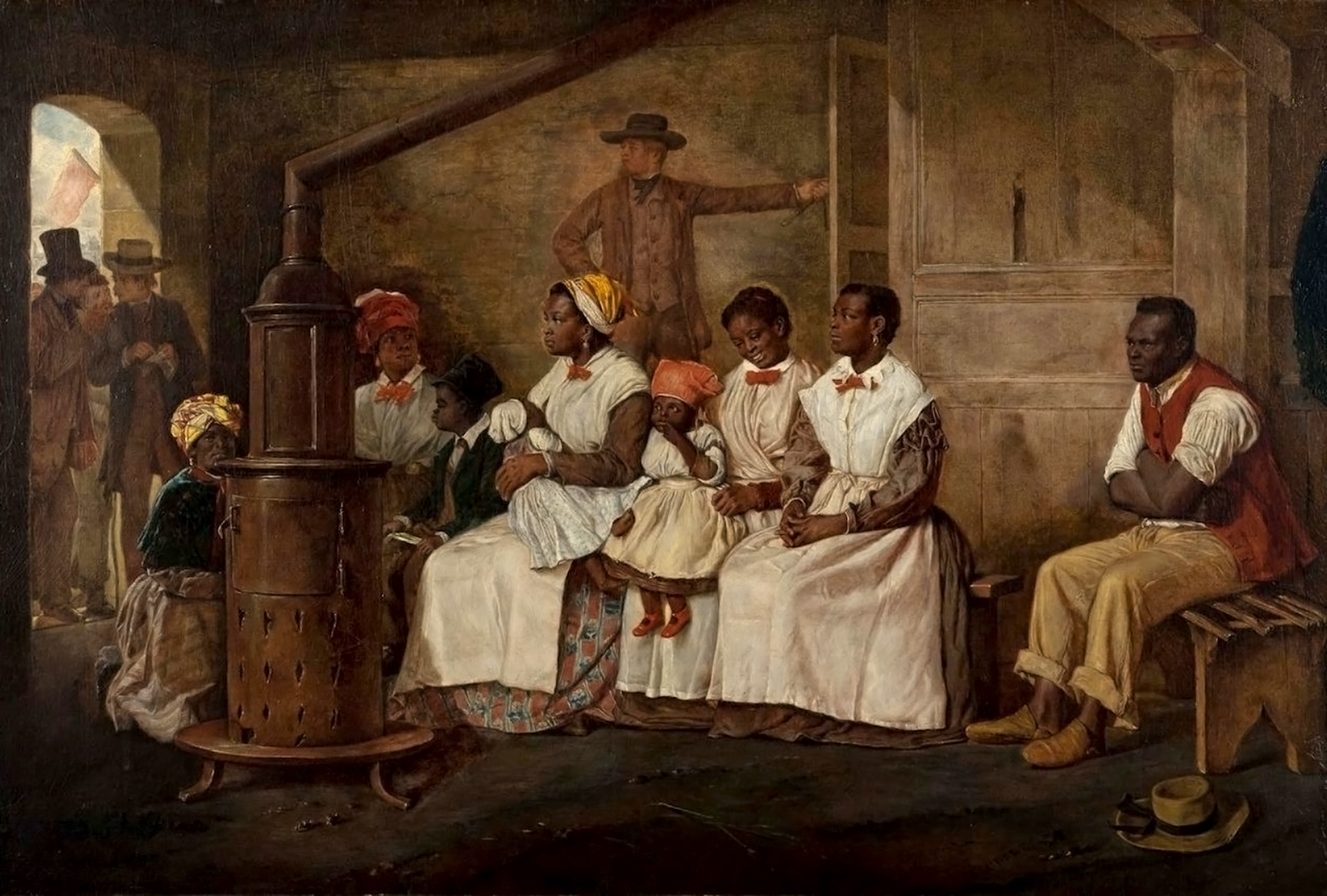
Slaves Waiting for Sale by Eyre Crowe (1853)

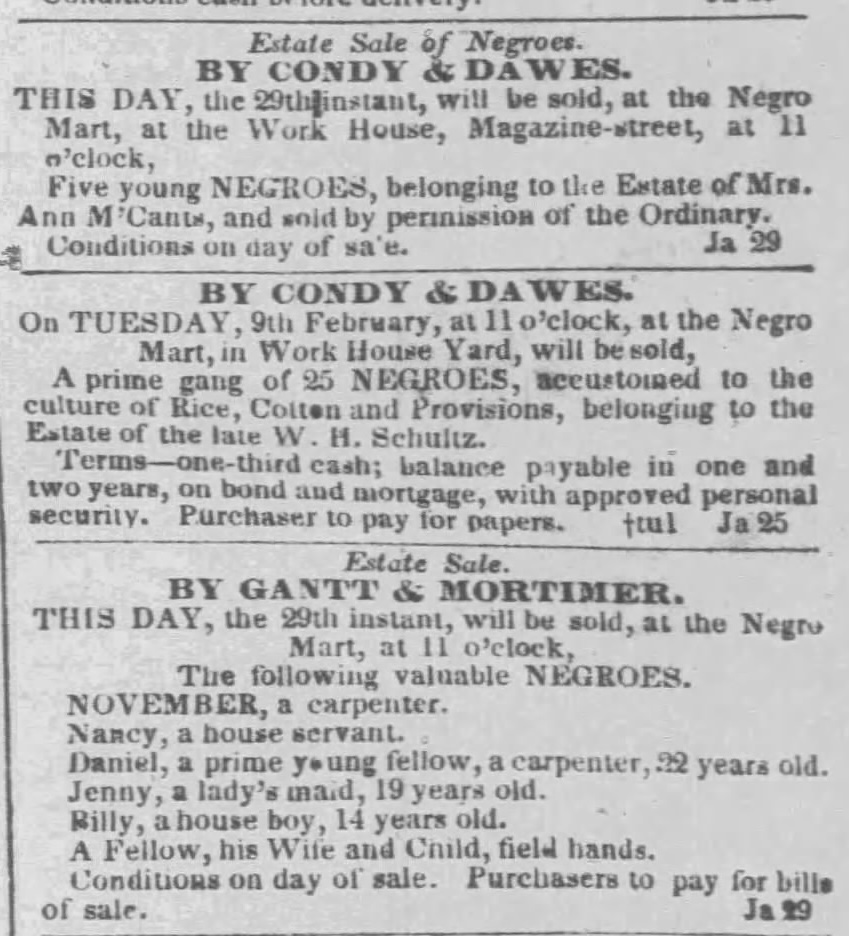
Three newspaper listings for estate sales to be held at the negro mart attached to the Charleston Workhouse yard (Charleston Daily Courier, January 29, 1841)

A negro mart was usually a type of urban retail market, usually consisting of a dedicated showroom and/or a workyard, a jail, and storerooms or kitchens for food. Negro marts were urban "clearinghouses" that both acquired enslaved people from more rural districts and sold people for use as farm, skilled, or domestic labor. The term negro mart was most commonly used in Charleston, South Carolina, but can also be found in Memphis, Tennessee, multiple locations in Georgia, et al. In the 1850s, future Confederate military leader Nathan Bedford Forrest operated a heavily advertised negro mart on Adams Street in Memphis. In January 1860, the New York Times reported that the Forrest & Jones negro mart in Memphis had collapsed and caught fire; two people died but the bills of sale for people, "amounting in the aggregate to US$400,000 (equivalent to about $14,333,330 in 2025)" were salvaged. A description of "the negro mart of Poindexter & Little" in New Orleans, Louisiana states: "In this mart the Negroes were classified and seated on benches, as goods are arranged on shelves in a well-regulated store. The cooks, mechanics, farm-hands, house-girls, seamstresses, washwomen, barbers, and boys each had their own place." During the Civil War, Gideon J. Pillow wrote a complaint letter to the effect that U.S. Army troops had robbed him of his slaves, and killed or jailed his overseers; he wanted someone to check if the women and children, particularly, were "confined in the Ware house or Negro Mart."

It was not uncommon to hold sales or auctions outdoors in the pre-air-conditioning South; the plaza north of the Charleston Exchange may be the most enduring and notable of these locations. Similarly, rather than depending on candles, kerosene, whale oil, or gaslights, the noon-to-three trading hours of the St. Louis Hotel in New Orleans probably took advantage of the brightest hours of natural light through the rotunda windows. Outdoor slave markets were sometimes controversial. Charleston banned outdoor sales in 1856 and the traders protested that the ban might subtly send a message that there was something wrong with buying and selling people. And in 1837 a correspondent named D wrote to the New Orleans Times-Picayune complaining of being inconvenienced by the "practice which has been recently adopted by negro traders, I know not who, of parading their slaves for sale, on the narrow trottoir in front of the City Hotel, Common street...I have very frequently found much difficulty in making my way through the rank and file of men, women and children, there daily exhibited."

Many, if not most, hotels in southern cities were also de facto slave markets and slave jails. In 1884, a former slave trader named Jack Campbell told a reporter "Go into any Southern hotel that was built before the war and ask them to let you go down into the cellars. See if you don't find these old cells where the servants of travelers were shut up at night." When Reverend Thomas James, a missionary and freedman from New York, was granted permission by the U.S. Army to liberate Louisville's slave jails in February 1865 he found hundreds of people still in the pens, "many confined in leg irons," and nine more in the National Hotel.

== Home and plantation jails ==
Some slave owners may have had jails on their land for just their own personal slaves. A photo album of historic spots in Mississippi that was created about 1937 by the WPA Federal Writers' Project has a photo of a pleasant-looking house with a caption that reads, "Above: Sea Glen, Hancock County, Old Claiborne Plantation. It was here that J. F. H. Claiborne lived during the early 1800s and where he attempted the commercial production of sea island cotton. The old slave dungeon and the cotton press remain." This house was as originally built by people enslaved by Louis Boisdore around 1800. Historian Orville W. Taylor described a surviving plantation jail in his Negro Slavery in Arkansas (1958): "A well-preserved slave jail still stands on Yellow Bayou Plantation in Chicot County, owned during slavery days by the Craig family. There are no contemporary references to the jail, but the building itself bears ample evidence of the purposes for which it was used. And it could only have been used as a plantation jail, for the nearest town, Lake Village, then a mere hamlet, is five miles away. The jail is about thirty-two feet long by twenty-four feet wide, constructed of six-inch-square rough-sawed oak timbers notched at the corners and fastened together at frequent intervals with large iron spikes. Interior partitions and ceilings are of the same construction. There are four compartments in the jail: two small cells at one end, a narrow entrance hall running the width of the building in the center, and a large cell at the other end. The interior subdivision evidently was to permit segregation of male and female slaves, and also to provide a place for the guard. Small square windows between the center hall and each of the cells permitted passage of food and water without opening the cell doors. Each cell has iron rings fastened to the walls for use in chaining prisoners. The few small exterior windows are double ironbarred, one set of bars recessed into the logs and the other bolted to the outside; the wooden-barred entrance door is also double, giving greater security. All of the hardware is made of heavy, hand-forged iron. The jail is so massive and well-constructed that breaking out of it would have been very difficult."

== Impact on American capitalism ==
New economic history research shows that slave markets and slave prisons were not just centers for buying and selling people, but also formed part of the financial system of the southern United States. Slaves were used as collateral for loans, to secure debts, and to make investments. The expansion of slave markets was directly related to the development of the cotton industry, the banking system, and domestic trade in the United States, and played a significant role in the accumulation of capital in the decades before the Civil War.

== After slavery ==
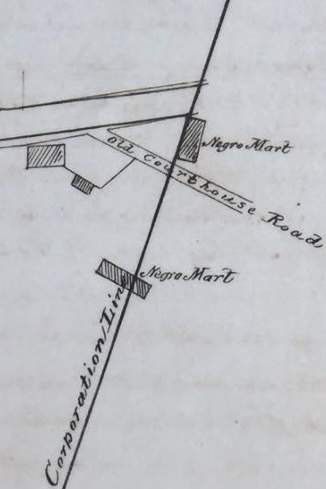
Slave markets labeled on an 1854 map of the Forks of the Road in Natchez, Mississippi

The Smithsonian magazine states that "[t]hese were sites of brutal treatment and unbearable sorrow, as callous and avaricious slave traders tore apart families, separating husbands from wives, and children from their parents." During the Civil War, slave pens were used by the Union Army to imprison Confederate soldiers. For instance, slave pens were used for this purpose in St. Louis, Missouri, and Alexandria, Virginia. In Natchez, Mississippi, the Forks of the Road slave market was used by the Union soldiers to offer the formerly enslaved protection and freedom. In 2021 the site was made part of the Natchez National Historical Park.

Old slave pens were also repurposed for worship and education. In Lexington, Kentucky, Lewis Robards' slave jail was used as a Congregational church by African Americans. A freedmen's seminary, now Virginia Union University, was established in Lumpkin's Jail. Known as the "devil's half acre", a founder of the seminary James B. Simmons said that it would now be "God's half acre". A slave pen in Montgomery, Alabama became Dexter Avenue Baptist Church. A site formerly called A. Bryan's Negro Mart in Georgia, was commandeered by the U.S. military at the conclusion of the Civil War. It was later described as having four stars on the sign out front; the windows of the upper stories had iron grates, and among the abandoned detritus were "bills of sale for slaves by the hundreds," business correspondence, "handcuffs, whips, and staples for tying, etc." The building turned into a school for formerly enslaved children.

== Notable markets and jails ==
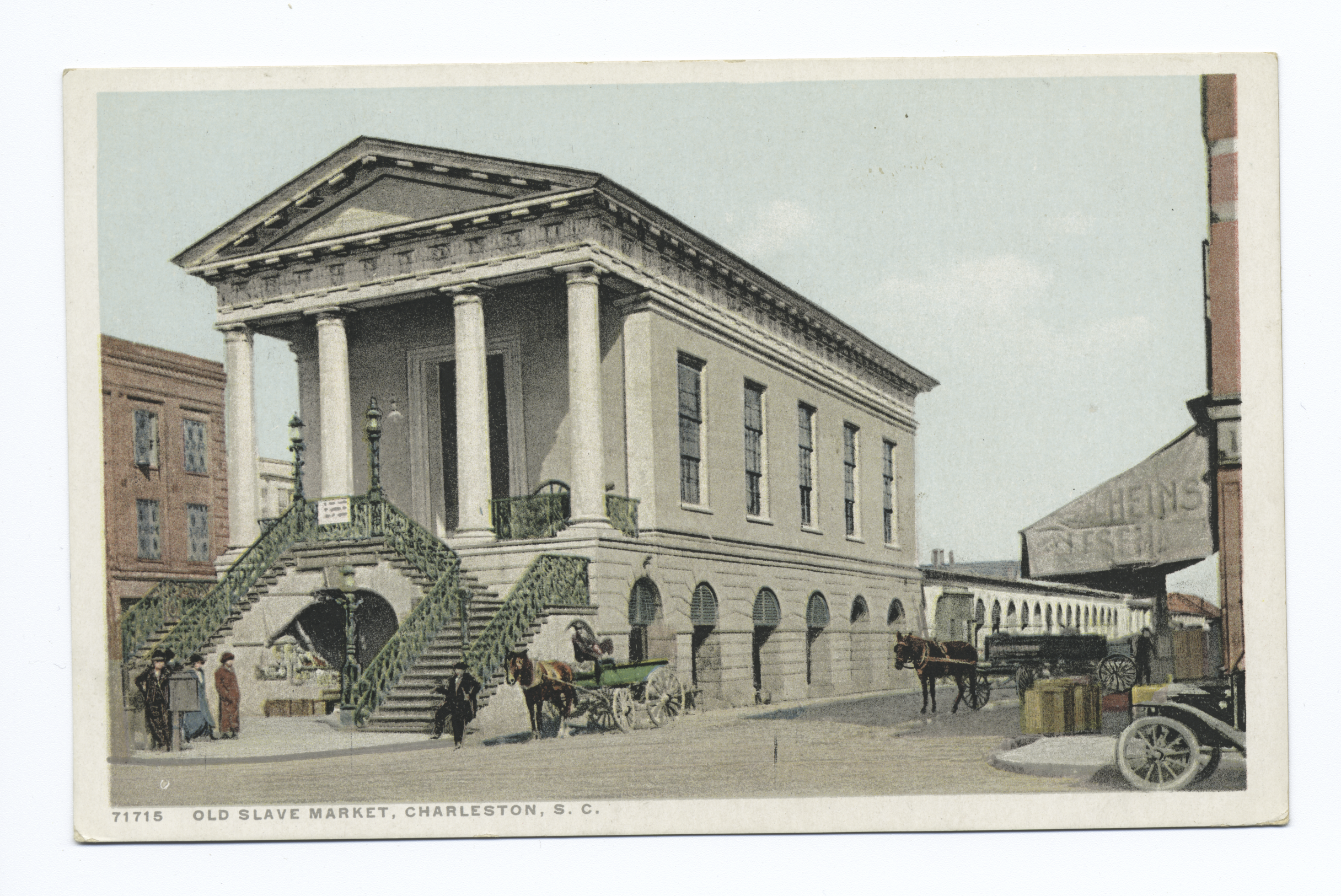
"Old Slave Market, Charleston, S.C." postcard of Charleston Exchange by Detroit Publishing Co., image dated 1913–1918

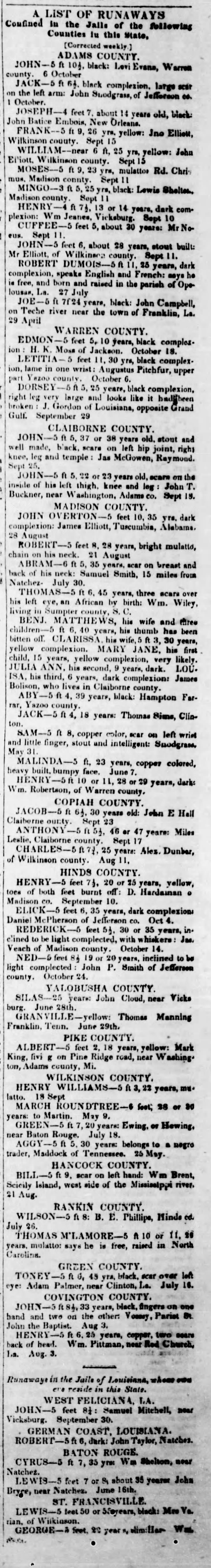
"A List of Runaways Confined in the Jails of this State," Mississippi Free Trader, December 11, 1835

This is a list of notable buildings, structures, and landmarks (etc.), that were used in the slave trade in the United States. Different markets may well have been known for different "products". One historian wrote of New Orleans, "It was in the rotunda of the St. Louis Hotel that pulchritudinous slave girls, usually far removed in complexion from the sable hue of the typical slave women, were oftenest to be obtained. The auctioneers' stands were solid blocks of masonry placed between the lofty columns which supported the domed roof. At one side of the rotunda were rooms where slaves might be confined temporarily, when necessary, or where men and women might be taken to undergo inspection by prospective purchasers more detailed than was possible in public. Hamilton, who was in the United States in 1843, and published a book about what he saw in New Orleans, adds a final touch: 'When a woman is sold, the auctioneer usually puts his audience in a good humor by a few indecent jokes...'"

- Artesian Basin (outdoor sales), Montgomery, Alabama
- Bar-room of the St. Charles Hotel, New Orleans
- Brown's Speculator House (slave jail?), Montgomery, Alabama
- Bruin's Slave Jail
- Charleston Workhouse and Negro Mart
- Cheapside Park, Lexington, Kentucky
- Charleston Exchange (outdoor sales, plaza north of building)
- E. P. Legg's jail, District of Columbia
- Forks of the Road slave market, Natchez, Mississippi
- Forrest's jail, Memphis
- Franklin and Armfield Office, Alexandria
- Hamburg, South Carolina slave market
- John Montmollin Warehouse, Savannah
- John W. Smith's jail, District of Columbia
- Lumpkin's Jail, Richmond
- Lynch's slave pen, St. Louis
- Mason County, Kentucky slave pen
- Nashville, Tennessee slave market
- New Orleans slave market
- Old Charleston Jail
- Old Market (Louisville, Georgia)
- Old Slave Market, St. Augustine (disputed)
- Old Slave Mart, Charleston
- Poindexter & Little § Slave depot, New Orleans
- Royal Oak, Woodville, Mississippi
- Slave Auction Block, Fredericksburg
- St. Louis Hotel, New Orleans
- The Cage, Richmond
- Woodroof's jail, Lynchburg, Virginia
- Woolfolk's jail, Baltimore
- The Yellow House, Washington, D.C.

== See also ==
- Charleston Workhouse Slave Rebellion
- List of American slave traders
- List of African-American historic places
- Red flag (American slavery)
- Tavern trader
- Nineteenth-century American county courthouse architecture § County jails and sheriff's residences
- Torture of slaves in the United States
