= Nineteenth-century American county courthouse architecture =

Design of American county courthouses in the 1800s

Nineteenth-century American county courthouse architecture was used in buildings designed to house judicial and administrative functions in styles such as Federal, Neoclassical, Italianate, Second Empire, and Romanesque Revival, which were adapted to local building materials and styles to accommodate local needs. Over the course of the nineteenth century, the typical American county courthouse became more specialized than its eighteenth century predecessor, featuring increased usage of interior passageways and multiple levels and stairwells to facilitate a greater level of formality to court proceedings than could often be achieved through earlier examples which were centered around a single room on the ground floor. The gradual replacement of courtroom fittings associated with the English common law with those associated with American adversarial statute law, along with the use of clock towers, statuary, turrets, domes, and other architectural features became increasingly central to the iconography of local American public life, which represented at once the ideal of equal and impartial justice before the law in criminal and civil disputes, as well as the more wealth based and paternalistic ideal of justice represented by such cases as probations of estates, recording of deeds and property boundaries, assessments of taxes, enforcements of debts, evictions, and transfers of slaves.

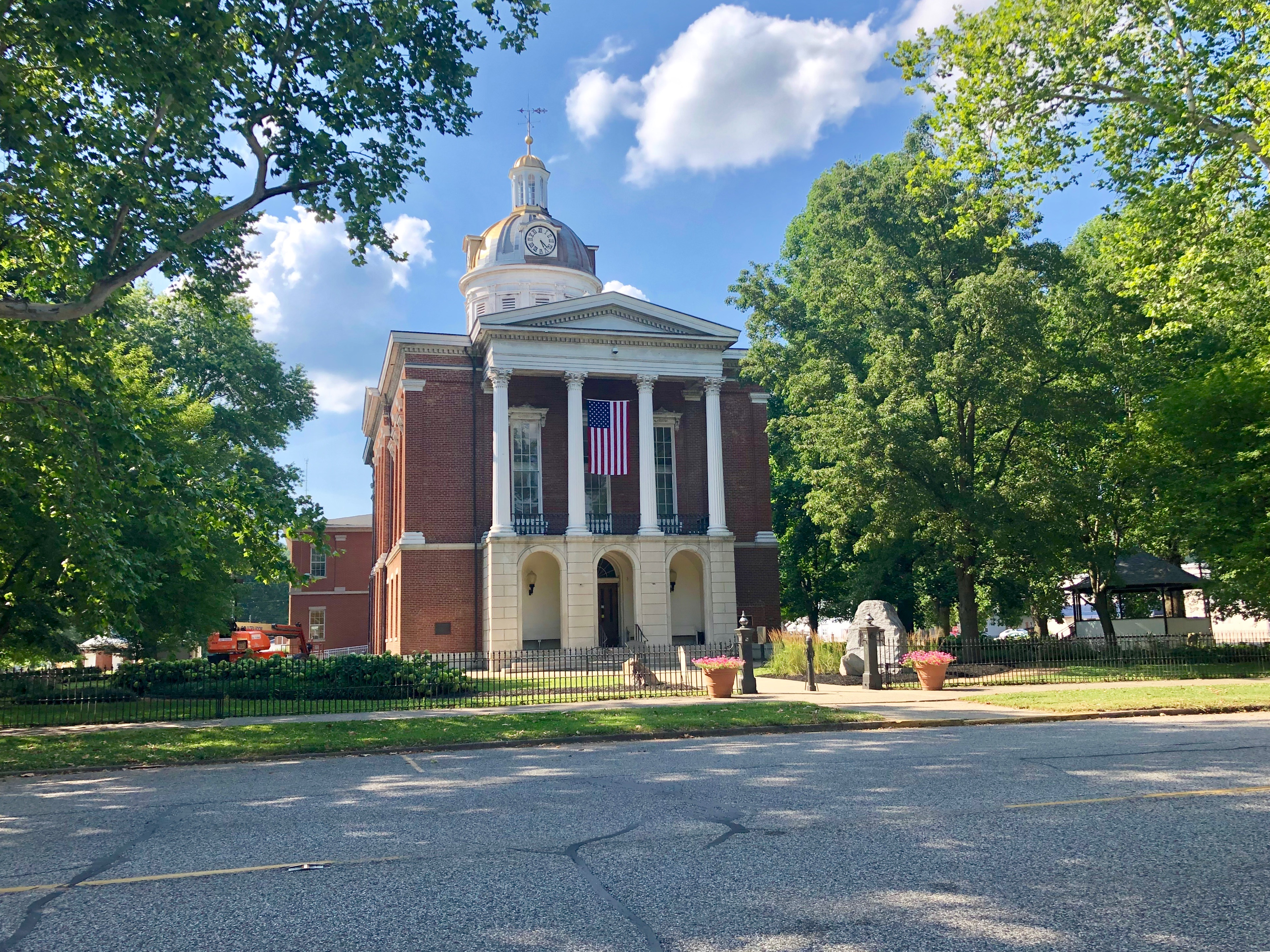
Switzerland County Courthouse , Vevay, Indianas

== Early examples ==
American county courthouses at the beginning of the nineteenth century were often a single story high, and centered around a single courtroom. Access to the courtroom could be directly through the main exterior entrance, with no interior passageways. The courtroom could be adjoined to other rooms, such as clerk's offices and deliberation rooms for magistrates and jurors. As a county grew in population and more revenue was collected from taxes, an early log or frame courthouse might have been replaced with a more substantial brick structure. Some early courthouses were attached to the county jail, while other counties might have had a free standing jail with perhaps only two or three cells.

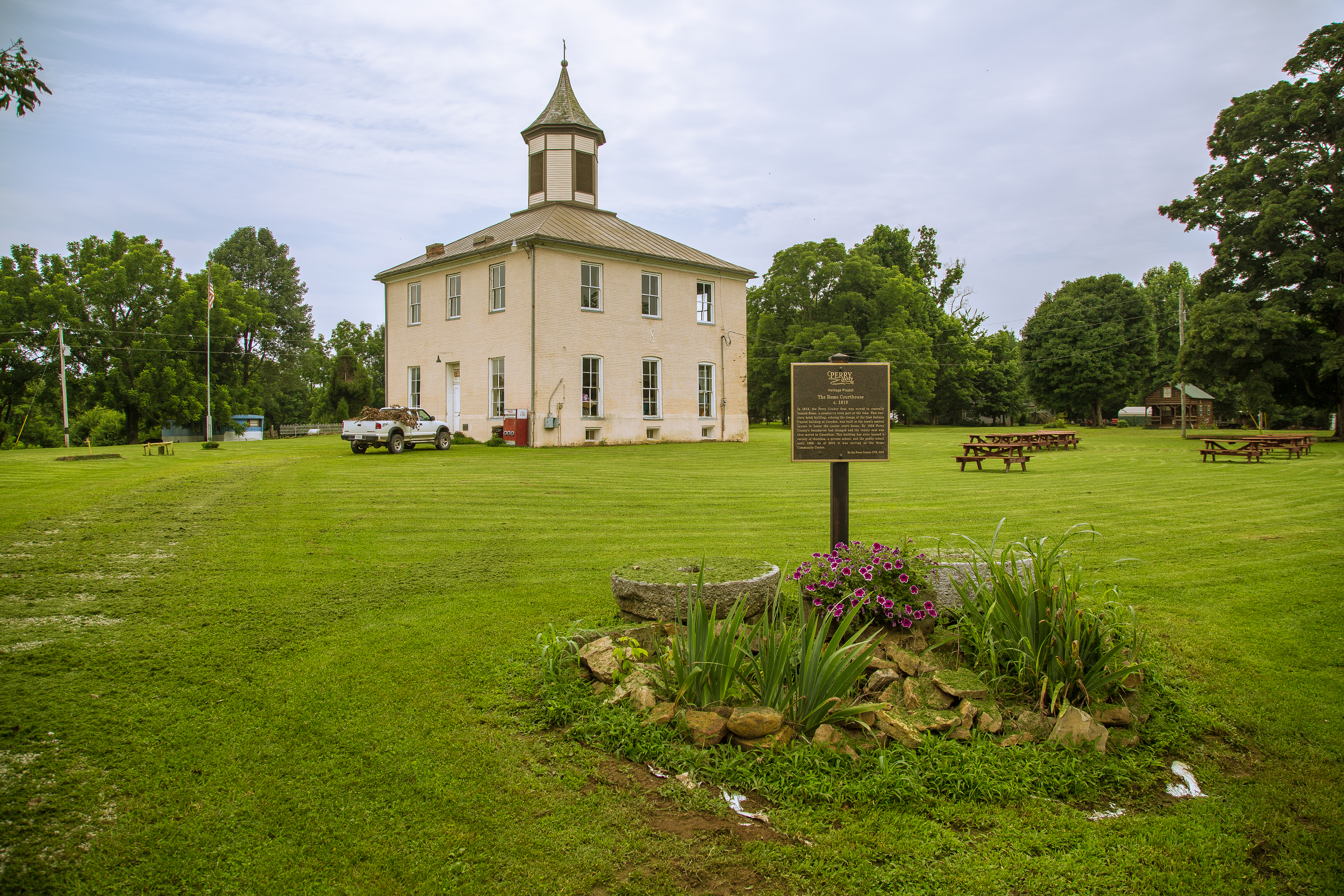
Old Perry County Courthouse, Rome, Indiana

Over the course of the first half of the nineteenth century, it became increasingly common for one story courthouses to be replaced with two story structures. Generally, the ground level contained offices, such as for the county clerk and sheriff, as well as other rooms such as judges' chambers and jury deliberation rooms, while the courtroom occupied the majority of the upper level. The elevated courtroom provided more formality to the court proceedings, as it often necessitated the inclusion of additional stairways to the back or sides of the building, opening additional circulation pathways to the courtroom for the judges, jurors, court staff, and prisoners. This could have the effect of reducing the amount of ex parte communication the attorneys and litigants could have with the judges and jurors, thus increasing the importance of written motions and oral advocacy to the adversarial court proceedings at the expense of the more social and hierarchical English common law, in which eighteenth century courtrooms allowed for more interaction between the parties by allowing them to share common entrances to the court facilities. As plaintiffs generally sat at a table in the well of the courtroom closer to the jury box, and defendants typically sat at a table closer to the sheriff's box and custody suite, generally, adversarial courthouses with only one courtroom on a level were often centered around a clerk's office on the right side of the ground floor, as viewed from the front, and a sheriff's office on the left. Each of these offices could contain stairwells, with the stairwell inside the clerk's office leading to the jury deliberation area, adjacent to the right side of the courtroom, as viewed from the front of the building, containing the jury box and plaintiff's table, and the stairwell in the sheriff's office leading to the custody suite, adjacent to the left side of the courtroom, as viewed from the front of the building, containing the sheriff's box and defendant's table. At the front of the building could be the staircase and entrance to the courtroom for the public, and at the back of the building could be a stairwell leading to the judge's chamber and robing room, adjacent to the judge's bench at the back of the courtroom. Smaller courthouses might have only had a single stairwell to the upstairs courtroom, for a single circulation pathway shared by the public, litigants, prisoners, witnesses, jurors, and judges. This arrangement would have been cheaper to construct for smaller counties and would have allowed the courthouse to occupy a smaller exterior envelope if space was limited, as the separation of circulation pathways during the nineteenth century was considered desirable but not essential.

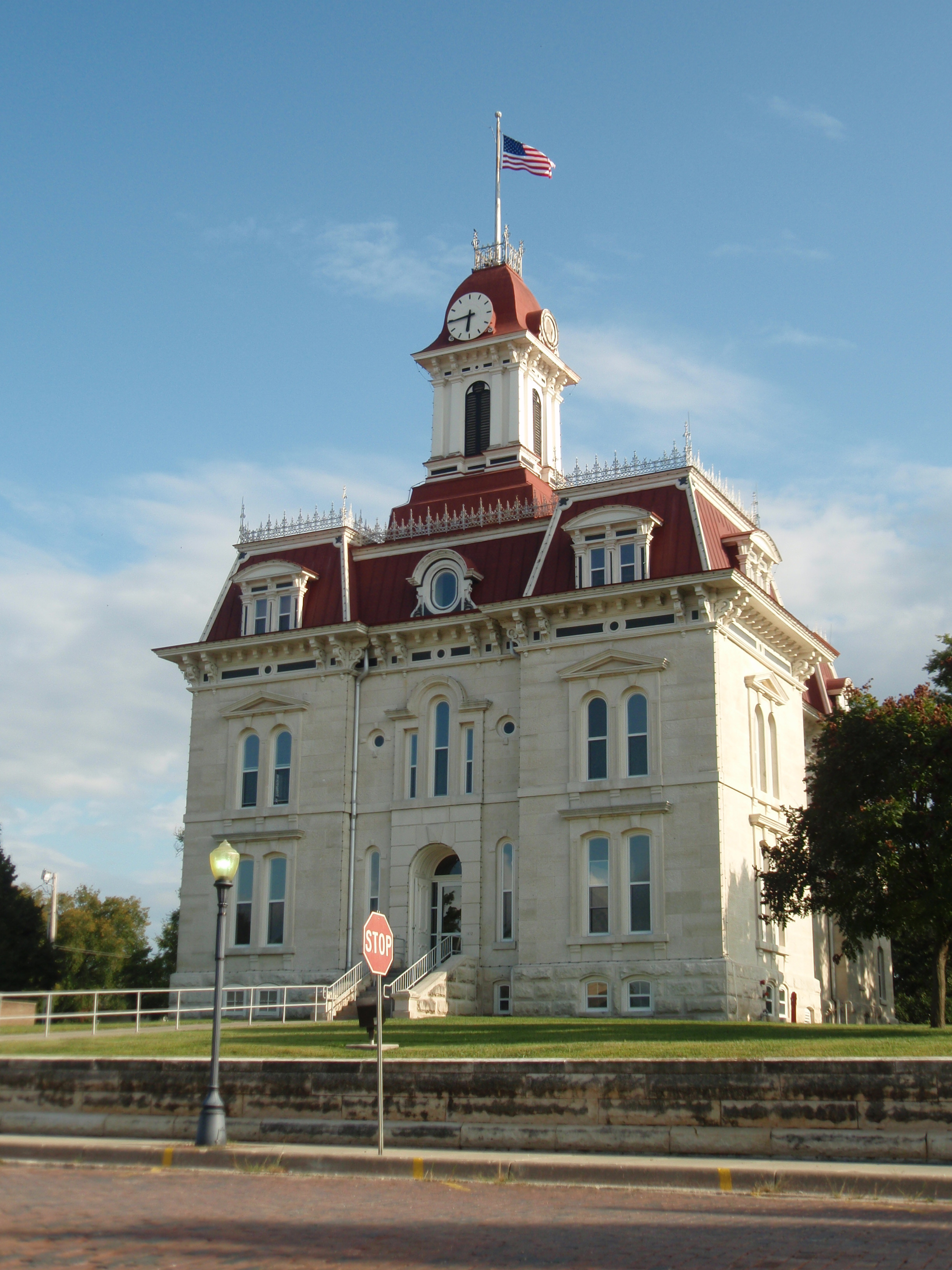
Chase County Courthouse, Cottonwood Falls, Kansas

During the second half of the nineteenth century, courthouses for larger counties continued to grow larger, often with the main courtroom occupying space on both the second and third levels, with a balcony on the upper level of the courtroom to provide additional seating for the public. The use of specialized architectural features continued to grow, including bell and clock towers, cupolas, turrets, domes, and statues, often depicting a blindfolded woman holding a sword and scales, symbolizing equal justice under the law by weighing the arguments of the parties against each other rather than the relationships between the judges and the litigants in determining how to apply the law to individual cases.

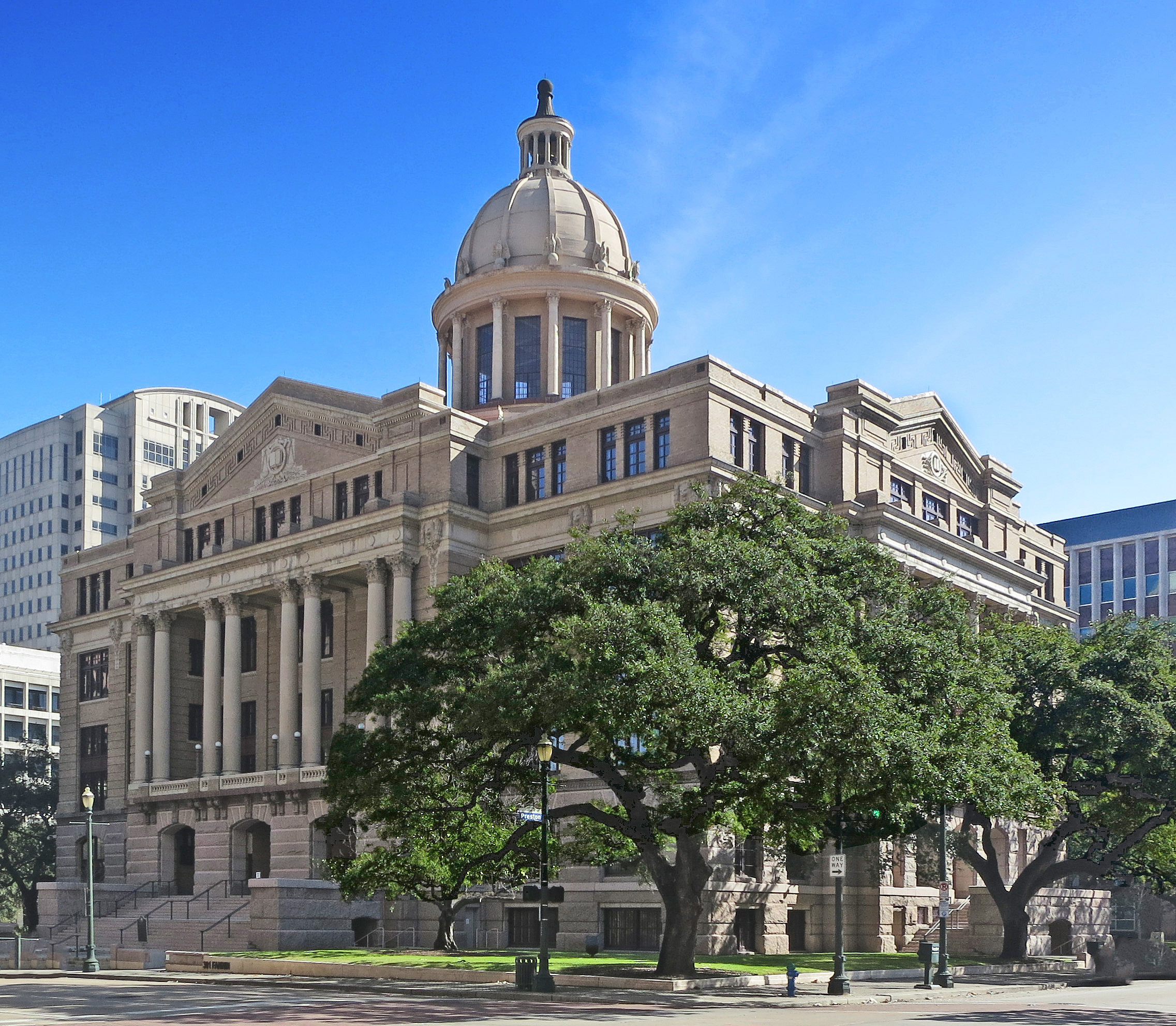
Old Harris County Courthouse, Houston, Texas

== Adversarial courtroom fittings ==
During the nineteenth century, professional judges gradually replaced volunteer magistrates as the primary adjudicating authority to decide court cases. Counties gradually grew smaller as western areas were settled with lower population density, but residents still expected to access county services within a reasonable travel distance, and fewer business people and plantation owners had enough wealth, free time, and education to volunteer as county magistrates. As a result, the quality of the county magistrates judging court cases declined over the first half of the nineteenth century and during westward expansion, until by the time of the civil war, most states had abolished the traditional system of a panel of volunteer magistrates in each county with the retention of a single attorney to act as the judge. These judges could preside over a district or circuit comprising multiple counties, and had original and appellate jurisdiction over a wide variety of cases. The abolition of magistrates eliminated the need for more than one seat to preside over the courtroom, and by the middle of the nineteenth century, most American courthouses had replaced the traditional magistrates' bench with a box with one seat for the judge.

Next to the judge's bench would typically be seating for the court clerk, witnesses, and jurors. Unlike eighteenth century county courthouses, where the jury would typically sit in the center of the well of the courtroom, directly in front of the magistrates, the nineteenth century jury box was typically to the side of the courtroom, adjacent to the door to the jury deliberation room. The height of the benches for the attorneys on an elevated platform symbolized their social standing in the court. During the eighteenth century, attorneys typically sat on benches affixed at floor level, while magistrates, sheriffs, and jailers sat on an elevated platform, often two or three feet above the floor level. At the beginning of the nineteenth century, it was becoming increasingly common for courtrooms to contain an elevated platform in the center of the well for the attorneys, underscoring the increasing emphasis on the learned argument as a basis for authority in the courtroom, while the boxes for the sheriff and jailer, who no longer needed to become a magistrate to be elected as a separate county officer, were lowered closer to the floor level. Over the course of the nineteenth century, it became increasingly common for the litigants to sit at a table with their attorneys in the well of the courtroom instead of standing in the public gallery for the duration of the proceedings, and these tables were typically incorporated into the courtroom at floor level. By the end of the nineteenth century, it was common for the judge's box to be the only piece of elevated furniture in the courtroom, with perhaps the clerk's workstation and witness stand being slightly elevated adjacent to it.

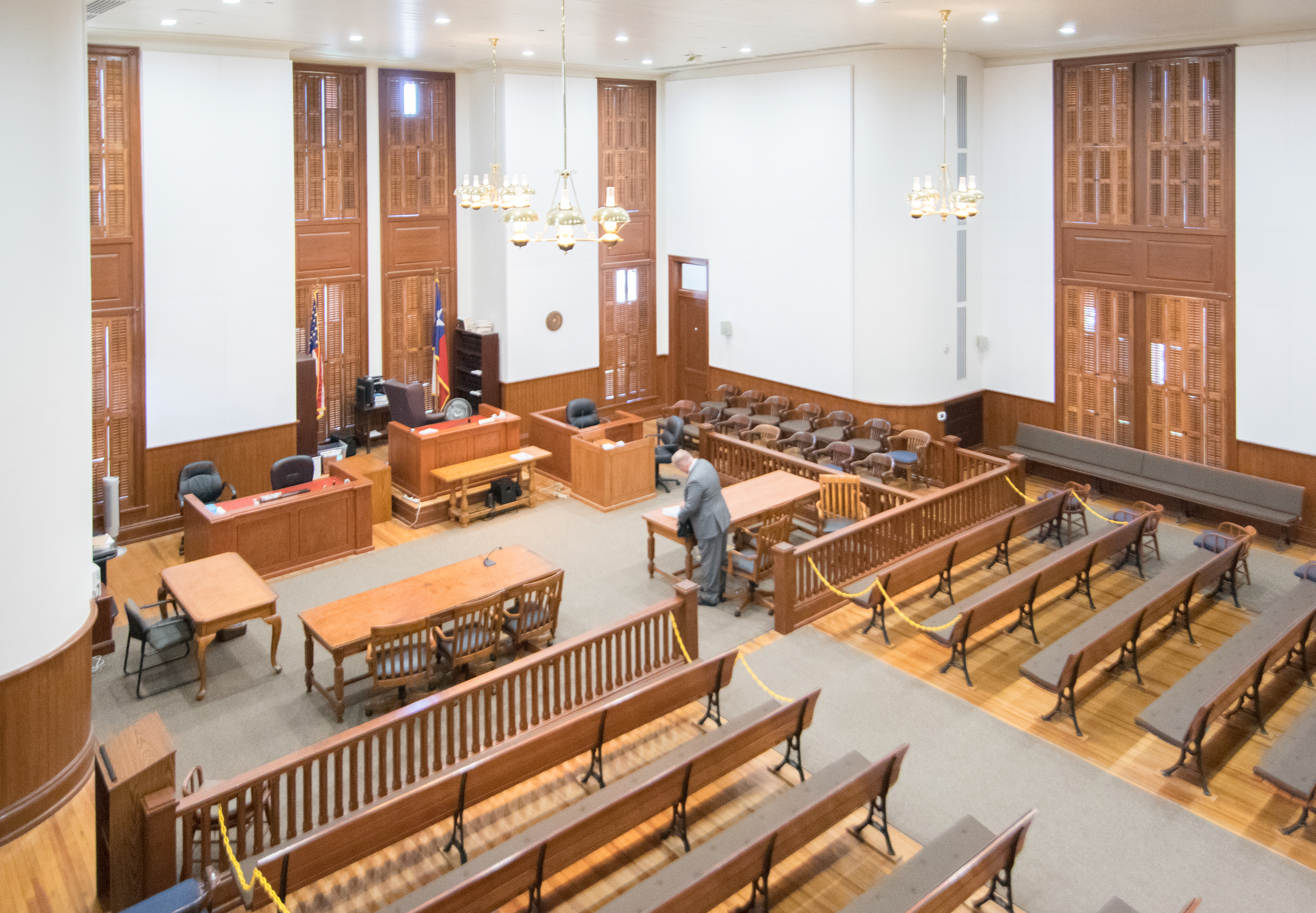
Wharton County Courthouse, Wharton, Texas

The use of seating also increased in the nineteenth century courtroom, and terms that historically indicated that the parties to the court should remain standing during proceedings, such as the bystander's gallery and the witness stand, were gradually superseded with the inclusion of chairs in the witness stand and the public gallery. However, it became customary for everyone in attendance to the courtroom to stand up when the judge entered the courtroom, upon which the judge would then typically tell everyone to have a seat, as a vestige of earlier English common law courtrooms which only provided seating for the magistrates, jurors, clerks, attorneys, sheriffs, and jailers to facilitate standing up out of respect for the court.

== Architectural styles ==
Nineteenth century county courthouses were built in a variety of architectural styles, including Federal, Neoclassical, Italianate, Second Empire, and Romanesque Revival. Earlier nineteenth century styles, such as Federal, Neoclassical, and Italianate, featured relatively unadorned surfaces accented by columns, cornices, and pediments in regular and symmetrical patterns to achieve an architectural balance that was associated with ancient Greece and Rome in addition to more recent English and American precedents. Later nineteenth century styles, such as the Second Empire and Romanesque Revival, featured more exterior ornamentation in the form of turrets, mansard roofs, and cupolas with clock and bell towers to project a more sophisticated appearance associated with the impartial administration of justice. Frequent use of multiple hallways, towers, multiple levels, and redundancies in circulation pathways in these courthouses often resulted in a lower net usable square footage in proportion to other designs which could perform the same public and governmental functions within a smaller overall exterior envelope. However, the added expense to the county taxpayer could often be justified by additional potential uses for these towers and cupolas, such as clock towers that could double as execution chambers for non-public hangings and jury deliberation room towers that could serve as dormitories for use by sequestered juries in place of rental of private hotel facilities, as well as by the civic pride the residents of a county could have in a courthouse that was larger and more ornamented than those used by neighboring counties.

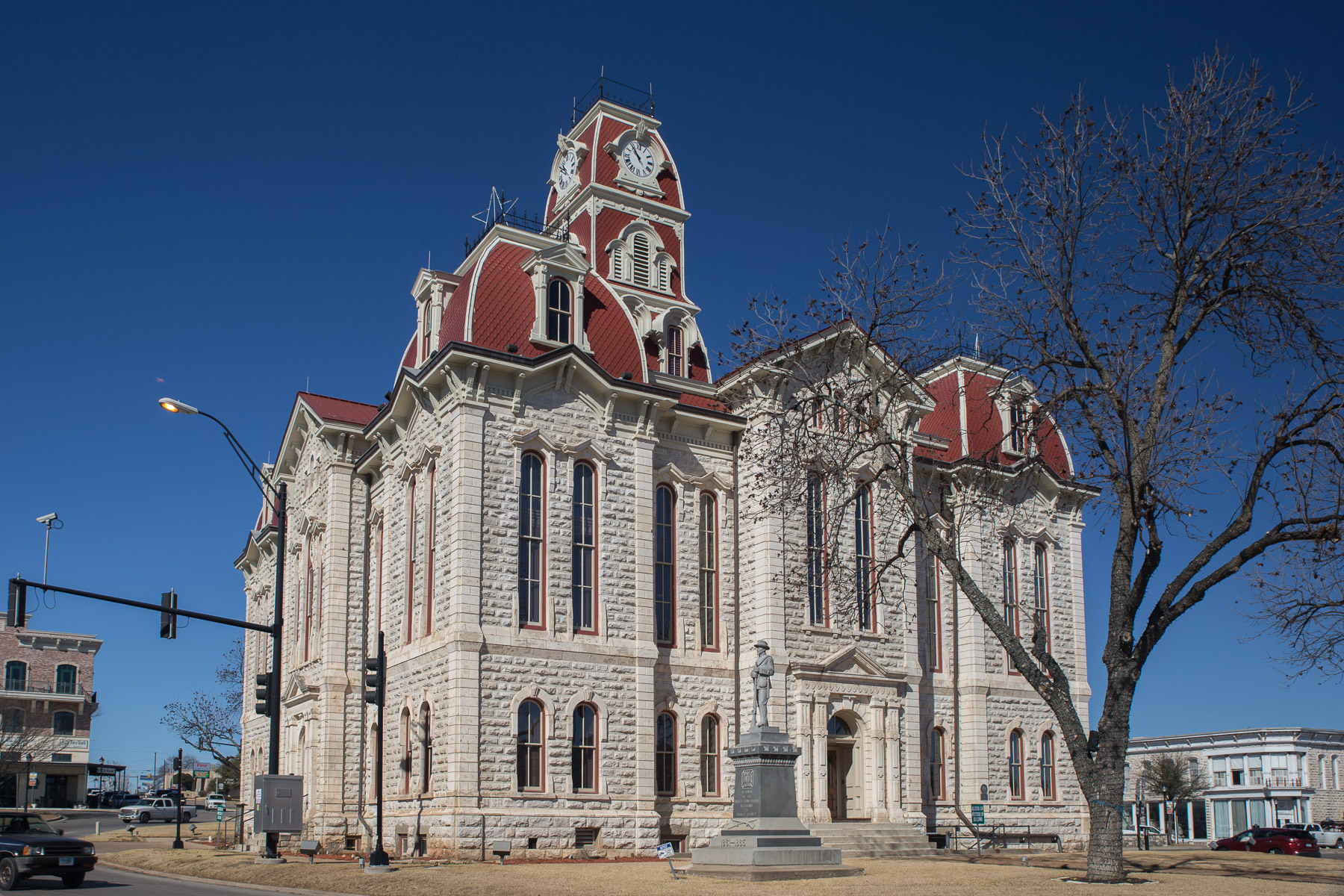
Parker County Courthouse, Weatherford, Texas

== County jails and sheriff's residences ==
Similar to the architectural features used by county courthouses in the nineteenth century, county jails of the period also demonstrated a preference for two story jails over earlier one story examples in all but the smallest of rural counties. As there were little to no requirements to make courthouses or jails accessible to the disabled, no minimum standards of staffing levels existed for jails based on their design and usage, and improved sanitation and climate control didn't become common until the twentieth century, the expense of erecting a jail with two cells on each of two levels was little more than that of building a jail with four cells on one level, and there could be additional benefits to a multi level design, such as less land area occupied if property values or population density was high in a downtown setting, separation of general male prisoners from females or those with special needs, as well as a reduction in the risk of escape or unauthorized access by the public to jail cells located above the ground level, for example during a vigilante break in or race riot.

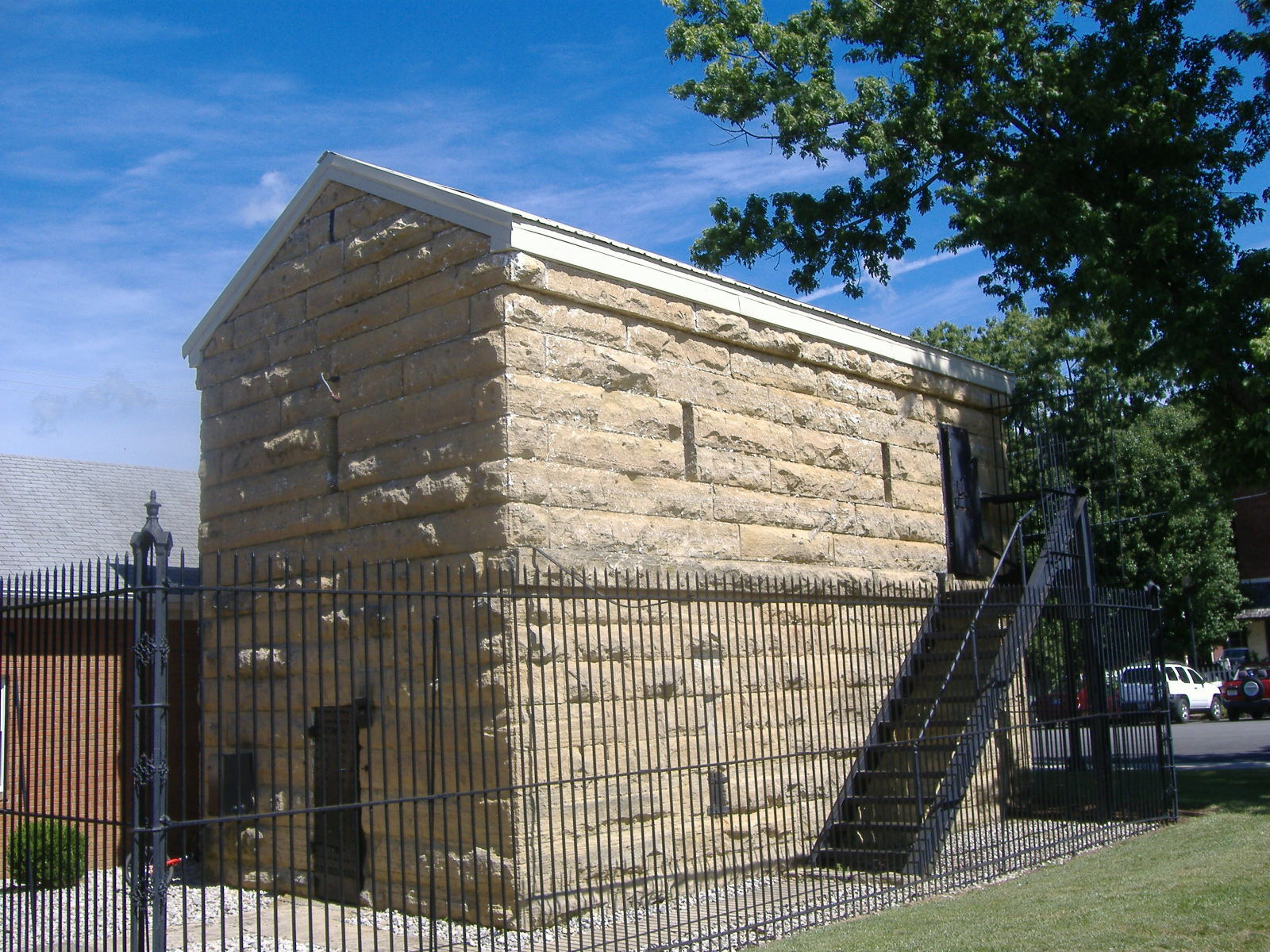
Old Trimble County Jail, Bedford, Kentucky

It was also typical for the sheriff's house to be attached to the county jail, allowing the house and the jail to share a kitchen and office facilities, as well as for the sheriff's family to help cook and care for the inmates. A dedicated sheriff's house also reduced the need for the sheriff to be paid an excessive income by the county administrators and ensured that the sheriff lived near the center of the county in case of an emergency during non business hours. In the eastern United States, it became common for the sheriff's house to occupy both levels of the front of the building and the jail to occupy both levels of the rear of the building, allowing the front of the building to look and feel more like a family home than a place of deprivation of liberty. In the western states, where the risk of escape, riot, or vigilante action was elevated, it became common for the sheriff's apartment and office to use the entirety of the ground floor to allow all of the jail cells to be located on the upper levels, which were considered more secure. While rusticated stone and ashlar lintels sourced from locally available rocks were commonly used for the construction of smaller one and two story nineteenth century county jails, it was also common for sheriff's houses and larger county jails to match the architectural design and features of their respective county courthouses.

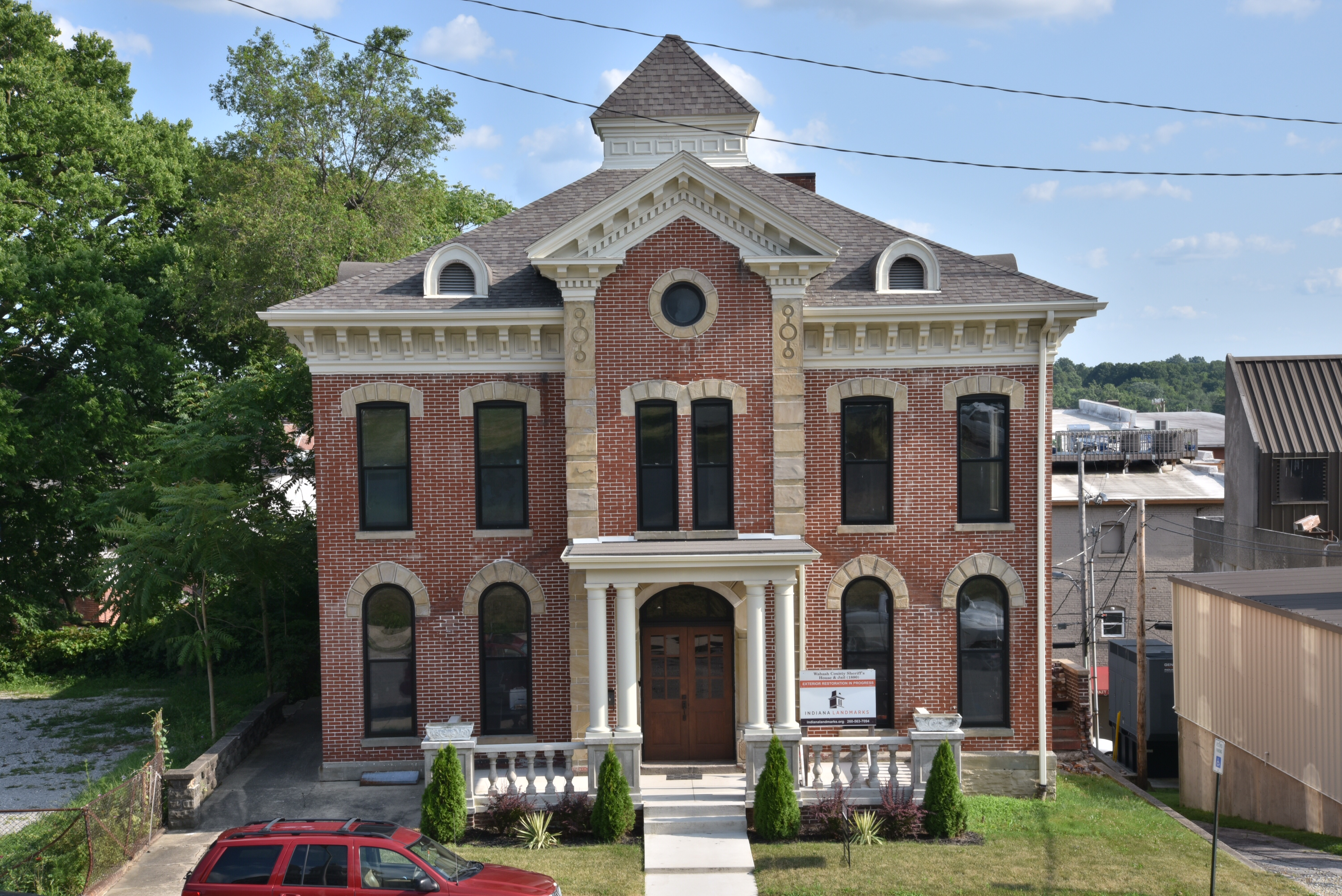
Old Wabash County Sheriff's House and Jail, Wabash, Indiana
