= Bruin's Slave Jail =

Historic site in Virginia, US

- U.S. National Register of Historic Places
- Virginia Landmarks Register
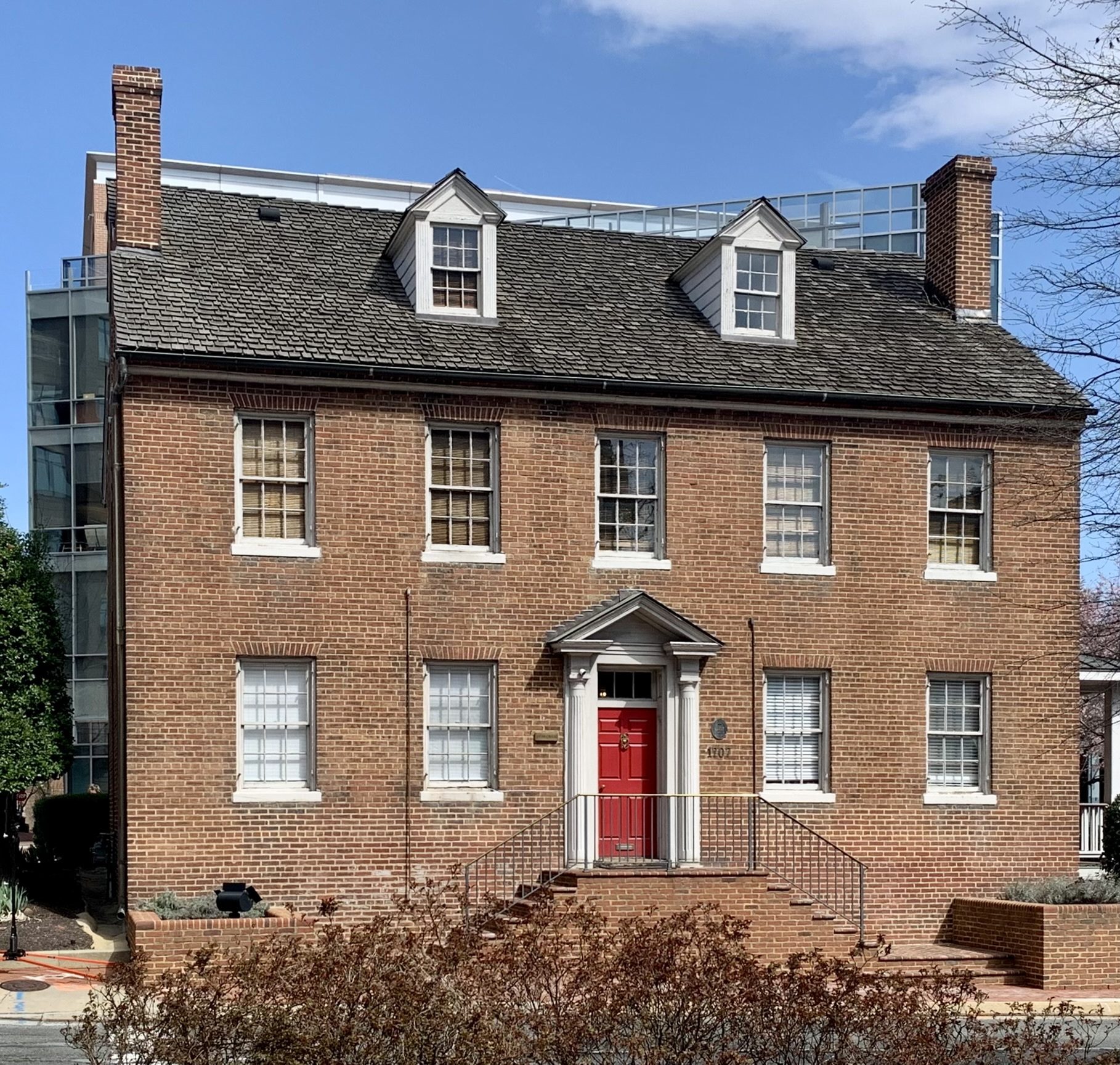
- Bruin's Slave Jail in 2022

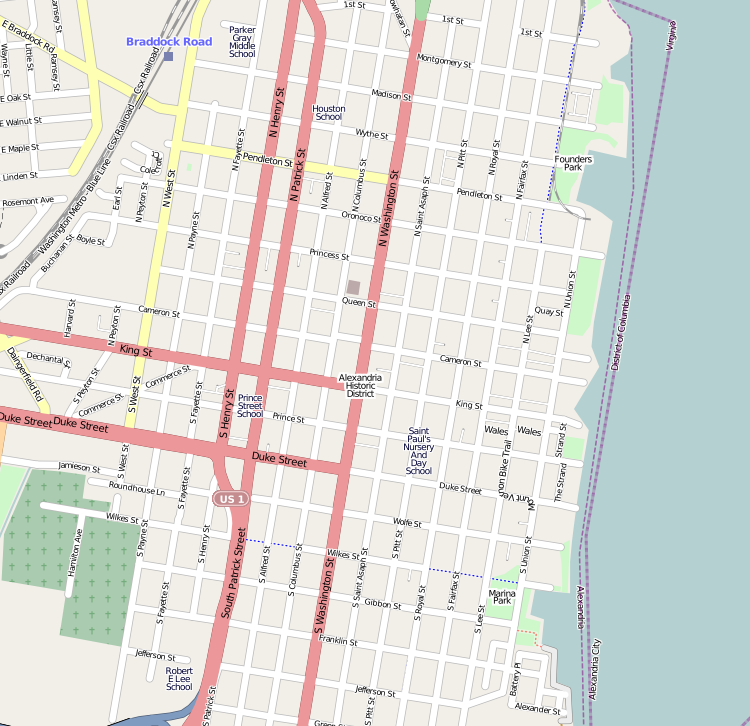
- Location within Alexandria Historical District Location within Virginia Location within the United States
- Location: 1707 Duke St., Alexandria, Virginia
- Coordinates: 38°48′15″N 77°3′32″W
- Area: less than one acre
- Built: 1819
- Architectural style: Federal
- NRHP reference No.: 00000890
- VLR No.: 100-0047

Significant dates
- Added to NRHP: August 14, 2000
- Designated VLR: December 1, 1999

Bruin's Slave Jail is a two-story brick building in Alexandria, Virginia, in which slave trader Joseph Bruin imprisoned slaves. Bruin's company, called Bruin and Hill, transported enslaved Americans of African descent to slave markets in the Southern United States. At the start of the American Civil War, Bruin was captured and imprisoned in Washington, D.C. His property, including the slave jail, was confiscated by U.S. Marshals and used as the Fairfax County Courthouse until 1865. All that remains today of the entire compound is a two-story brick structure that housed the enslaved people. Bruin's home, kitchen, and wash-house no longer remain.

== See also ==
- Slave markets and slave jails in the United States
