= Slave Auction Block, Fredericksburg =

Stone for slave auctions in Virginia, US

Coordinates: 38.30293°N 77.46178°W

Slave Auction Block
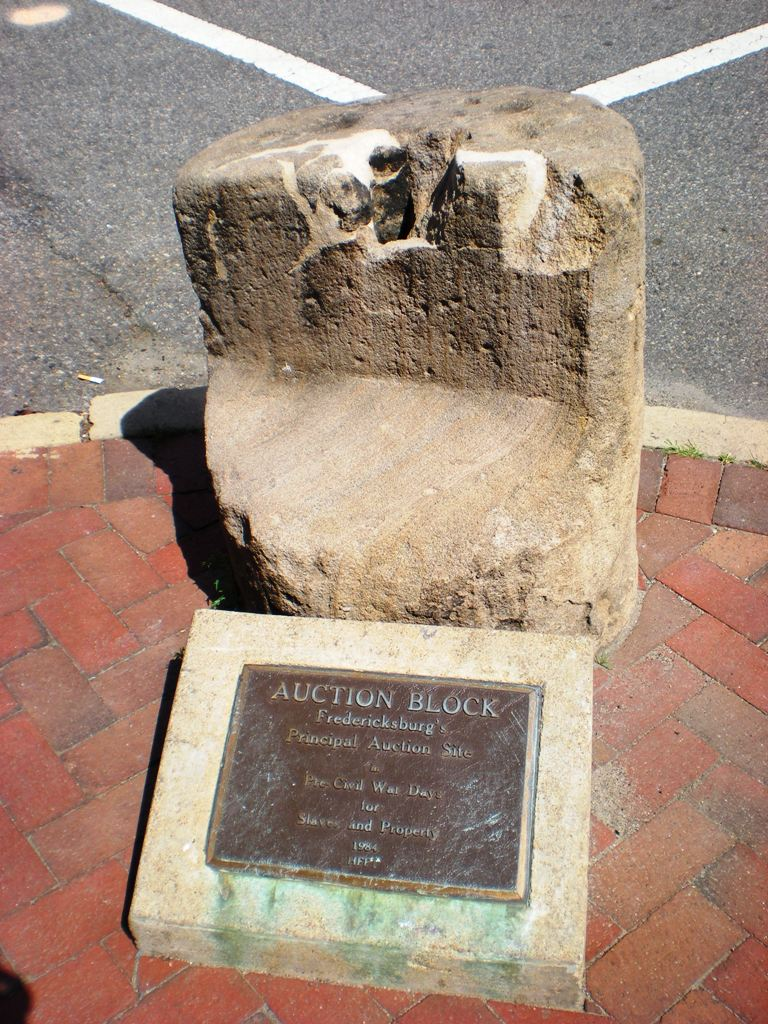
- Slave Auction Block, Fredericksburg, Virginia
- Location: Fredericksburg, Virginia
- Dismantled date: June 5, 2020

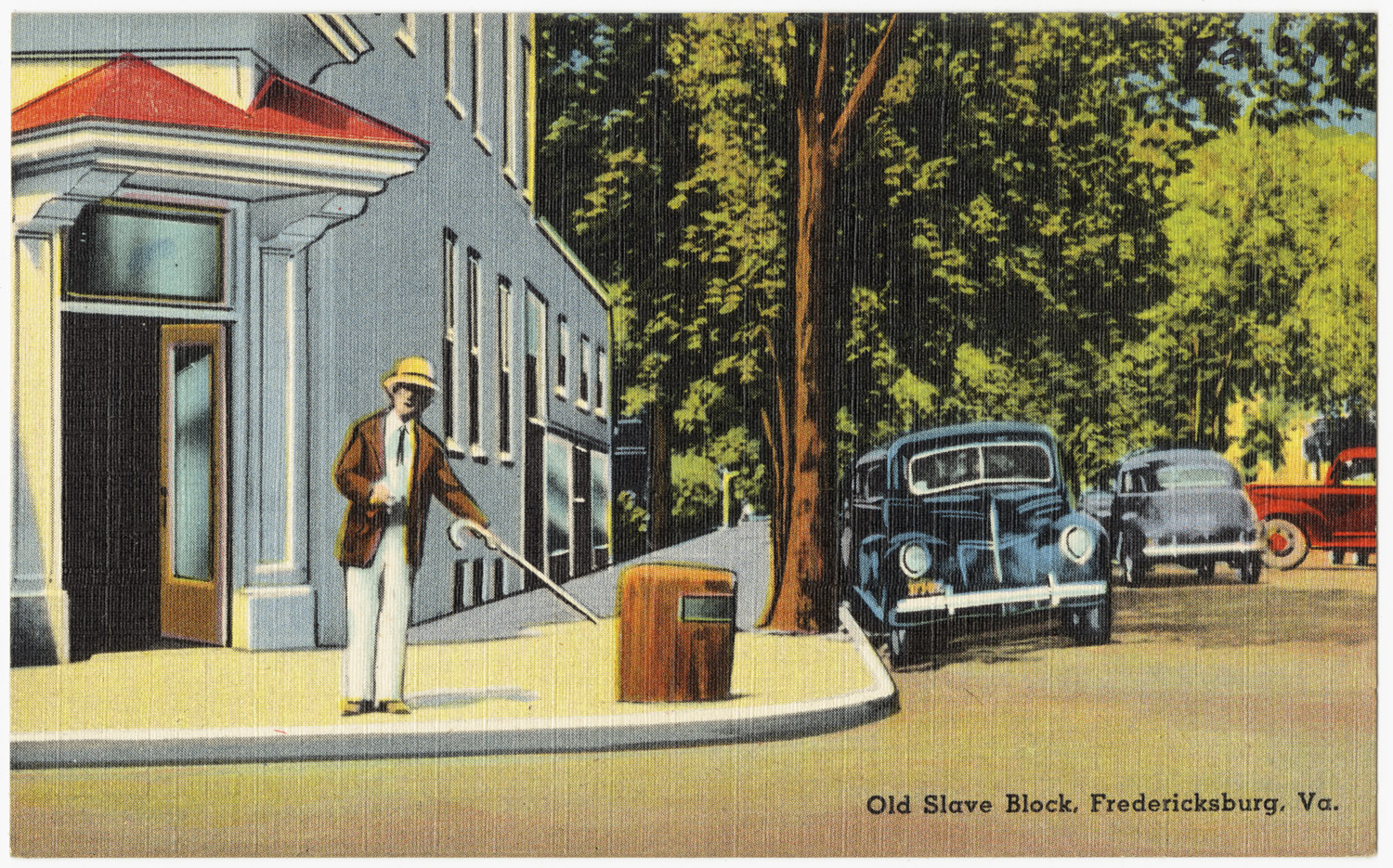
Tichnor Brothers linen-era postcard

The Slave Auction Block in Fredericksburg, Virginia is a large stone that was used as an auction block in slave auctions. It was located on the corner of William Street and Charles Street, and is listed on the National Register of Historic Places as part of the Fredericksburg Historic District.

After almost a century of debate as to whether or not it should be removed as a symbol of racial oppression, it was voted by City Council to be removed on June 11, 2019, one year before the protests triggered by the murder of George Floyd. The city council had been planning the block's removal since 2017, with a court victory by the council in February 2020 having cleared the last remaining legal obstacles to moving it. The auction block was removed from its site on June 5, 2020, and is displayed at the Fredericksburg Area Museum.

== See also ==
- List of monuments and memorials removed during the George Floyd protests
- Slave markets and slave jails in the United States
