= Jacques Nicolas Bussière de Pouilly =

Franco-American architect

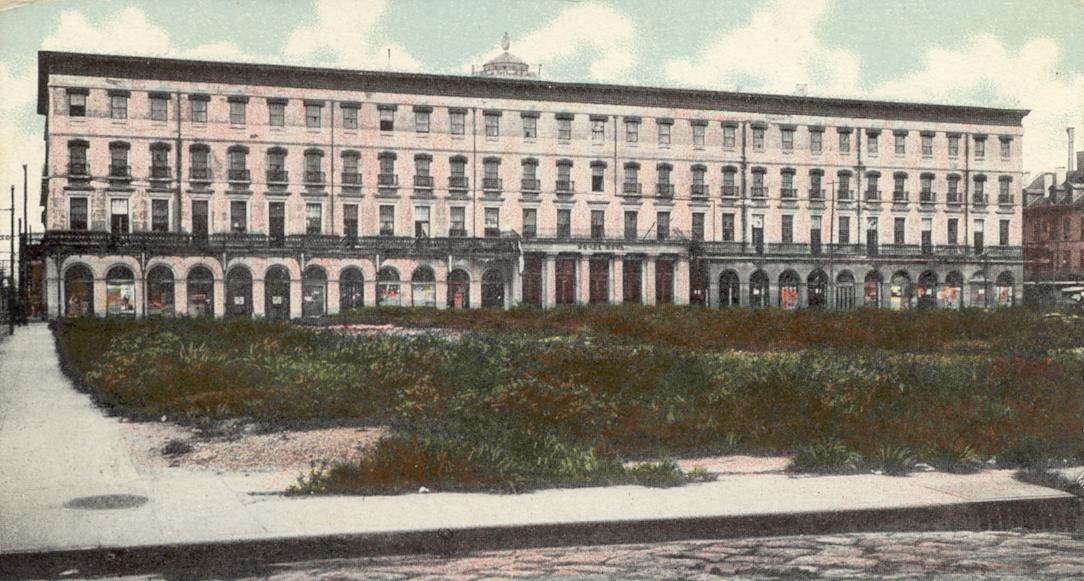
- The St. Louis Hotel in New Orleans, designed by J.N.B. de Pouilly, shortly before demolition in 1915
- Born: July 7, 1804; Châtel-Censoir, Yonne, France
- Died: February 21, 1875 (aged 70); New Orleans, Louisiana, U.S.
- Occupation: Architect
- Spouse: Laurence (Drigny) de Pouilly
- Children: Lucienne de Pouilly
- Buildings: St. Louis Cathedral; St. Louis (City Exchange) Hotel; Orléans Theatre; St. Augustine Church

Jacques Nicolas Bussière (often simply J.N.B.) de Pouilly (Châtel-Censoir, Yonne, France, 7 July 1804 – 21 February 1875, New Orleans, Louisiana, USA), was a Franco-American architect. He was one of the most important architects in New Orleans during the nineteenth century, particularly known for his work for the Francophone population of the city, as well as the current St. Louis Cathedral on Jackson Square, and his designs for funereal architecture in the city's cemeteries.

== Early life ==
De Pouilly was born in Châtel-Censoir, a small village in the western part of Burgundy, northwest of Dijon and south of Auxerre (préfecture of the newly created Département of Yonne). His birth in July 1804 occurred at a critical juncture in French history, during the waning months of the Consulate, just before Napoléon was to crown himself French Emperor. He had four siblings, including a brother, Joseph Isidore, likely born in 1809, with whom he would later practice architecture in New Orleans.

Virtually nothing is known of his education and particularly his architectural training. Ann Masson, the architectural historian to have worked most extensively on de Pouilly, speculates that he may have attended a regional Ecole des Beaux-Arts in either Besançon, Troyes, or Lyon. Despite de Pouilly's clear knowledge of the trends of French architecture and the development of the eclectic style called the Néo-Grec among a new young generation of talented designers in the 1830s, no records at the national Ecole des Beaux-Arts in Paris betray that he ever matriculated there, nor has any other evidence surfaced to suggest that he studied in one of the ateliers (studios) officially or unofficially associated with the school.

== Move to New Orleans and early success ==
Likely immersed in the field of architecture by the mid-1820s, early sources indicate that he married Mlle. Laurence Drigny, the daughter of a French architect, at the Eglise St-Roch on the rue Faubourg St-Honoré in Paris on 1 October 1825, and that their daughter Lucienne was born in Paris on 6 January 1833. By December that year de Pouilly had immigrated with his family to New Orleans, and he was listed in an 1834 city directory as an architect with an office at 78 St. Philip Street, in the Vieux Carré, or French Quarter.

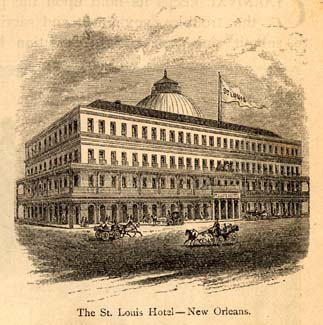
St. Louis Hotel, New Orleans, 1875 engraving by James Wells Champney.

De Pouilly's first notable work in the United States was the new City Exchange (later St. Louis) Hotel (1835) in the Vieux Carré, finished in 1838, the Francophone community's answer to the Anglophones’ St. Charles Hotel on the other (southwestern) side of Canal Street in the “American Quarter.” His reputation as a trained architect seems to have preceded him in garnering the commission, and he completed it with the aid of his brother Joseph, who had arrived in New Orleans by this point. The hotel's arcaded ground floor, reserved for individual retailers, recalled the shopping district of the rue de Rivoli in central Paris by Charles Percier and Pierre Fontaine dating from 1811. Described soon after its completion as a "magnificent edifice which is one of the greatest ornaments of the city," it contained a large lobby (or vestibule) that measured 40 feet (12 m) by 127 feet (39 m), a grand ballroom, and public parlors. It was destroyed by fire in 1841, then rebuilt with fireproof materials using a $600,000 loan from the Citizens Bank, whose new building de Pouilly had also designed in 1836. In 1837–38 de Pouilly also designed buildings for the adjacent Passage de la Bourse. The original City Exchange Hotel was host to a wide range of important people within the South. During the pre-Civil War period, the hotel was host to a large number of balls and meetings, the most well-known being the bal travesti, where Henry Clay gave his only speech in Louisiana, in February 1843.

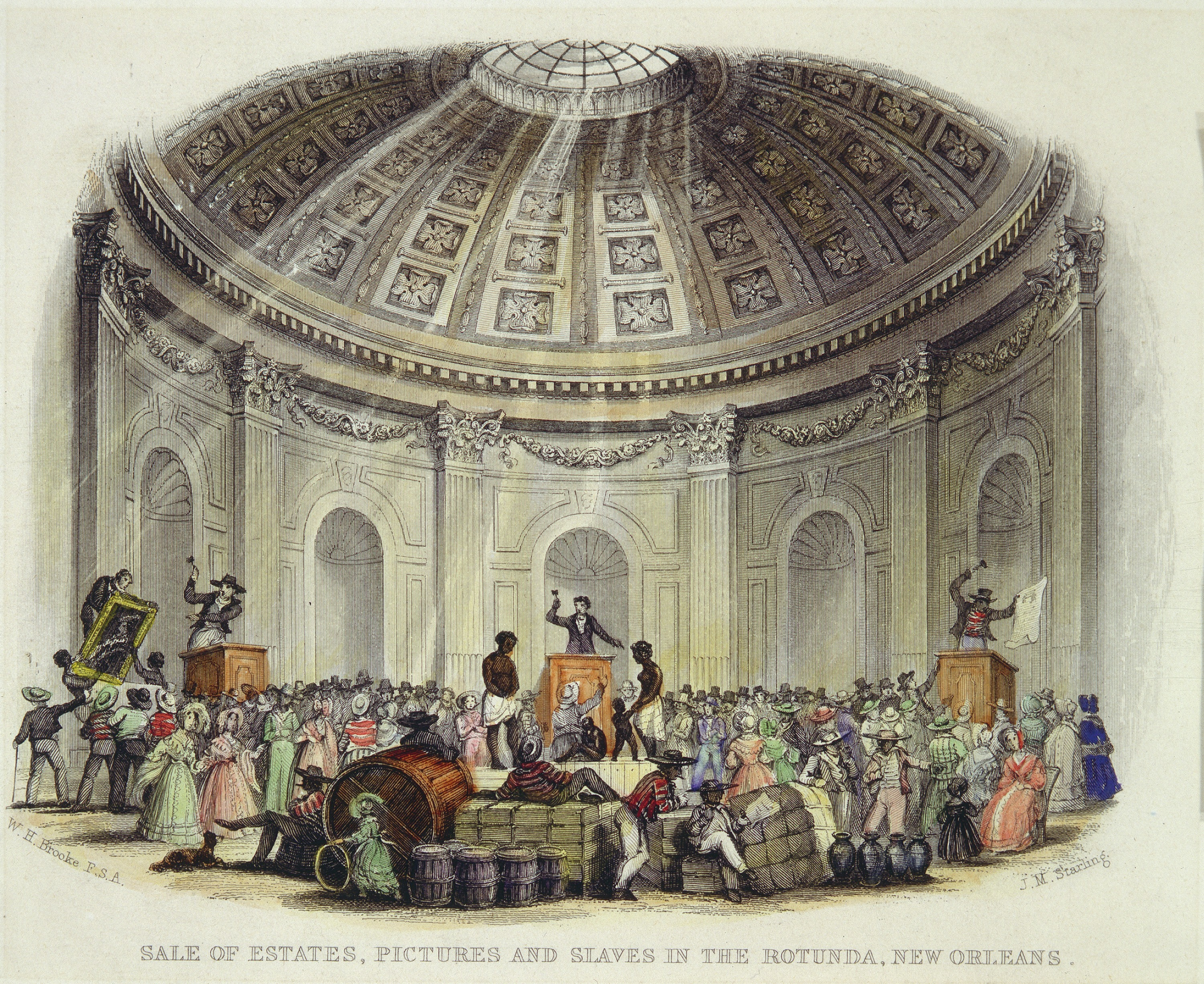
A fictionalized artist's imagining of "Sale of Estates, Pictures and Slaves in the Rotunda at New Orleans," by J. M. Starling (engraver), from William Henry Brooke (illustrator), in The Slave States of America (1842) by James Silk Buckingham, that depicts a British artist's rendition of an auction being held in the St. Louis Hotel's rotunda. Shown is interior of a dome that looks more like the Pantheon in Rome than the St. Louis Hotel, with an auction block, slaves, goods and materials.

The St. Louis Hotel's defining feature, however, was its vast rotunda, "open from noon to three o'clock for business only," where, in the periods when New Orleans served as the Louisiana state capital, the state legislature occasionally met in session. However, it became best-known (and infamous today) as one of the central meccas for slave-dealing, which was ubiquitous in New Orleans, a major distribution point for slaves sent to the states of the Deep South, particularly the Mississippi Valley, brought there by sea from Upper South departure points, such as Baltimore, Richmond, and Washington. An auction block was installed in the rotunda, covered with a dome composed of a honeycomb of clay pots, and famously illustrated (somewhat inaccurately) in British visitor James Silk Buckingham’s The Slave States of America (1842), with an extensive accompanying textual description of such a scene.

The hotel served as a military hospital for Union soldiers during the Civil War occupation of New Orleans beginning in April 1862; during the Reconstruction era (1865–77), it was sold to the state of Louisiana, where it became the de facto state capitol building during New Orleans’ last stint as the state capital. It was there that the Republican Stephen B. Packard relinquished the governor's office after the Compromise of 1877 that March, when newly elected U.S. president Rutherford B. Hayes withdrew military forces from the South, thus ending Reconstruction and allowing white-supremacist Democratic regimes to return to control of Southern statewide and local offices for the next 85 years. The hotel deteriorated as it shuttled between a series of owners until it was finally destroyed in the hurricane of September 1915. The Omni Royal Orleans, built in 1969 and unconnected with the St. Louis Hotel, now stands on its site.

De Pouilly's reputation after the 1841 fire at the St. Louis Hotel appears to have been affected very little, as he continued to garner numerous commissions in the city center. Other works in the 1830s and 1840s included townhouses for prominent French-speaking Creole citizens, including a home and pharmacy for Louis Dufilho on Chartres Street in 1837 (now the New Orleans Pharmacy Museum), and the Olivier family's residence at 828 Toulouse Street in 1839. In 1842 he and his contractor partner Ernest Goudchaux received commissions for St. Augustine Church in what is now Tremé, one of the most prominent African-American Catholic parishes in New Orleans; the residence for a Mme. Avert; and Edouard Bertus, a fencing master; as well as the St. Charles (or Camp Street or American) Theatre in the American Quarter on Poydras Street.

== Funerary architecture ==
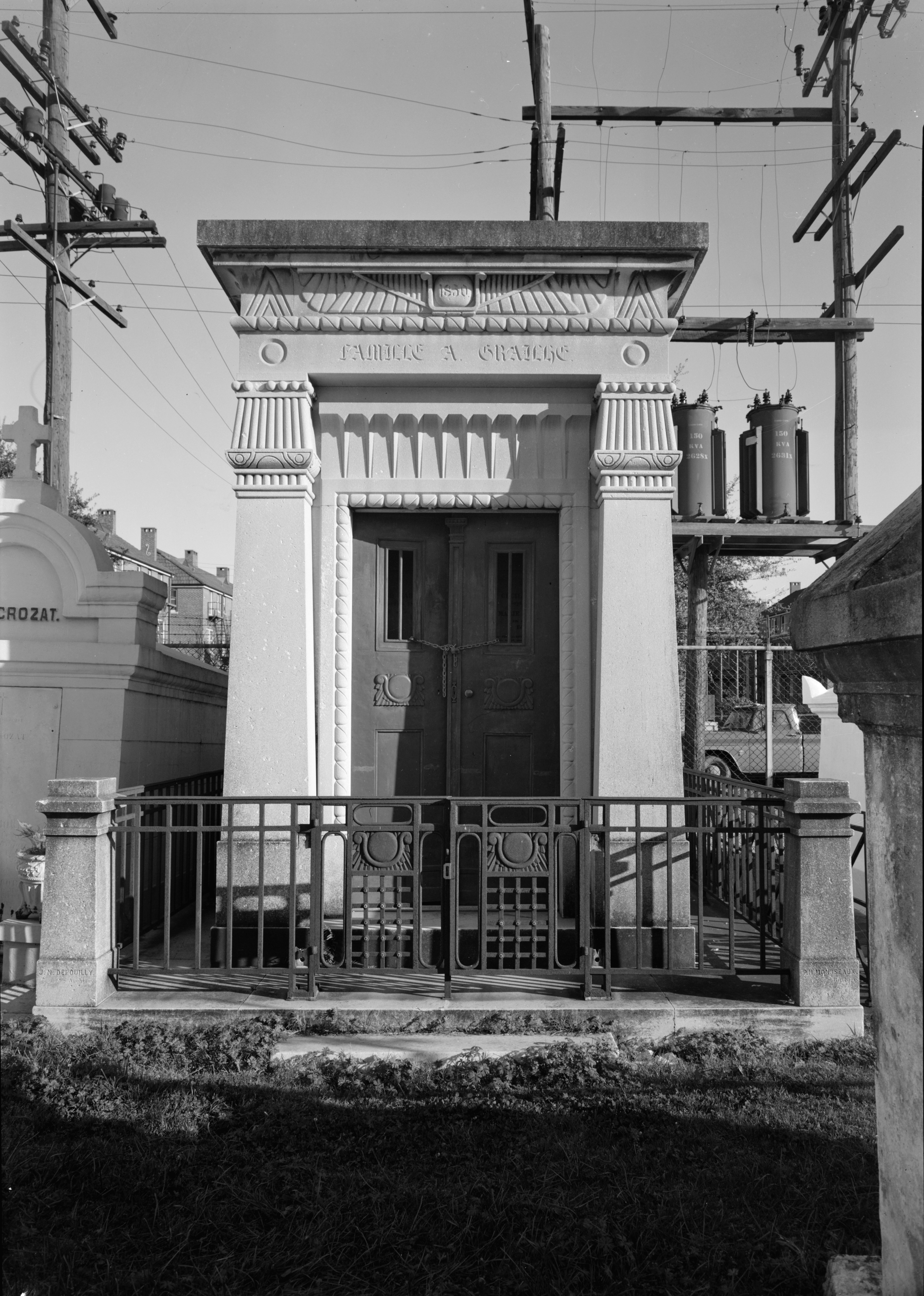
Grailhe Family Tomb, as seen in 1965

New Orleans' official topographical elevation is five feet below sea level, and the high water table below the ground surface means that the soil is unsuitable for underground burials. This has presented a problem for the city but also an opportunity for funerary architecture, as the city's residents have as a result preferred above-ground entombments. De Pouilly became intimately involved with the development of this type at the same time he was designing other buildings for living inhabitants, partly due to his partnership with Goudchaux and partly from his own acquisition of an interest in a granite and marble yard near the St. Louis Cemeteries, established in 1789 not far to the northwest of the inland boundaries of the Vieux Carré, eight city blocks from the banks of the Mississippi. Considered at the time a suburban location (as the city limits stretched no farther than the limits of simply today's French Quarter), in the subsequent years they have become surrounded by various residential and commercial districts.

De Pouilly's contacts within the Francophone community in New Orleans provided him ample opportunities to experiment with funerary monuments as early as 1836. One significant cemetery project came when local merchant Alexandre Grailhe commissioned de Pouilly to design an elaborate Egyptian revival family tomb in St. Louis Cemetery No. 2. Construction of this tomb commenced in 1850. A series of other cemetery projects followed for de Pouilly, mostly at the St. Louis Cemetery No. 2 and mostly for local people of considerable financial means. His designs were heavily influenced by the architecture found in the Parisian cemetery Père Lachaise, coincidentally itself founded the year de Pouilly was born (1804), which at the time was also well outside the medieval walls of Paris before the expansion of the city in the 1850s and 1860s under Napoléon III. De Pouilly must have known Père Lachaise intimately, as several tomb designs of his actually replicate tombs in the Parisian necropolis.

De Pouilly's prolific tomb commissions came from both wealthy New Orleans families and the city's numerous benevolent organizations. The first above-ground tombs at St. Louis Cemetery No. 1 were erected by 1804 and were common by 1818. The movement toward above-ground tombs was hastened by the elevation of the regular parish Church of St. Louis to cathedral status in 1794 with the creation of the new Diocese of New Orleans. As a consequence, burial of members of the clergy or other privileged people of the community could no longer take place within the church, and so they and their families sought the prestige of an above-ground tomb at St. Louis Cemetery, in concert with the economic prosperity that New Orleans enjoyed as the foremost U.S. port around the Gulf of Mexico. For these reasons, tombs at St. Louis Cemetery came to be considered status symbols in the community.

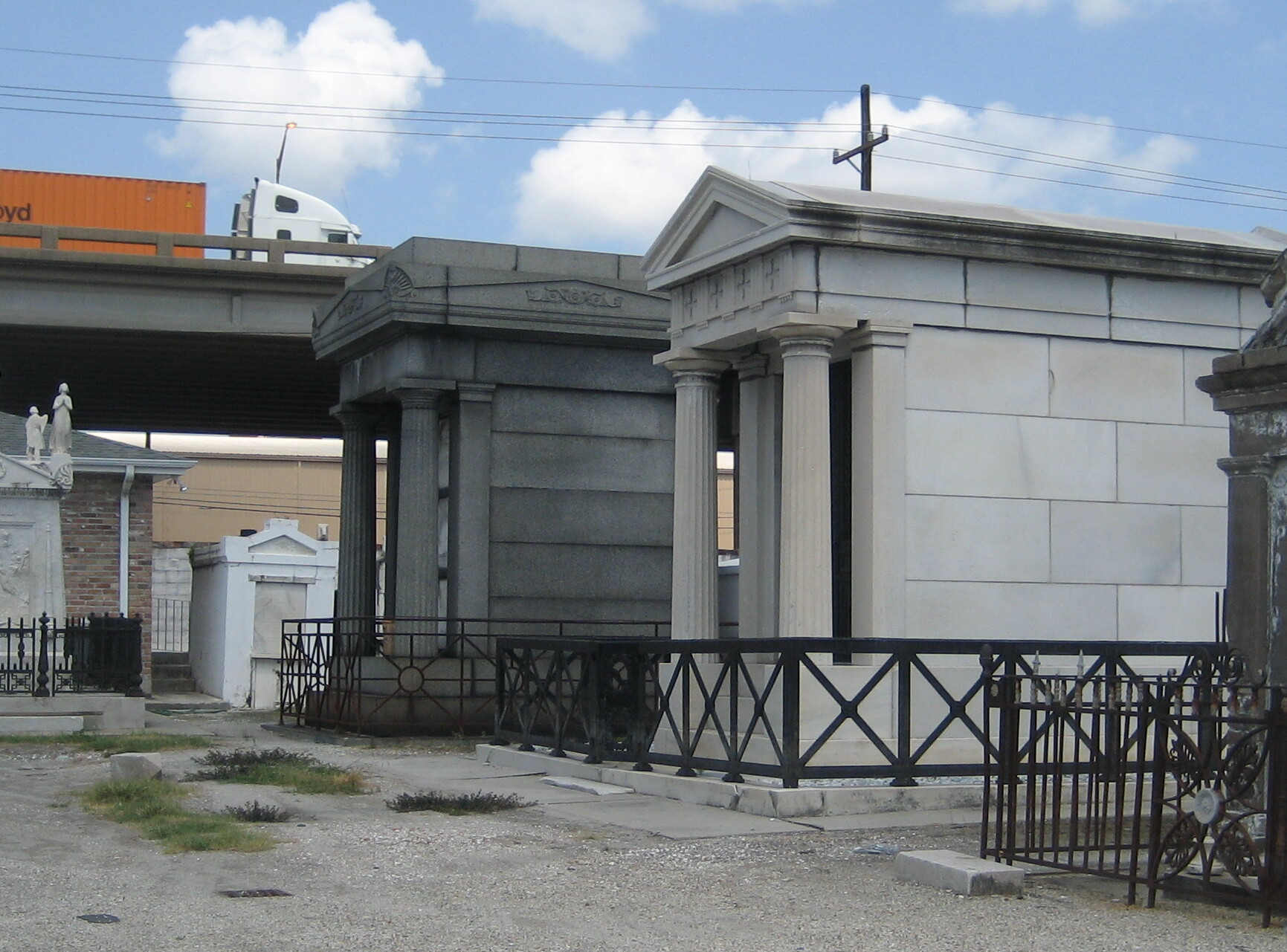
Miltenberger Family Tomb (left) and Peniston and Duplantier Families Mausoleum, St. Louis Cemetery No. 2, both Greek revival designs by de Pouilly.

To achieve designs suitable for his clients, de Pouilly made use of carved marble and granite, molded plaster, and cast-iron railings, all in styles that often carried historic significance or symbolism. His designs for tombs, essentially decorated cubical or prismatic vaults, drew also on the works of Jean-Nicolas-Louis Durand published between 1799 and 1810. They frequently consist of a prostyle pedimented front resting on two columns, not unlike a modest Greek or Roman temple. The various stripes of classicism, such as Greek Revival and a severe eighteenth-century Neoclassicism popularized by the paper architecture of Etienne-Louis Boullée or Claude-Nicolas Ledoux, were regular components of his repertoire, but de Pouilly also adapted to the Néo-Grec eclecticism of his French contemporaries like Henri Labrouste and Félix Duban; he also turned to Gothic, favored by Eugène-Emmanuel Viollet-le-Duc and others after 1840. Like most nineteenth-century architects, many of de Pouilly's tomb designs are evident in his sketchbooks, at least one of which currently resides in the Historic New Orleans Collection. De Pouilly also frequently worked in concert with Florville Foy, a free man of color in New Orleans who contemporaneously built a successful business as a marble cutter and sculptor for funerary monuments.

== St. Louis Cathedral and career difficulties ==
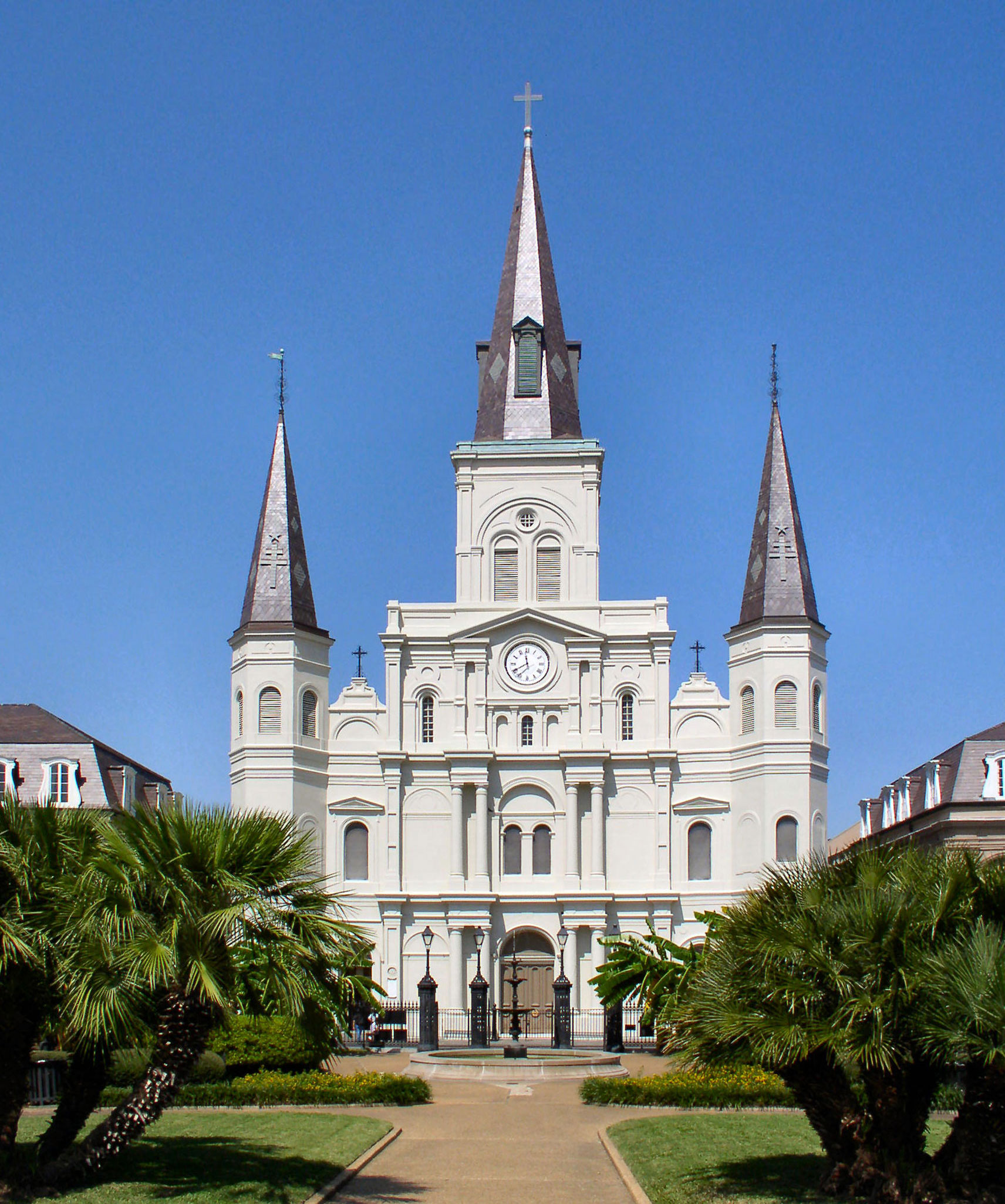
St. Louis Cathedral on Jackson Square today, as constructed essentially to designs of de Pouilly.

By the end of the 1840s, de Pouilly stood at the peak of his career. The singular extant commission for which he remains best known is the remodeling of St. Louis Cathedral, whose design he produced, though he did not see the job through to its completion. The cathedral, which had been founded as a parish church as soon as the French settled New Orleans in 1718 and then elevated to a diocesan seat, had gone through numerous reconstructions and enlargements as the population of the city grew; it was also damaged in several fires that struck New Orleans over the subsequent years, such as those of 1788 and 1794. After Benjamin Henry Latrobe moved to New Orleans, he added a central tower with a clock and bell in 1819; the latter was embossed with the French legend "Victoire" in commemoration of the American victory over British forces in the Battle of New Orleans in January 1815.

Enlarging St. Louis Cathedral to meet the needs of the growing congregation had been pondered since 1834, and de Pouilly was consulted to design plans for a new building. On 12 March 1849, the diocese contracted with John Patrick Kirwan to enlarge and restore the cathedral, using De Pouilly's plans. These specified that everything be demolished except the lateral walls and the lower portions of the existing towers on the front facade, but during the reconstruction, it became necessary to also demolish the lateral walls. As a result, very little of the Spanish Colonial structure survives today. During the renovation, St. Patrick's Church served as the pro-cathedral for the city.

De Pouilly ultimately produced at least four schemes reminiscent of the eclecticism of the Néo-Grec that subtly combined Gothic Revival and the white austerity of Spanish Renaissance classicism. The drawing adopted in 1849 shows the existing building largely as it was built, but with the visually startling feature of a dramatic, pierced-work, cast-iron steeple encircled by balconies, clearly cognizant of the new advocacy of iron as a decorative and structural complement to the properties of Gothic vaulting as advocated simultaneously by Viollet-le-Duc. Though obviously not built precisely as such (the central spire is opaquely covered in shingles), de Pouilly's Romantic composition that combines stacked temple fronts, Romanesque arches, paired columns, blind niches, and pilasters remains the defining image of Jackson Square, and to a great extent, the city of New Orleans itself.

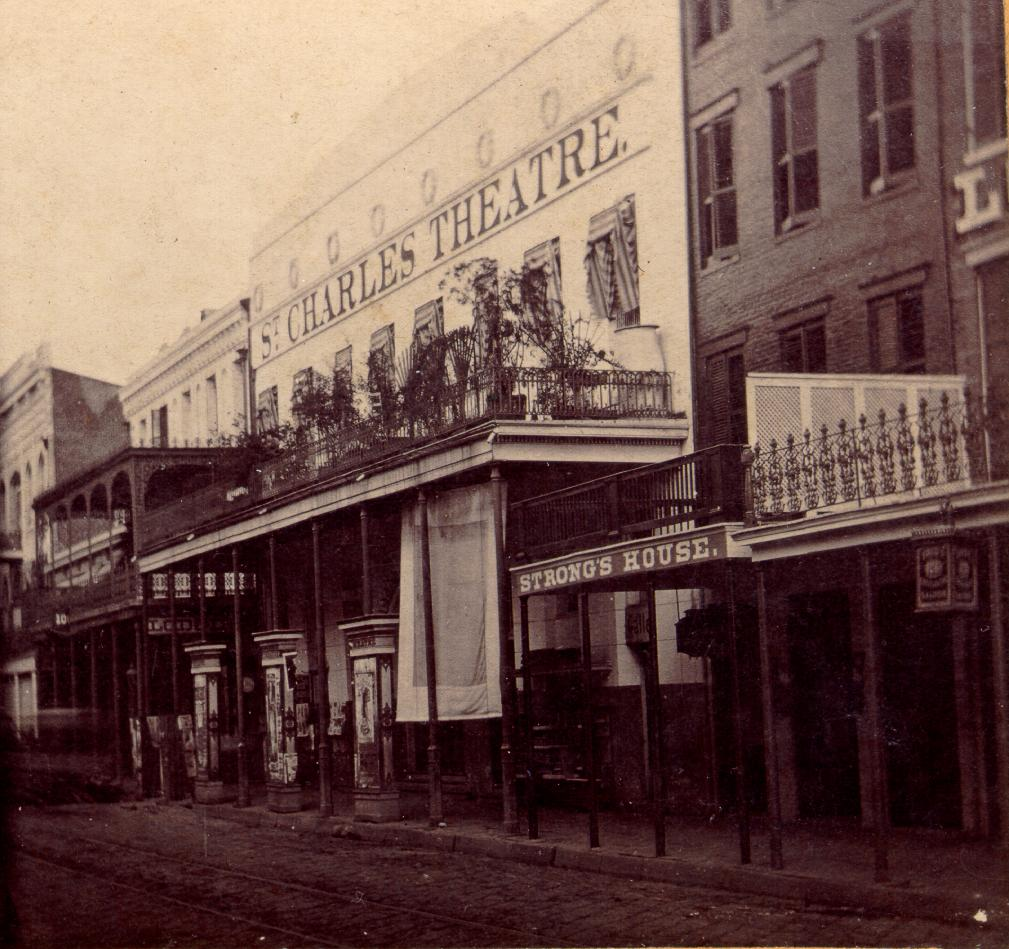
St. Charles (also known as Camp Street or American) Theater, New Orleans, designed by de Pouilly in 1842-43, burned in 1899. From a stereocard by S.T. Blessing, ca. 1890.

During construction in 1850, the central tower collapsed, and while a subsequent investigation determined that Kirwan, as contractor, was at fault for not allowing the mortar of the masonry construction to be properly set and cured before continuing the work, both he and de Pouilly were replaced. The cathedral tower's collapse by itself, while damaging to de Pouilly, was likely not serious enough to completely mar his reputation. On 28 February 1854, his career would suffer another blow when the interior balconies of the Théâtre d'Orléans, the city's most important opera house, which de Pouilly had remodeled nine years earlier in 1845, also collapsed, killing several patrons and injuring at least 40 others. The morning afterwards, a committee of architects and builders, which included the well-known architect Henry Howard, city surveyor Louis H. Pilié (the designer of Jackson Square, who would later become de Pouilly's partner), and builder Thomas Murray was assembled to investigate the matter. They eventually placed blame for the structural failure of the suspended boxes on the contractors for the ironwork, the Pelanne brothers, and de Pouilly as the supervising architect. Gallier, Turpin & Co. were engaged to make repairs by supporting the balconies with iron columns driven into the building's foundations, and the venue reopened swiftly, on 11 March 1854.

However, de Pouilly's commissions largely dried up during the 1850s as a result. He turned to publishing, like many American architects of the period such as Andrew Jackson Downing, Samuel Sloan, and Alexander J. Davis, announcing in 1857 a new project called Home Illustrations, a monthly periodical chronicling the domestic designs in Louisiana, but it never transpired. He returned to his prolific business designing tombs for wealthy Francophone clients, while also teaching drawing at Audubon College, a boys' school superintended by his son-in-law Simon Rouen. During the 1860s he also lent his drawing skills to creating plans for legal documents.

== Later life and legacy ==
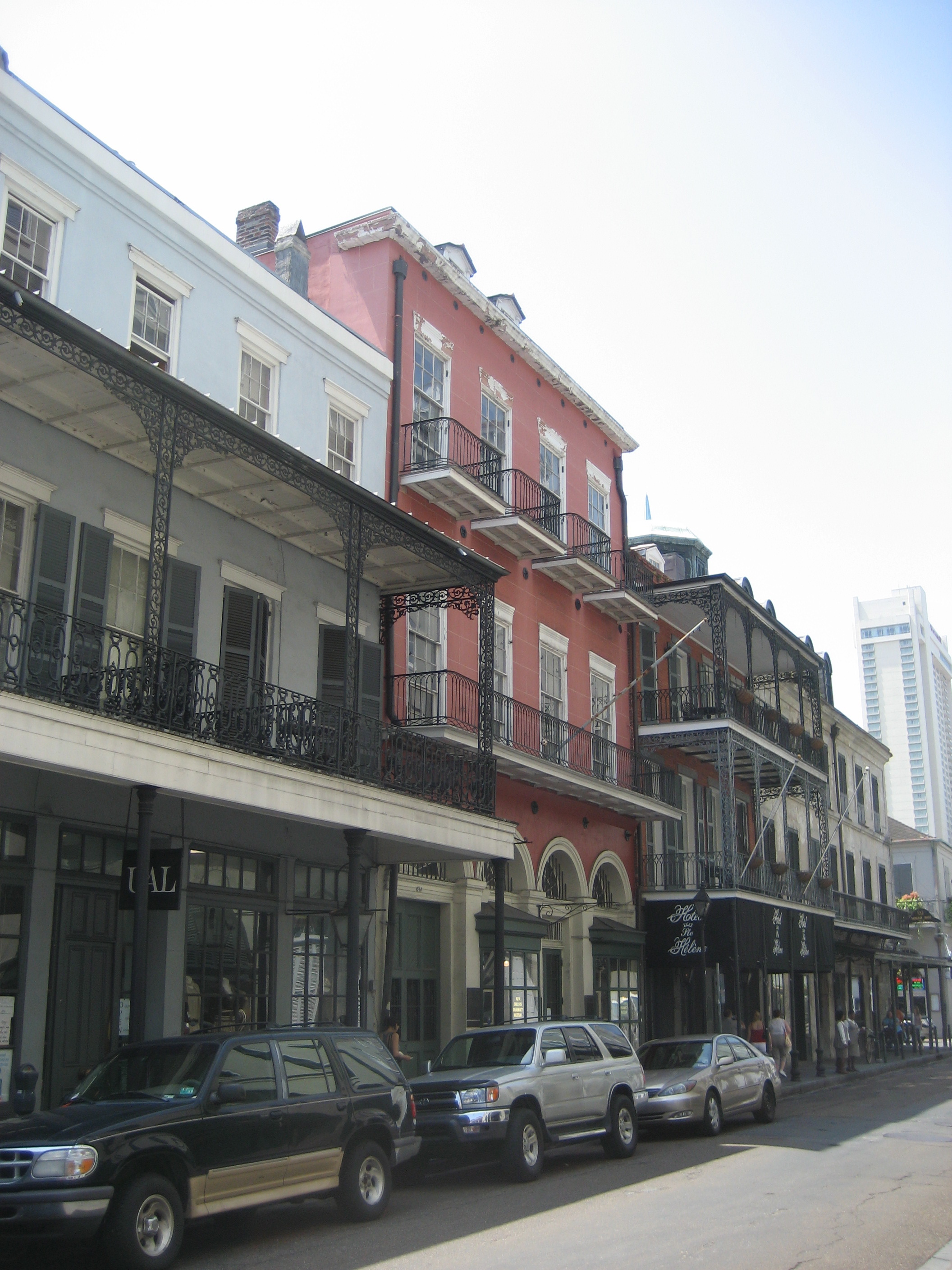
New Orleans Pharmacy Museum, originally designed as a townhouse and shop for Louis Dufilo, Jr., by de Pouilly in 1837.

The American Civil War brought building activity in New Orleans and virtually all of the South to a complete halt, and while the city was captured by Federal forces in the spring of 1862 and thereafter occupied, it was essentially spared from large-scale destruction. Afterwards, de Pouilly was able to resume practice, joining forces with Pilié to design, in 1867, New Orleans' Second District Asylum, later known as the Colored Waif's [sic] Home, where many years later Peter Davis (musician) would mentor Louis Armstrong in his early musical training, among many other talented black musicians. His last commission for St. Ann's Church on St. Philip Street in the French Quarter, completed in partnership with Eugene Surgi, dates from 1869.

De Pouilly also continued to receive commissions for funerary monuments up until his death in 1875, the same year as that of his near-contemporary Labrouste, who also completed relatively few major commissions during his lifetime. Much of our insight into de Pouilly's architectural career comes from his surviving sketchbooks, which cover his forty-year career in New Orleans. The last drawing in them is for a simple tomb that de Pouilly projected for himself and his family in 1874. He died on 21 February 1875 and is interred in a family vault in St. Louis Cemetery No. 2. If de Pouilly was not rewarded with lofty respect and a long list of high-profile commissions during his life, his obituary in the Daily Picayune the following day betrays a kinder sentiment among his fellow New Orleanians:

It is a name that will be treasured with fond recollections in the memories of a numerous host of friends and admirers of a man whose noble career should serve as an exemplar to future travelers through a world where principle too often yields the victory to the persuasions of temptation. The noble dead live forever; they leave behind a reputation to which time adds dignity unto dignity, rectitude unto rectitude. J.N. de Pouilly was born in France in the year 1805. On arriving at the age of manhood he adopted the honorable profession of architecture, and in 1833, at the age of twenty-eight, he came to this country and practiced his calling in this city.

Some of our most prominent buildings remain as trophies of his professional skill. He planned the cathedral, the St. Louis Hotel, the Citizen's Bank and the church of St. Augustin, besides many other structures of importance.

St. Peter's lofty dome cenotaphs the name of Michael Angelo [sic]: Sir Christopher Wren’s greatness is sepulchred in the mightiness of St. Paul's. Mr. De Pouilly fashioned no wonders such as these, but yet a greater, the enduring fabric of an honest life, and will be entombed in the constant remembrance of devoted friends.

Though clearly important to the development of New Orleans and the architectural profession in the United States, de Pouilly is undoubtedly not better known due to the few monumental commissions and important buildings he completed, in contrast to his prolific career designing tombs. Consequently, a comprehensive scholarly study of his work has yet to appear. He was, nonetheless, responsible for some of New Orleans' most iconic buildings, and he represents an important link between cutting-edge French architectural trends of the first half of the nineteenth century and the United States, long before American designers began to attend the Ecole des Beaux-Arts in large numbers after the American Civil War.

== Works ==
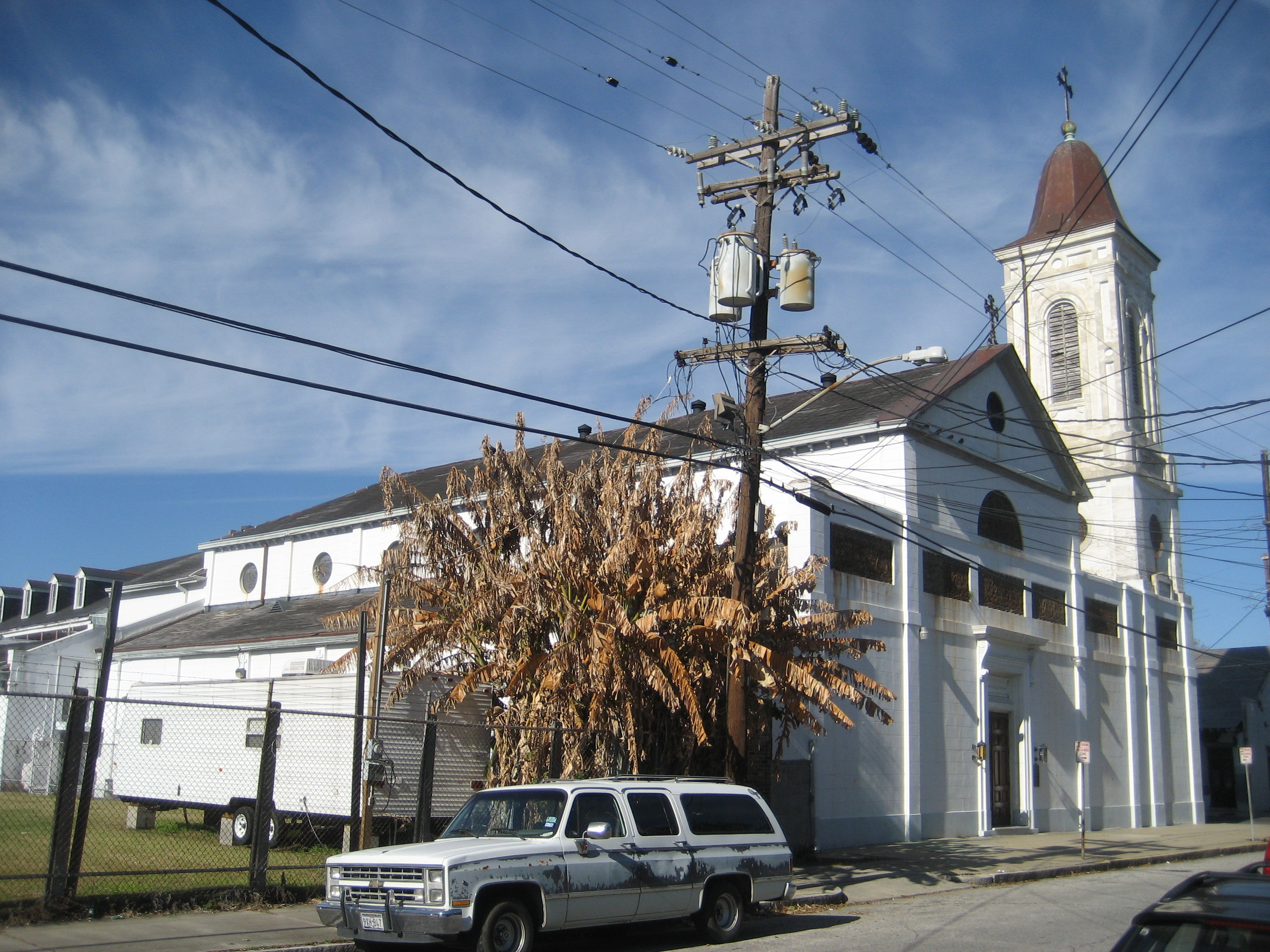
St. Augustine Church in Tremé was de Pouilly's first religious commission (1842).

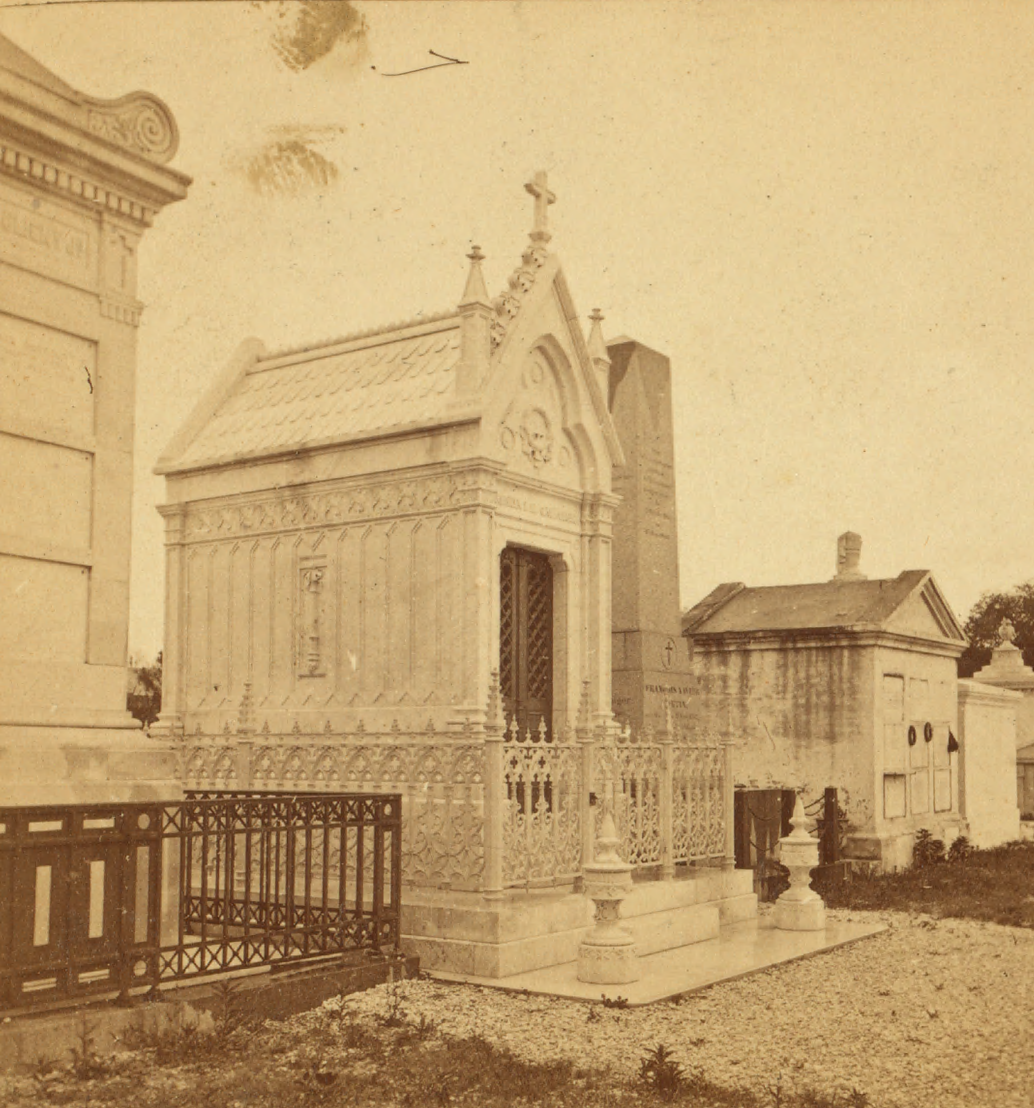
The Gothic-revival Caballero Tomb in St. Louis Cemetery #2, by de Pouilly, built in 1860.

Note: This is not a comprehensive list. All works in New Orleans unless otherwise noted.

- St. Louis (City Exchange) Hotel, St. Charles Avenue and Common Street (1835–38), demolished 1915
- Citizens Bank of Louisiana, Toulouse Street between Royal and Chartres Streets (1836–38), demolished
- Foucher Tomb, St. Louis Cemetery #2 (1836)
- Dufilho Townhouse and Shop, 514 Chartres Street (1837)
- Irad Ferry Tomb, Cypress Grove Cemetery (1837)
- Olivier Townhouse, 828 Toulouse Street (1839)
- Kohn Tomb, Cypress Grove Cemetery (ca. 1840–41)
- St. Augustine Church, Bayou Road at St. Claude Street (1842)
- Peniston and Duplantier Families Mausoleum, St. Louis Cemetery #2 (1842)
- Mme. Avert House, 632 St. Peter Street (1842)
- Edouard Bertus House, 826 St. Louis Street (1842)
- Cazadores Tomb, St. Louis Cemetery #2 (1842-43)
- St. Charles (Camp Street, or American) Theater, Camp Street at Poydras Street (1842–43), burned 1899
- Iberian Society Tomb, St. Louis Cemetery No. 2 (1843)
- Remodeling of Théâtre d’Orléans, Orleans Street at Royal/Bourbon Streets (1845)
- Plauché Tomb, St. Louis Cemetery #2 (1845)
- Delachaise Tomb, St. Louis Cemetery #2 (1846)
- Lacoste Tomb, St. Louis Cemetery #2 (1849)
- Reconstruction of St. Louis Cathedral, Jackson Square (1849–50)
- Grailhe Shop, Poydras Street (1849)
- Grailhe Family Tomb, St. Louis Cemetery #2 (1850)
- Miltenberger Family Tomb, St. Louis Cemetery #2 (1850)
- McCall and Jones Families’ Tomb, St. Louis Cemetery #1 (1857)
- Puig tomb, St. Louis Cemetery #2 (1850s?)
- A.D. Crossman Monument, Greenwood Cemetery (1859)
- Society Tomb of the New Lusitanos Benevolent Association, Girod Street Cemetery (1859), demolished 1957
- Caballero Tomb, St. Louis Cemetery #2 (1860)
- Second District Asylum (Colored Waif's Home), Conti Street and City Park Avenue (1867)
- Maunsel White Tomb, Cypress Grove Cemetery (1869)
- St. Ann’s Church, St. Philip Street and Roman Street (1869), demolished 1971
- De Pouilly Family Tomb, St. Louis Cemetery #2 (1874)
- Bineau and Carrière Families Tomb, St. Louis Cemetery #2
- Societe Française Tomb, St. Louis Cemetery #1
