= Bank One Center =

Bank One Center may refer to:

- Bank One Center (Houston), a building in Texas
- Bank One Center (Charleston), one of the tallest buildings in Charleston, West Virginia

== Formerly named Bank One Center ==
- 1717 Main, in Dallas, Texas
- Chase Tower (Amarillo), Texas
- Chase Tower (Phoenix), Arizona
- Fifth Third Center (Cleveland), Cleveland, Ohio
- Place St. Charles, in New Orleans, Louisiana
- The Qube (Detroit), an office building

== Formerly named Bank One Tower ==
- Salesforce Tower (Indianapolis), Indiana
- 1125 17th Street, in Denver, Colorado
- Chase Tower (Oklahoma City), Oklahoma

== See also ==
- Bank One Corporation, bank in the United States acquired by JPMorgan Chase in 2004
- Chase Tower (Chicago), building formerly named Bank One Plaza
- Chase Tower (Milwaukee), building formerly named Bank One Plaza
