= Place St. Charles =

Skyscraper in New Orleans, Louisiana, US

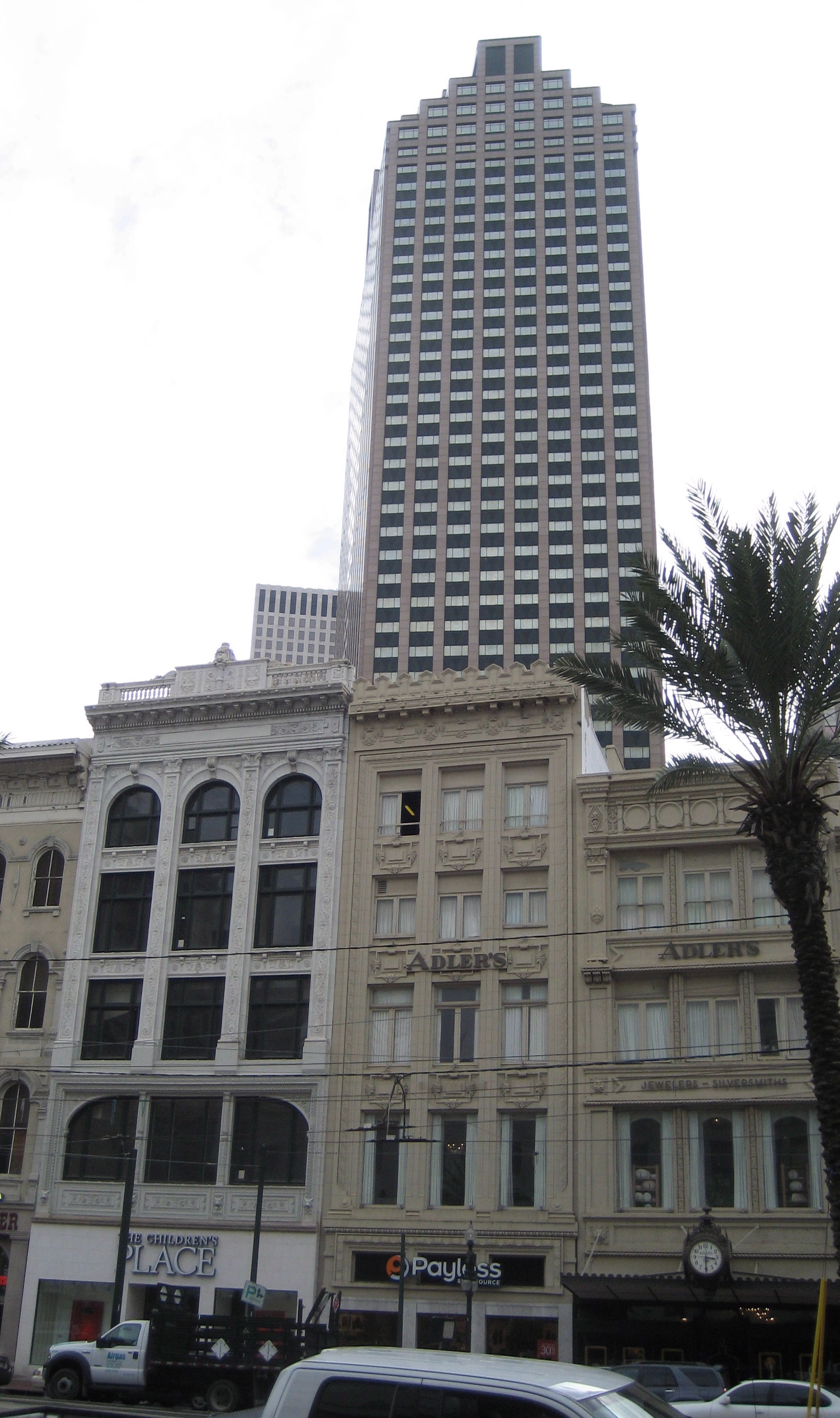
- Place St. Charles towers over 19th-century commercial buildings on Canal Street

General information
- Type: Office, Retail
- Location: 201 St. Charles Avenue New Orleans, Louisiana, United States
- Coordinates: 29°57′07″N 90°04′14″W
- Completed: 1984

Height
- Roof: 645 ft (197 m)

Technical details
- Floor count: 53
- Floor area: Office: 1,005,000 square feet (93,368 m^{2}); Retail: 58,000 square feet (5,388 m^{2})

Design and construction
- Architect(s): Moriyama & Teshima Architects

Place St. Charles (formerly the Bank One Center and First NBC Center), located at 201 St. Charles Avenue in the Central Business District of New Orleans, Louisiana, is a 53-story, 645-foot (197 m) skyscraper designed in the post-modern style by Moriyama & Teshima Architects with The Mathes Group, now Mathes Brierre Architects, as local architect. It is the second-tallest building in both the city of New Orleans and the state of Louisiana, and it is taller than Louisiana's tallest peak, Driskill Mountain.

The building is located on the site of the historic St. Charles Hotel. The first St. Charles Hotel was built in 1837 and burned down in 1851. The second St. Charles Hotel was built in 1853 and burned down in 1894. The third St. Charles Hotel was built in 1896 and demolished in 1974.

Floors 1 & 2 are used for retail space, 3 to 13 are parking levels, and 14 to 52 hold office space. St. Charles Place, LLC, is the current owner, while Corporate Realty leases the property. The building now also serves as the headquarters of the retail banking division of Capital One. The largest tenants are Capital One, JPMorgan Chase, Jones Walker LLP, and Energy Partners.

Place St. Charles opened in 1984. The exterior of the building is clad in granite and glass. A unique design aspect of the building are the French Quarter inspired balconies on the lower 3 levels along St. Charles Ave. Inside Place St. Charles, the first two floors house 58,000 square feet (5,388 m^{2}) of retail space, including two restaurants, a hair salon, a 10-station Food Court and a Chase branch location. The 11 levels of parking are accessed from Gravier Street. Additionally, there is an elevated walkway connecting the building to an adjoining Hampton Inn.

The building was the least damaged major high rise in the city during Hurricane Katrina in August 2005 and reopened by mid October 2005.

== Location ==
The building is located at 201 St. Charles Avenue in New Orleans, Louisiana. The building bears its own zip code, which is 70170.

The Place St. Charles is bounded by the following streets:

- St. Charles Avenue (southeast)
- Gravier Street (southwest)
- Adjoins to Hampton Inn on Carondelet Street (northwest)
- Common Street (northeast)

== See also ==
- List of tallest buildings in New Orleans
- List of tallest buildings in Louisiana
- Bank One Center - For other buildings currently or formerly named after Bank One
