= St. Charles Hotel, New Orleans =

Hotel in New Orleans, Louisiana, United States

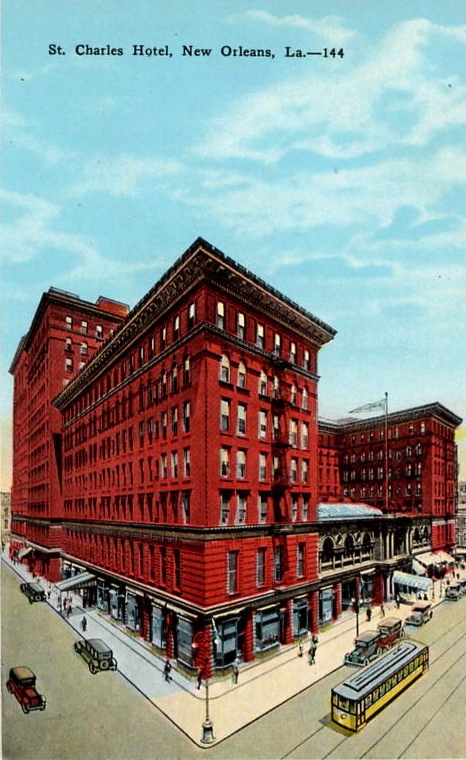
St. Charles Hotel, circa 1920s

The St. Charles Hotel was a hotel on St. Charles Avenue in New Orleans, Louisiana. One of the first of the great hotels of the United States, the original Grecian palace-style building, opened in 1837 and originally designed by James Dakin and James Gallier, has been described by author Richard Campanella as "one of the most splendid structures in the nation and a landmark of the New Orleans skyline". It was some time before it found a rival in the Astor House, of New York City. It was said that the hotel's Parlor P had probably witnessed more important political events than any room or any building in the country, outside of the Capitol at Washington, D.C. During the Civil War, Union General Benjamin Butler seized the hotel to use for his headquarters after the city surrendered. The third incarnation of the hotel was finally demolished in 1974.

== First building ==
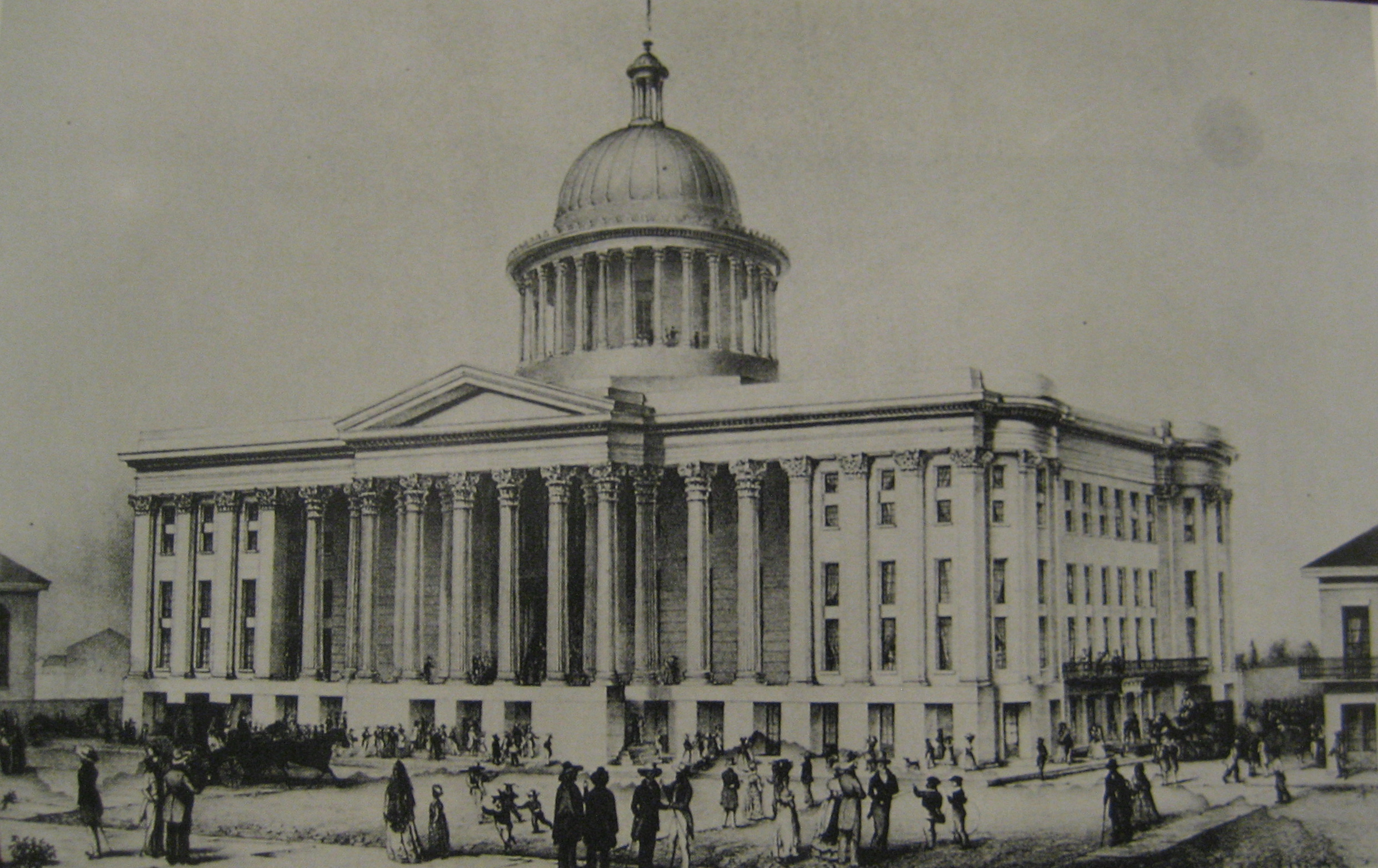
St. Charles, first building

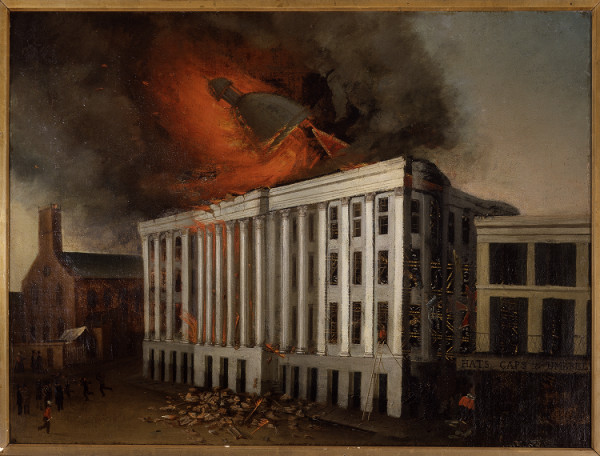
St Charles Hotel, 1851 fire

The old St. Charles or Exchange Hotel, as it was generally called, was commenced in the summer of 1835. It cost US$600,000 to build, in addition to the $100,000 paid for the ground, and was one of the first large buildings erected above Canal street. It had a neoclassical front, capped by a tall, white cupola, second in size to only the dome of the Capitol at Washington. Center with the cupola was a projecting portico of six Corinthian columns, from which a flight of marble steps led to the hotel. The bar-room in the basement was octagonal in shape, 70 feet (21 m) in diameter and 20 feet (6.1 m) high, having an exterior circle of Ionic columns. The architecture of this room was Ionic, and that of the saloon immediately over the ball room which was 18 feet (5.5 m) high, Corinthian. From the street, a flight of marble steps led to the lower saloon, at the summit of which was a handsome marble statue of Washington. From the saloon a grand spiral staircase continued up to the dome, with a gallery stretching around it on each of the upper stories. The dome was 46 feet (14 m) in diameter, surmounting an octagon building elevated upon an order of fluted columns. Above the dome was an elegant Corinthian turret. A circular room under the dome on the floor of which the spiral staircase terminated possessed a beautiful gallery, 11 feet (3.4 m) wide, from which the whole city could be seen, at a height of 185 feet (56 m).

The hotel opened in 1837 and was destroyed by fire on January 18, 1851.

One history of New Orleans described slave sales at the St. Charles: "These sales were held in the famous barroom of the hotel, a semi-circular room on the ground floor, with huge brick columns supporting the vast structure above. There were two auction blocks, one at each end of the bar, this one for male slaves, that one for females. Sometimes there were only a few negroes to be disposed of; sometimes there were a great many."

== Second building ==
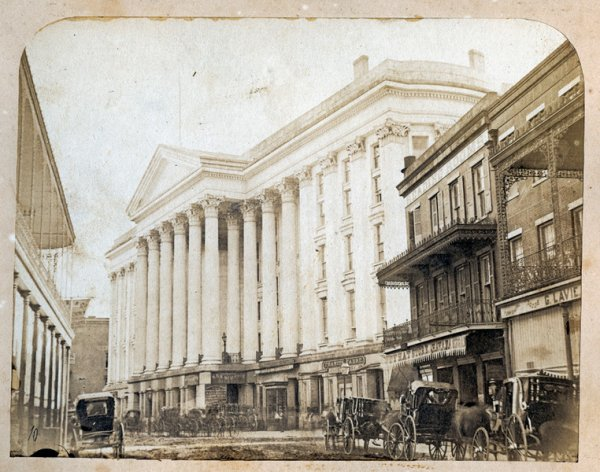
St. Charles, exterior, second building

St. Charles, depiction of interior, second building

A larger hotel was rebuilt at a cost of $800,000. Barker retained very little interest in the hotel, and took no part in the rebuilding. The second hotel opened in January 1853, during a time of political strife between 1851 and 1861, but became a highly successful venture. A British visitor of 1858 noted of the building, with accommodations for 1,000: "This hotel is a monster."

Col. R. E. Rivers, who was proprietor of the house, directed it, either alone or with a partner, from 1869. The office force consisted of Messrs. Kelsev, Mitchell, Davis and Wallace. In 1878, the St. Charles Hotel Company, who owned it, made $100,000 worth of improvements to the building, which thoroughly modernized it and gave it additional rooms. In 1888, the house had 400 rooms, accommodation for between 600 and 700 guests. There were 30 parlors and 100 bathrooms. It peaked in popularity during the Mardi Gras, when the building often became overcrowded. The gold service of the hotel, estimated to be worth $16,000, was only used on extraordinary occasions. The second hotel burned down too, on April 28, 1894.

== Third building ==
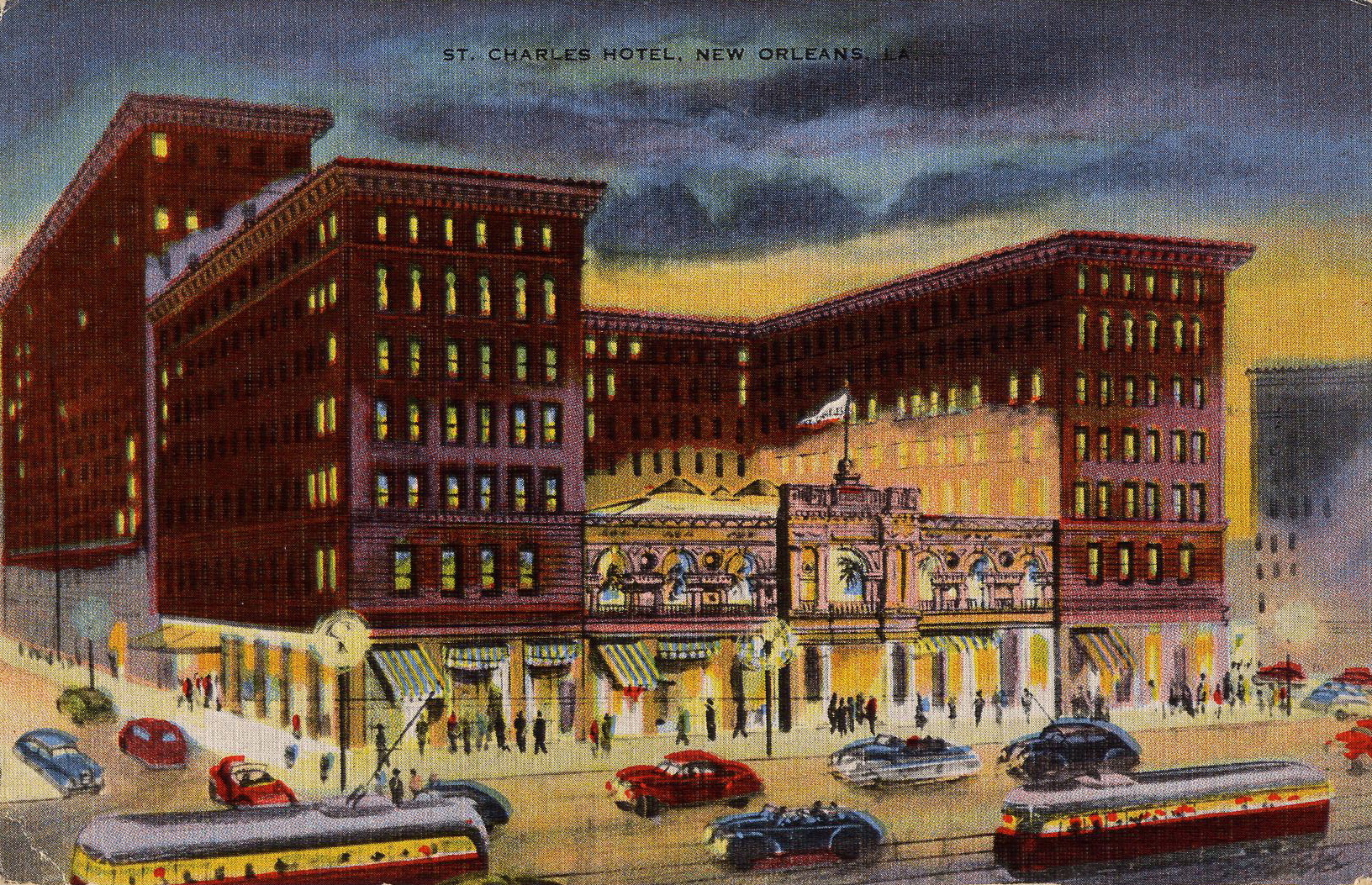
St. Charles, third building

The third St. Charles Hotel opened on February 1, 1896. One author mentions that this building had "strings of colored lights" along its "mezzanine balcony", and contained trees in the hotel lobby.

The 1956 Sugar Bowl after-game dinner banquet was hosted here with civil rights icon Bobby Grier. Sheraton Hotels bought the St. Charles in 1959 for $5 million and renamed it the Sheraton-Charles Hotel. The hotel was sold to local developer Louis J. Roussel Jr. in 1965, though Sheraton continued to operate it. On August 5, 1973, Roussell announced he would redevelop the site of the Sheraton-Charles. It closed and was demolished in 1974. The planned replacements, a 56-story office tower and a 40-story, 800-room hotel to be named the Grand St. Charles Hotel, were never built. Instead the lot sat vacant for nearly a decade, until the Place St. Charles tower was erected in 1984.

== See also ==
- St. Louis Hotel
