= Omni Royal Orleans =

Hotel in New Orleans, Louisiana (USA)

Coordinates: 29.9563°N 90.0656°W

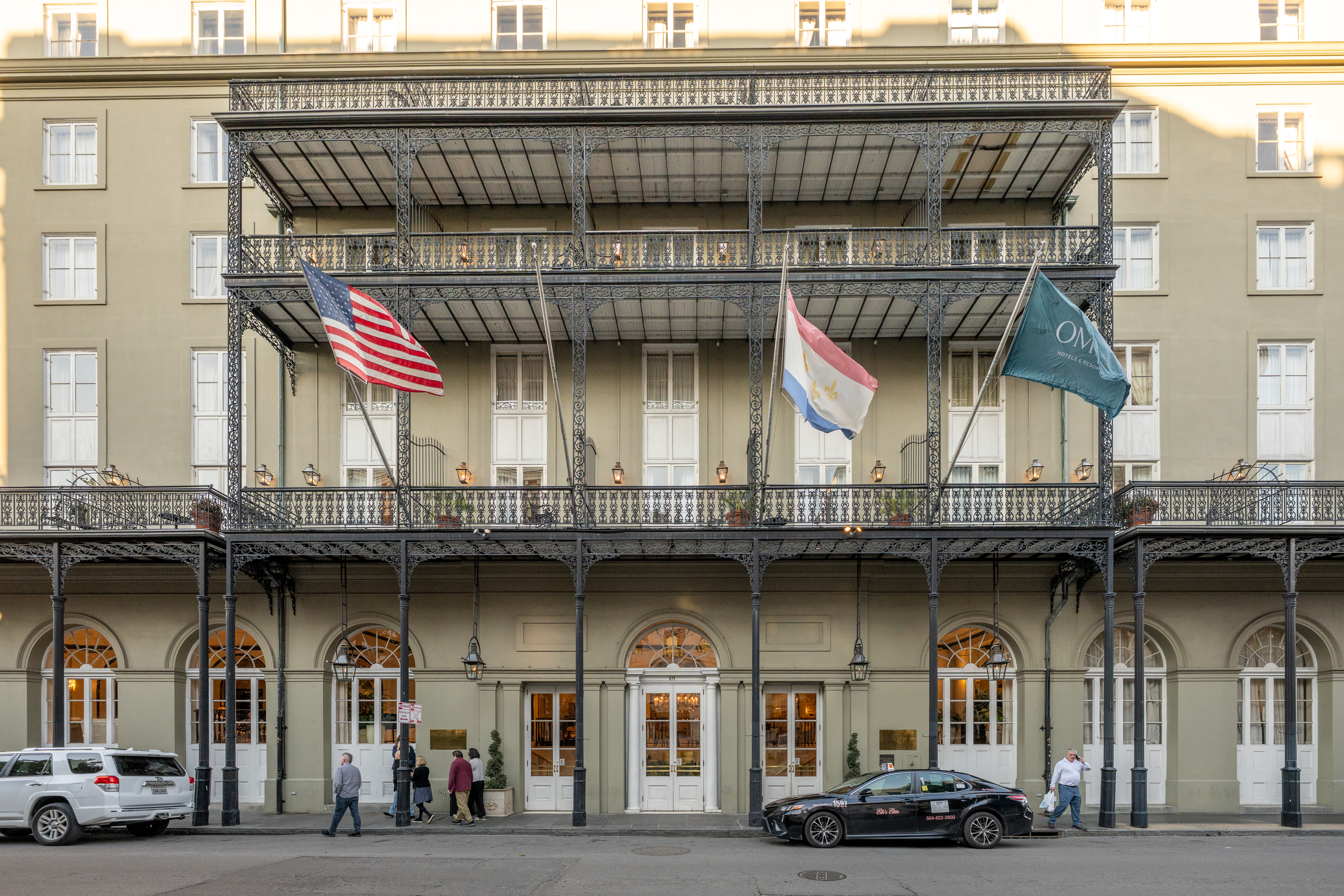
Omni Royal Orleans (2026)

The Omni Royal Orleans is a 345-room hotel on the corner of St. Louis and Royal Streets near Jackson Square in the French Quarter of New Orleans, Louisiana. It was constructed in 1960 as The Royal Orleans Hotel, on the site of the old St. Louis Hotel, which was completely destroyed in the 1915 New Orleans hurricane. Earlier the site had been The City Exchange, a slave auction site until the 1830s.

The exterior was designed by architect Samuel Wilson Jr., while the interior was designed by Arthur Davis.

The hotel has been rated four diamonds by AAA. Its address is 621 St. Louis Street. A partnership led by Darryl Berger, Jr., and the Berger Company, Inc., purchased the Royal Orleans in 2008.

The Omni Royal Orleans is a member of Historic Hotels of America, an official program of the National Trust for Historic Preservation.

The Grand Salon ballroom of the Omni Royal Orleans has been a popular location for social events among New Orleans families for decades. The hotel's restaurant, the Rib Room, is frequented by many of the city's politicians and attorneys, particularly at lunch on Fridays. It is often called the "Royal O" or just "the Royal" by New Orleanians.

Jazz pianist and composer Armand Hug had a steady gig at the Royal Orleans for decades. The job was later filled by the noted New Orleans composer and professor of music Roger Dickerson, and subsequently by another local pianist, Bob Ellis.

After Hurricane Katrina, the hotel was used as a headquarters for the New Orleans Police Department. It suffered no damage from the storm.

== Notable guests ==
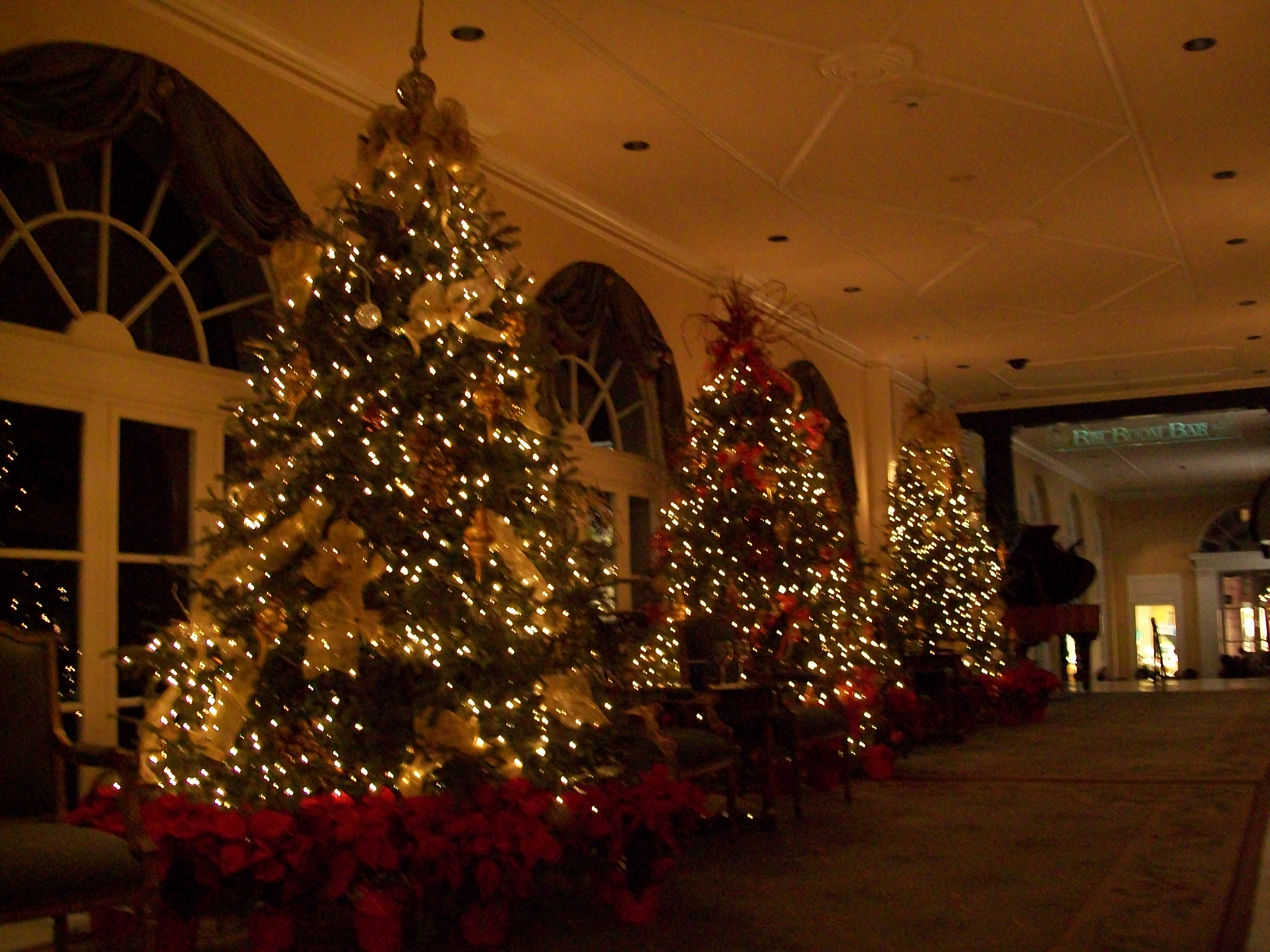
Lobby of Omni Royal Orleans, at the corner of Royal and St. Louis streets; Christmas trees

Among many notable guests who have stayed at the hotel are Louis Armstrong and the Rolling Stones.

== In popular culture ==
- In Live and Let Die (1973), James Bond stays at the Royal Orleans.
- The Led Zeppelin song "Royal Orleans" is purportedly based on an incident involving the band members at the hotel during the 1970s.
- In 1965, the Royal Orleans was mentioned in Arthur Hailey's novel Hotel as being arguably the best hotel in North America.
