= Franklin and Armfield Office =

Historic house in Virginia, United States

- U.S. National Register of Historic Places
- U.S. National Historic Landmark
- Virginia Landmarks Register
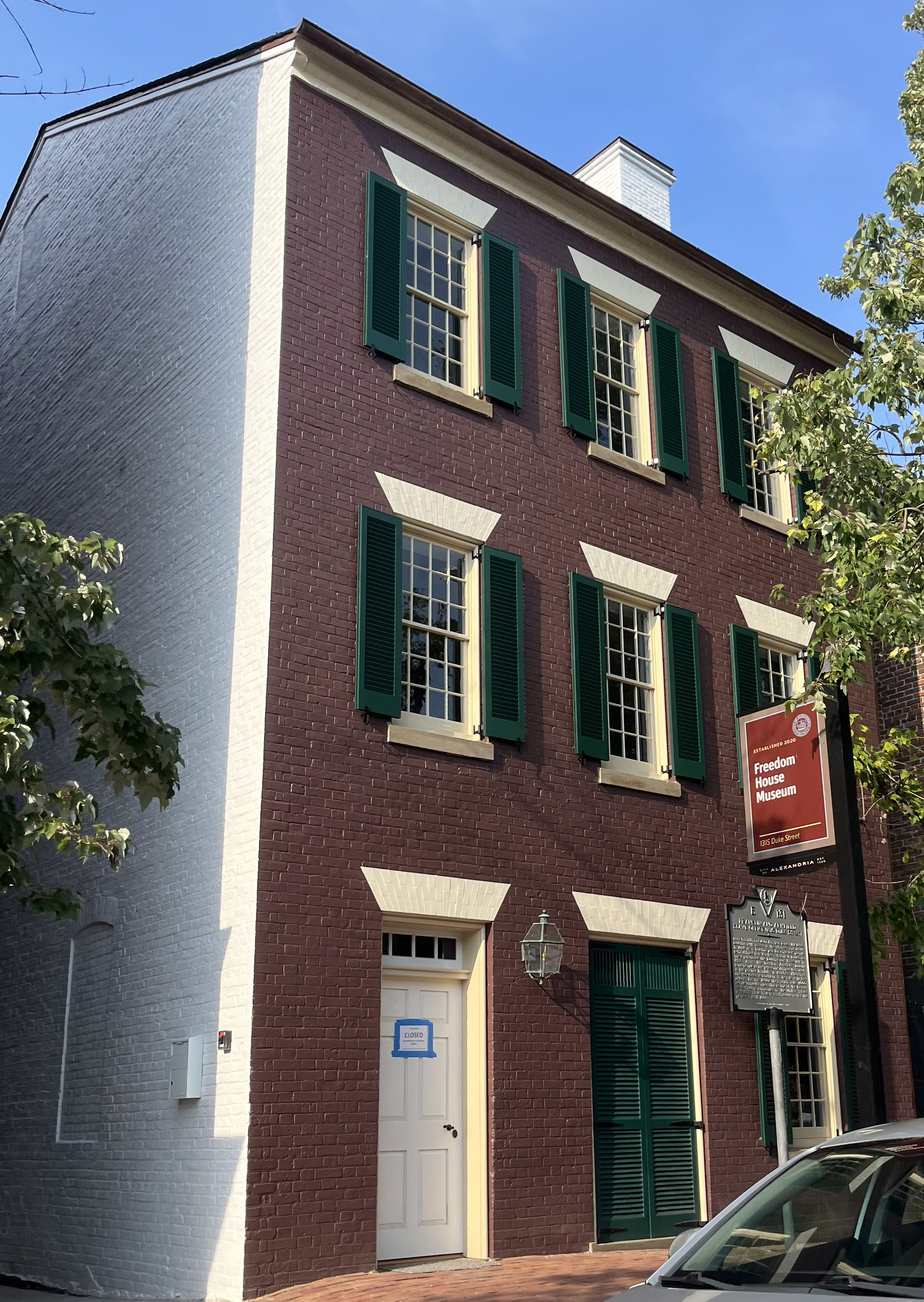
- Freedom House in 2025, following comprehensive exterior renovations

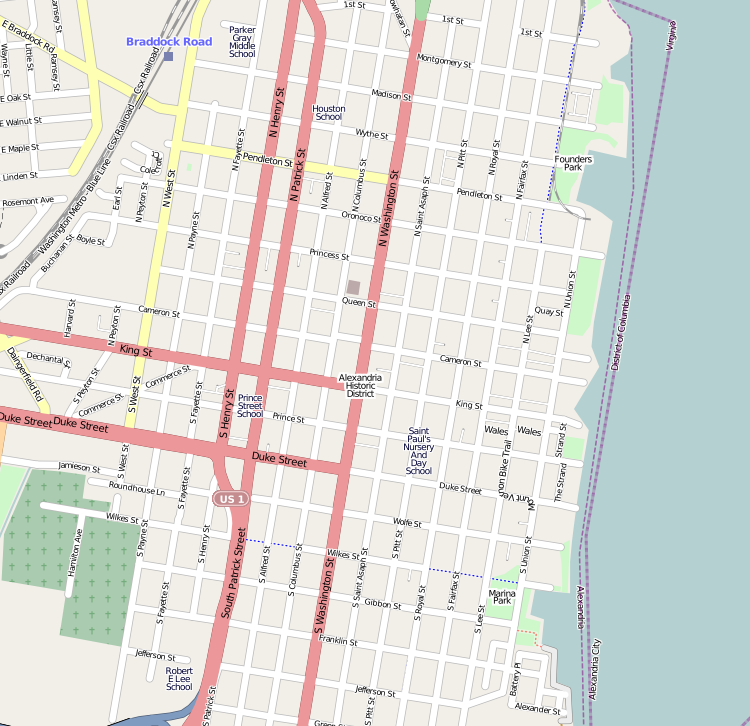
- Location within Alexandria Historical District Location within Northern Virginia Location within Virginia Location within the United States
- Location: 1315 Duke Street, Alexandria, Virginia
- Coordinates: 38°48′14″N 77°3′17″W
- Area: 27 acres (11 ha)
- Built: 1810
- Architect: Robert Young
- Architectural style: Federal
- NRHP reference No.: 78003146
- VLR No.: 100-0105

Significant dates
- Added to NRHP: June 2, 1978
- Designated NHL: June 2, 1978
- Designated VLR: October 16, 1979

The Franklin and Armfield Office, which houses the Freedom House Museum, is a historic commercial building in Alexandria, Virginia (until 1846, the District of Columbia). Built c. 1810–1820, it was first used as a private residence before being converted to the offices of the largest slave trading firm in the United States, started in 1828 by Isaac Franklin and John Armfield. Ship manifests from the National Archives indicate that at least 5,000 slaves were trafficked through the office and its now-demolished slave pens.

The building at 1315 Duke Street is located just west of Alexandria's Old Town. Its exterior, which was renovated in a vernacular Empire style after the building was subdivided into apartments, was restored to its original Federal appearance in 2025.

The building was designated a National Historic Landmark in 1978, and has also been designated a Virginia Historic Landmark. The building was formerly owned by the Northern Virginia Urban League, which used the building for offices and a museum. The City of Alexandria purchased the building in March 2020 and reopened it as a museum in June 2022.

== History ==
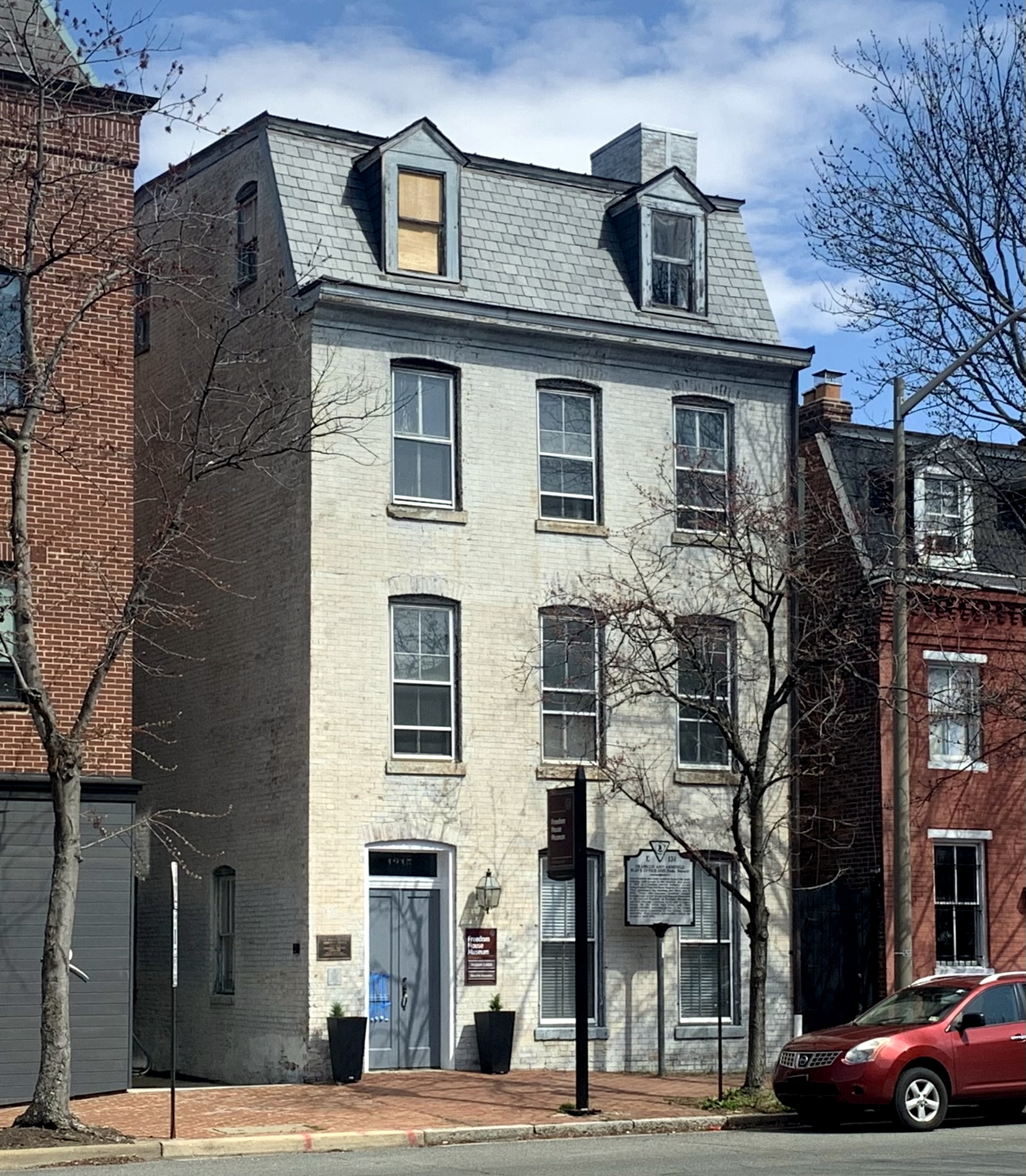
The exterior of the building as it appeared between a c. 1905 residential renovation and 2025 restoration

The building was constructed as a residence in the 1810s by Robert Young, a brigadier general in the District of Columbia Militia. A three-bayed townhouse built in the Federal style, the front facade was laid in Flemish bond and the sides and rear of the building in common bond. Due to financial struggles, Young was soon afterward forced to sell the house.

=== Franklin & Armfield ===
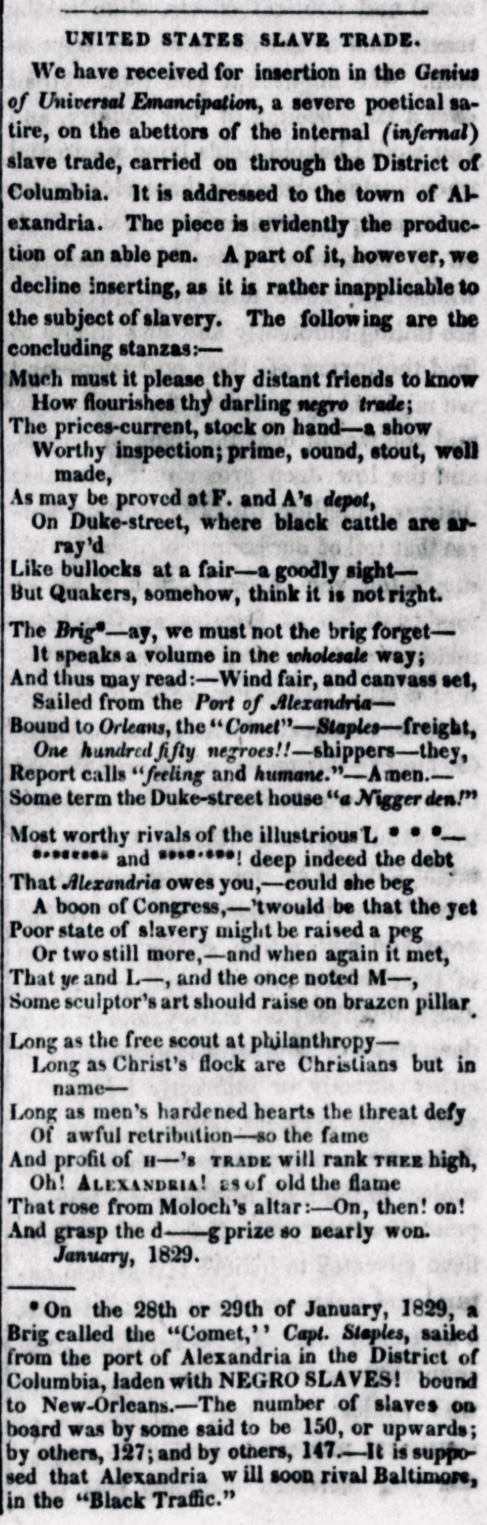
The building was already recognized as Franklin & Armfield's slave pen in September 1829, when Benjamin Lundy annotated this poem in Genius of Universal Emancipation with a description of the brig Comet, possibly the same coastwise slave ship that later landed in the British West Indies, resulting in the freedom of the prisoners on board

The building was purchased in 1828 by Isaac Franklin and his intimate friend and nephew-by-marriage John Armfield, who established it as their Washington-area office, and the residence of Armfield.

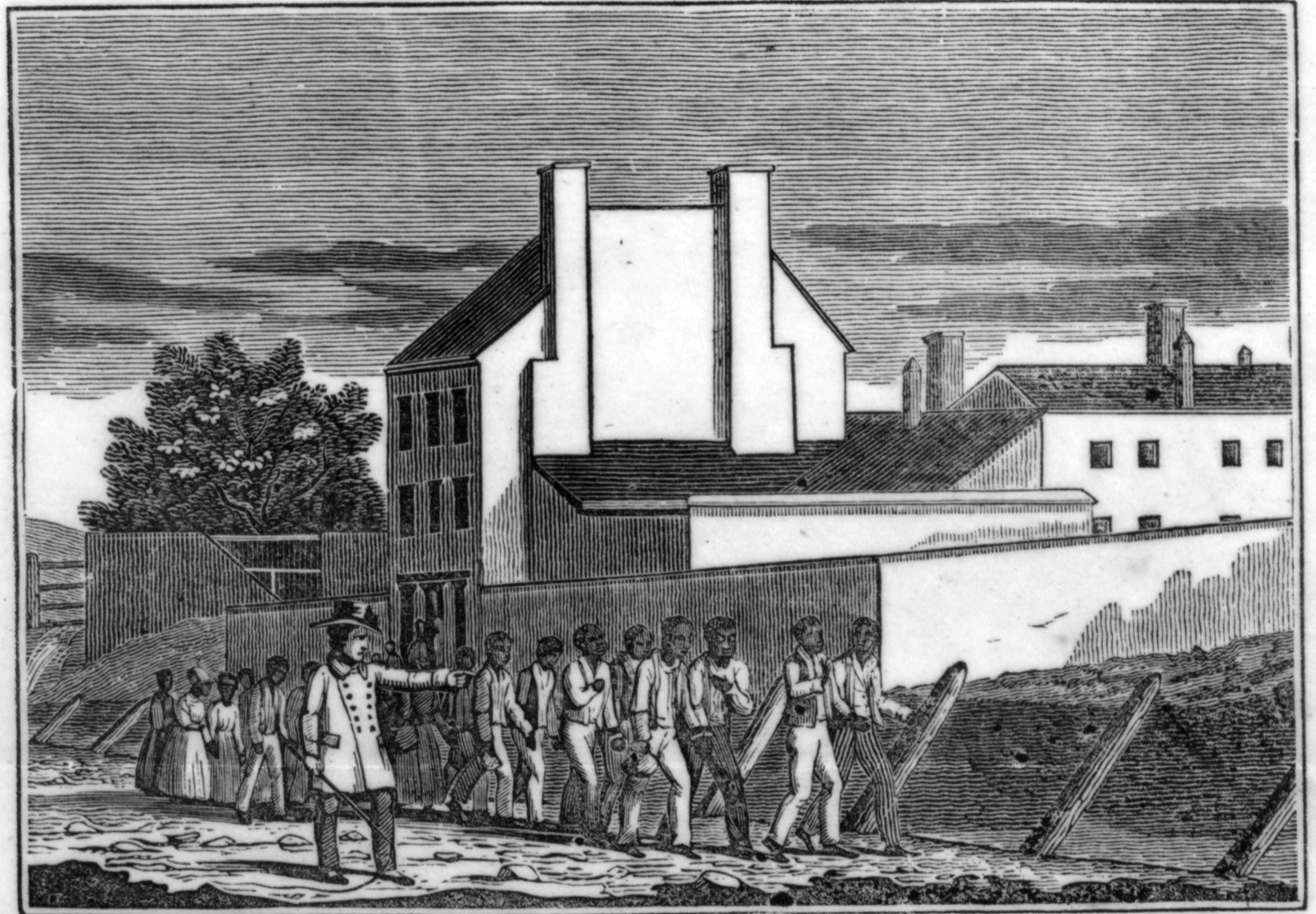
The Franklin and Armfield house with its neighboring slave pens in 1836.

Cash in Market.

The subscribers having leased for a term of years the large three story brick house on Duke Street, in the town of Alexandria, D.C. formerly occupied by Gen. Young, we wish to purchase one hundred and fifty likely young negroes of both sexes, between the ages of 8 and 25 years. Persons who wish to sell will do well to give us a call, as we are determined to give more than any other purchasers that are in market, or that may hereafter come into market.

Any letters addressed to the subscribers through the Post Office at Alexandria, will be promptly attended to. For information, enquire at the above described house, as we can at all times be found there.

FRANKLIN & ARMFIELD

— advertisement in the Alexandria Phoenix Gazette, May 17, 1828

The property then extended further east, and they added structures for holding and trading in slaves. They also provided, for 25¢ a day, housing in their jail for slaveowners visiting Washington. The two-story extension to the rear of this house was part of the slave-holding facilities, which included high walls, and interior chambers that featured prison-like grated doors and windows.

The firm also commissioned three slave ships for use as packets. One of their ads describing these was reprinted in William I. Bowditch's Slavery and the Constitution (1849): "ALEXANDRIA AND NEW ORLEANS PACKETS. — Brig Tribune, Samuel C. Bush, master, will sail as above on the 1st January; brig Isaac Franklin, William Smith, master, on the 15th January; brig Uncas, Nathaniel Boush, master, on the 1st February. They will continue to leave this port on the 1st and 15th of each month, throughout the shipping season. Servants that are intended to be shipped will at any time be received for safe keeping at twenty-five cents a day. JOHN ARMFIELD, Alexandria."

Circa 1833–34, Franklin & Armfield had trading agents in at least five cities:

- R. C. Ballard & Co., Richmond, Va.
- J. M. Saunders & Co., Warrenton, Va.
- George Kephart & Co., Fredericktown, Md.
- James F. Purvis & Co., Baltimore
- Thomas M. Jones, Easton, Eastern Shore, Md.

Other agents associated with Franklin & Armfield included:

- John Ware, Port Tobacco, Md.
- William Hooper, Annapolis, Maryland
- A. Grimm, Fredericksburg, Virginia.

Franklin left the business, starting in 1835, and Armfield sold the property to their former trading agent George Kephart in 1836.

Franklin and Armfield sold more enslaved people, separated more families, and made more money from the trade than almost anyone else in the United States. They amassed a fortune equalling billions in today's dollars (2021) and were two of the nation's richest men. Franklin sold slaves from an office in Natchez, Mississippi, with branch offices in New Orleans, St. Francisville, and Vidalia, Louisiana. His nephew Armfield handled the supply, sending agents door-to-door in Virginia, Maryland, and Delaware looking for enslaved people their owners might like to sell, and arranging transportation.

Maryland and Virginia had surpluses of slaves and spoke of slaves as an export, like livestock. As portrayed in Uncle Tom's Cabin, there was a vast, internal forced migration of enslaved people from the Upper South to the Lower South, and Franklin and Armfield were central to that business. "In surviving correspondence, they actually brag about raping enslaved people who they’ve been processing through the firm."

=== Price, Birch and Co. ===
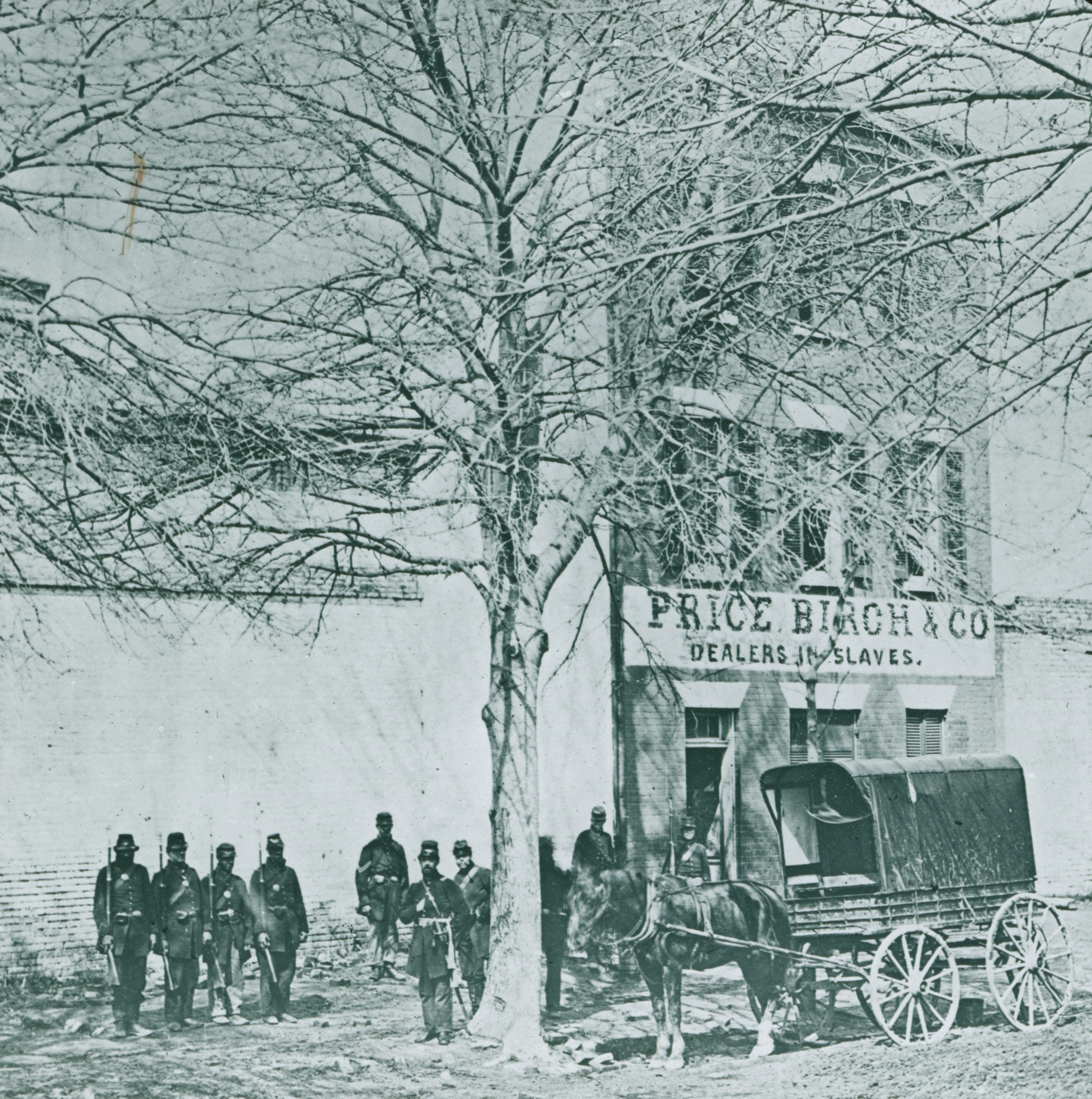
"Price Birch & Co Dealers in Slaves", Alexandria, Virginia, 1862

From 1858, the building was occupied by Price, Birch & Co. an American slave trading company founded in 1858 by George Kephart, William Birch, J. C. Cook, and Charles M. Price.

Price, Birch & Co. ceased business in 1861. Arriving at the Duke street office of the company on May 14, 1861, the Union Army discovered that "The firm had fled, and taken with them all but one of the humans that they sold as slaves — an old man, chained to the middle of the floor by the leg." A letter to the Liberator in 1862 stated, "It is now occupied as a Police Office, and occasionally as a prison for rebel soldiers. The dungeons on the ground floor, formerly used for refractory slaves, are horrible dens, without a chance for ventilation; they look like a row of gas retorts." Union forces had possession of the building until February 2, 1866, using it as a military prison. Late in the war, it was used as L'Ouverture Hospital for black soldiers, and as housing for contrabands.

=== Use after the Civil War ===
After the war, the building's outlying slave pens, of which there are photographs, were torn down. The bricks may have been reused in the construction of the adjacent townhouses. The building was repurposed for residential use, being subdivided into apartments, in the late 19th century. Around 1905, the exterior was renovated in a vernacular iteration of the then-fashionable empire style.

In 2005, the Virginia Department of Historic Resources erected the following marker in front of the building:

Franklin and Armfield
Slave Office (1315 Duke Street)

Isaac Franklin and John Armfield leased this brick building with access to the wharves and docks in 1828 as a holding pen for enslaved people being shipped from northern Virginia to Louisiana. They purchased the building and three lots in 1832. From this location Armfield bought bondspeople at low prices and shipped them south to his partner Franklin, in Natchez, Mississippi, and New Orleans, Louisiana, to be sold at higher prices. By the 1830s they often sold 1,000 people annually, operating as one of the largest slave-trading companies in the United States until 1836. Slave traders continually owned the property until 1861.

== Freedom House Museum ==
The Northern Virginia Urban League purchased the building in the 1990s and installed an exhibit in the basement. The rest of the building was used for offices and classroom space.

The Office of Historic Alexandria partnered with the Northern Virginia Urban League in February 2018 in an effort to maintain and interpret the building. The Urban League received $50,000 from the National Trust for Historic Preservation's African American Cultural Heritage Action Fund that same year.

The City of Alexandria purchased the building from the Urban League in March 2020.

The Freedom House Museum reopened in June 2022. It houses three exhibits that tell the story of the Black experience in Alexandria and the United States.

The museum's exterior was restored between June 2024 and July 2025. In addition to securing the structure, the restoration intended to return the building to its appearance during the "period of significance", i.e. the time during which it was used as a slave trading firm. Using period photographs as references, restorers oversaw the removal of the c. 1905 exterior features and the recreation of the original federal-style facade.

== See also ==
- Alexandria Black History Museum
- Contrabands and Freedmen Cemetery
- List of National Historic Landmarks in Virginia
- Lumpkin's Jail
- National Register of Historic Places listings in Alexandria, Virginia
- Slave trade in the United States
- Slave markets and slave jails in the United States
- List of American slave traders
