= Isaac Franklin =

American slave trader (1789–1846)

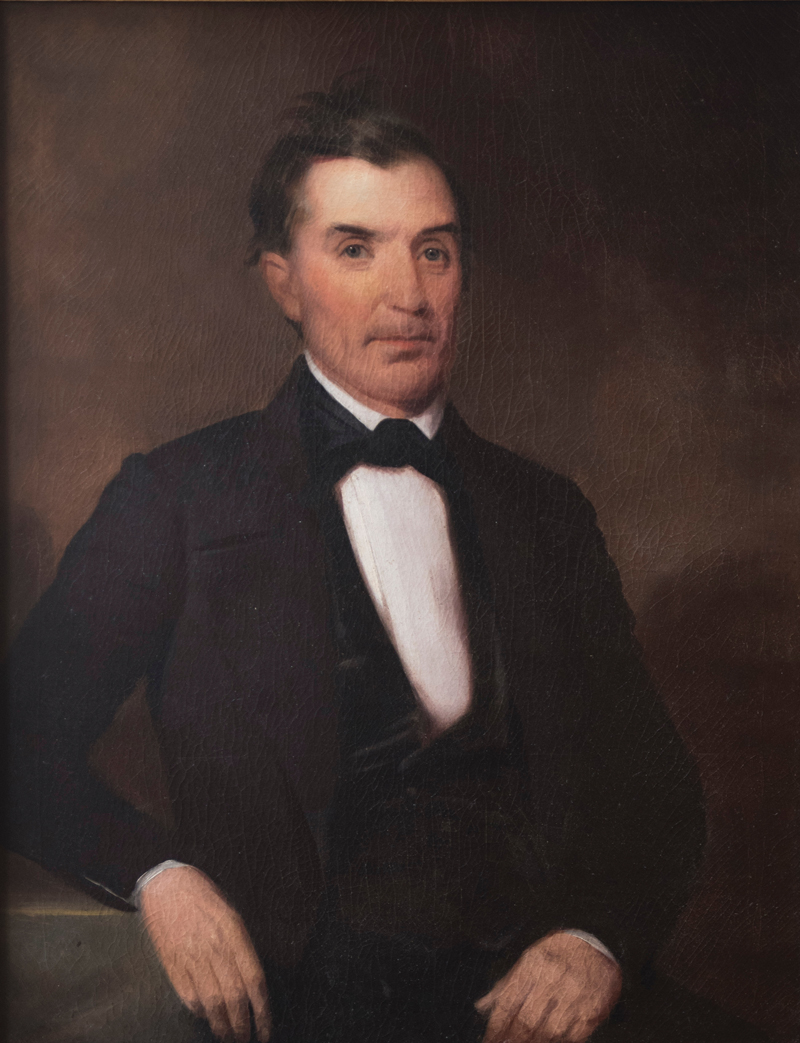
- Portrait by Washington Bogart Cooper, c. 1844
- Born: May 26, 1789; Sumner County, Tennessee, U.S.
- Died: April 27, 1846 (aged 56); Bellevue Plantation, West Feliciana Parish, Louisiana, U.S.
- Resting place: Fairvue, Tennessee, U.S.
- Occupations: Slave trader; Planter
- Known for: Co-founder of Franklin & Armfield
- Spouse: Adelicia Hayes
- Children: 4
- Relatives: James F. Purvis (nephew)
- Military career
- Allegiance: United States
- Branch: Tennessee militia
- Service years: 1813–1814
- Rank: Lieutenant
- Unit: 2nd Regiment of Volunteer Mounted Riflemen
- Conflict: War of 1812; Creek War; Tallushatchee; Talladega

Isaac Franklin (May 26, 1789 – April 27, 1846) was an American slave trader and plantation owner. Born to wealthy planters in what would become Sumner County, Tennessee, he assisted his brothers in trading slaves and agricultural surplus along the Mississippi River in his youth, before briefly serving in the Tennessee militia during the War of 1812. He returned to slave trading soon after the war, buying enslaved people in Virginia and Maryland, before marching them in coffles to sale at Natchez, Mississippi. He introduced John Armfield to the slave trade, and with him founded the Franklin & Armfield partnership in 1828, which would go on to become one of the largest slave trading firms in the United States. With a base of operations in Alexandria, D.C., the company shipped massive numbers of the enslaved by land and sea to markets at Natchez and New Orleans.

During his time with the partnership, Franklin mainly managed slave sales in the Lower Mississippi. Innovations such as coastwise shipping and easy extensions of long credit to slaveholders brought him great wealth, with the partnership likely becoming the largest slave trading firm during its peak of operations. Many rival slave traders were either pushed out of the market or hired as purchasing partners for the company, further expanding its corporate reach. Although temporarily able to circumvent the imposition of slave trade restrictions in Louisiana, he began to mainly focus on sales at his Natchez property, working alongside his nephew James Franklin Purvis. Public outrage forced him out of Natchez in 1833, after he was discovered to have buried the bodies of slaves who had died of cholera in shallow ditches and gullies. He relocated operations to the Forks of the Road market outside city limits, where he continued to work until his retirement from slave trading in 1835. Amassing a great fortune from his slave trading, he was able to purchase a large property in West Feliciana Parish, Louisiana, in addition to his main Fairvue Plantation in Tennessee. He married Adelicia Hayes in 1839, and with her had four children. At the time of his death from a stomach illness in April 1846, he kept 636 men, women, and children in slavery.

== Early life and family ==
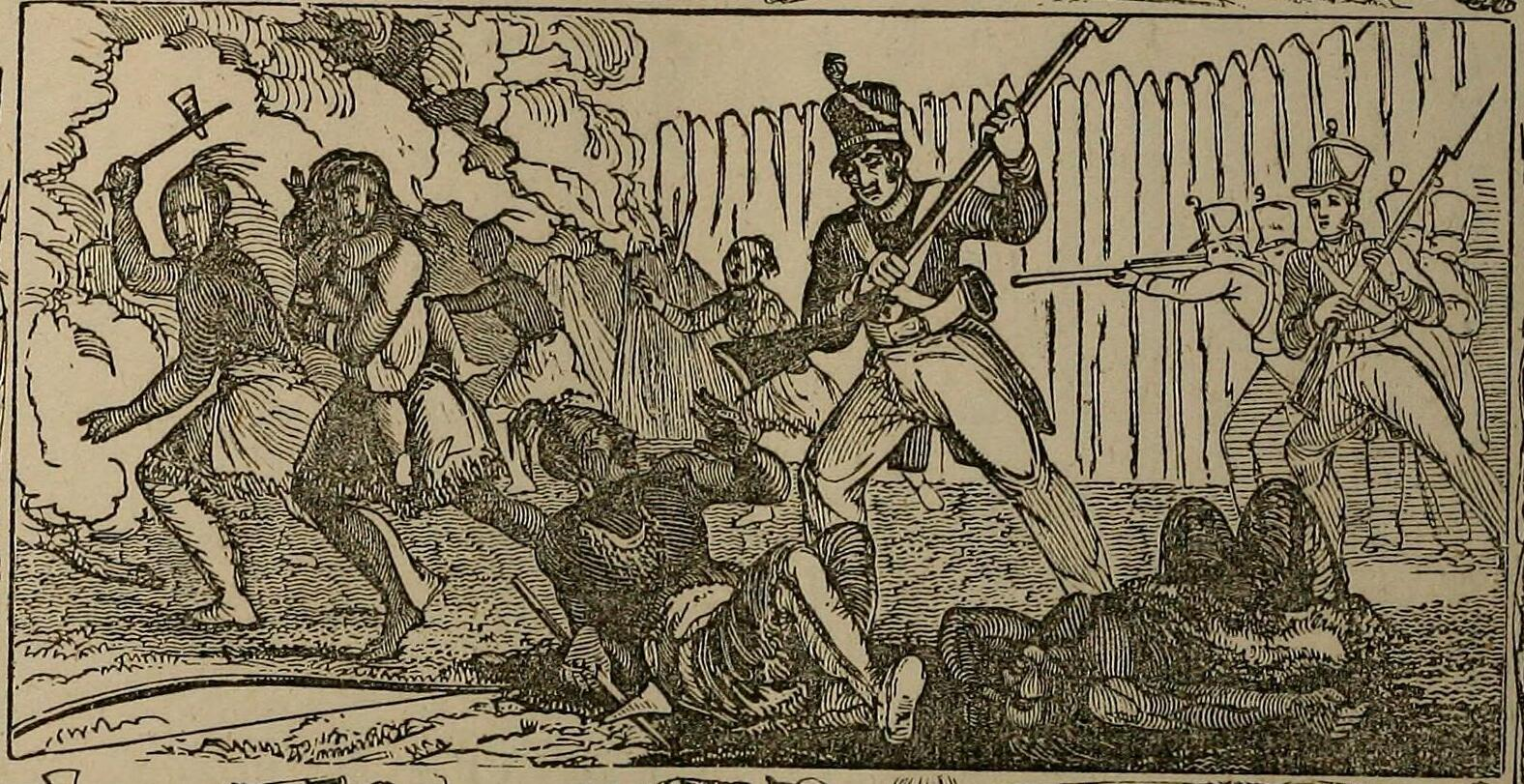
1852 depiction of John Coffee and the Tennessee militia attacking the Creek

Isaac Franklin was born on May 26, 1789, to frontier settlers Mary (née Lauderdale) and James Franklin Sr. at Station Camp Creek in Sumner County, then part of western North Carolina. James Franklin Sr. was likely born in Maryland to a Huguenot refugee. He settled in the Cumberland basin prior to the American Revolution and entered work as a longhunter. He served in territorial defense during Lord Dunmore's War and the American Revolutionary War under James Robertson, and assisted in the construction of frontier forts. He married Mary Lauderdale, the daughter of his employer, when she was 13. The two would go on to have nine children. Following a land grant for his Revolutionary War service by the North Carolina Assembly, James Franklin amassed hundreds of acres of property along the north shore of the Cumberland River, alongside a significant number of slaves. By the end of the 1810s, he owned 26 enslaved people. The Cumberland was an early center of the regional slave trade during the first decade of the 1800s, with slaves commonly leased, used to pay debts, purchase property, given as prizes for lotteries, or as gifts for children. Franklin's property, including his slaves, was portioned among his children following his death in 1828.

As a child, Isaac Franklin attended a rural school while working on his father's farm, where he received what an obituary described as the "mere rudiments of education". With the outbreak of the War of 1812, he joined an outfit of the Tennessee militia in the fall of 1813, which eventually became part of the 2nd Regiment of Volunteer Mounted Riflemen under Colonel Newton Cannon and Brigadier General John Coffee in the Creek War. Franklin was promoted to the rank of lieutenant and served in various battles against the Creeks, including at the Battle of Tallushatchee and under Andrew Jackson's command at Talladega. He left the army in 1814, and briefly entered a protracted business dispute with Gabriel Tichenor, the cashier of the Mississippi Territory's sole bank. In 1815, he settled in a 132-acre plot five miles west of Gallatin, Tennessee, purchased from his father.

== Early career ==
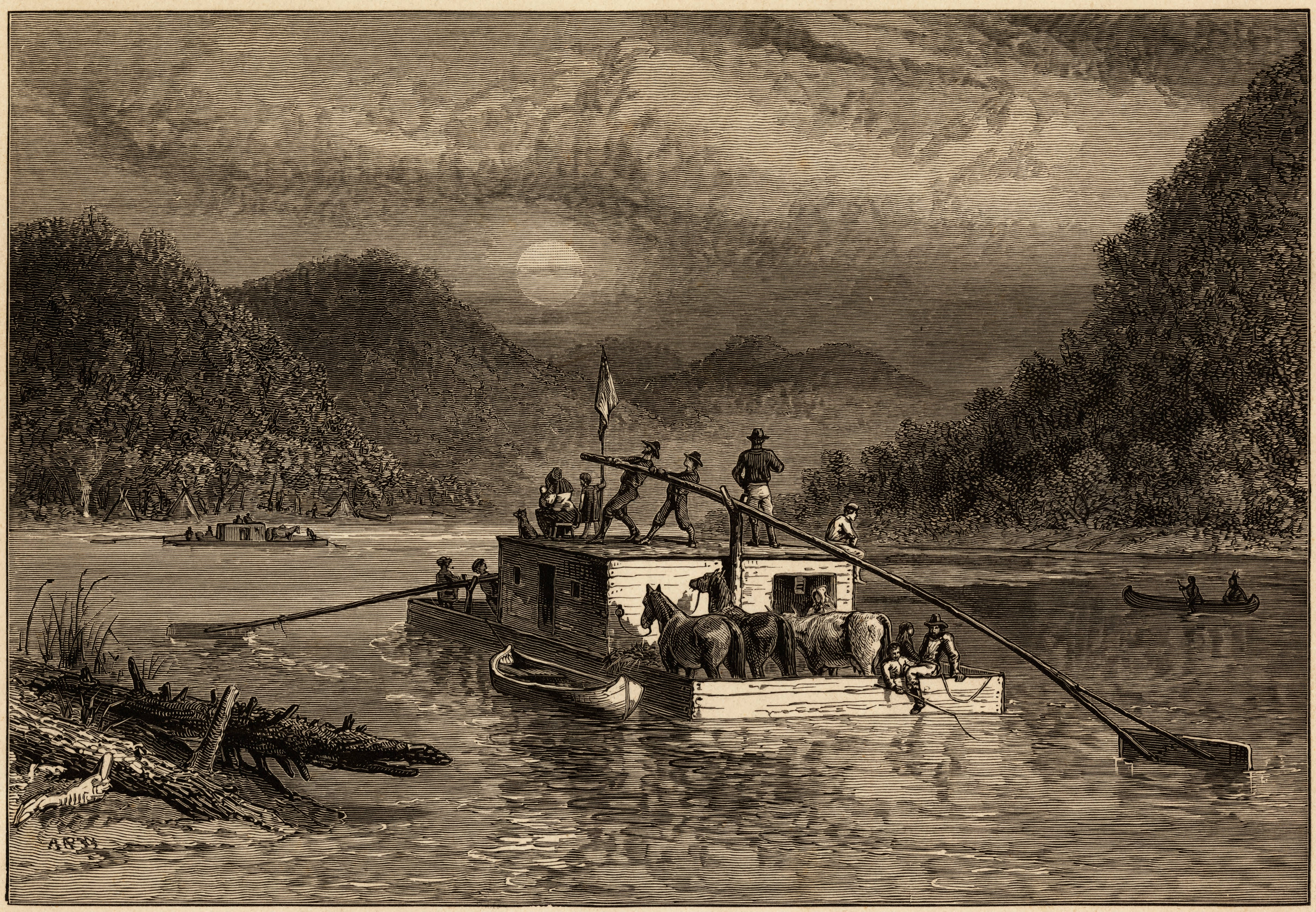
Late 19th-century depiction of a Tennessee flatboat

In 1807, the eighteen-year-old Franklin was hired by his older brothers, James and John Franklin, to sail by flatboat from Gallatin to market at New Orleans via the Cumberland, Ohio, and Mississippi rivers. Although they ferried agricultural surplus, they primarily sold, purchased, and bartered enslaved peoples along the journey. The two older brothers frequently traveled to Maryland to purchase slaves, before returning to Tennessee and sailing downriver to sell them in the Mississippi Territory. After one such journey in early 1809, James Franklin Jr. had acquired bills of exchange worth several thousand dollars as payment for slaves, which required cashing at the Brown & Ives firm in Providence, Rhode Island. John and Isaac were sent east to acquire slaves and cash the bills. The two departed in August or September 1809, crossing the Great Appalachian Valley into southwestern Virginia, before continuing to Maryland. John stayed in Maryland, purchasing slaves in Baltimore or Alexandria, while Isaac proceeded by ship to Providence. He was unable to cash the bills of exchange, as Brown & Ives claimed that the account holders lacked the funds to pay the bills. Returning to Maryland, the two brought a small coffle of the enslaved through the six-hundred-mile journey to Tennessee. James and Isaac proceeded to sell the slaves in Natchez and New Orleans, but were unsuccessful in receiving payment for the outstanding bills of exchange, eventually selling them at a discount in Nashville.

Demand for slaves in the Old Southwest dramatically increased after the War of 1812, following the migration of large numbers of white settlers in the region, as well as a process of indigenous land seizure culminating in the Indian removal. By 1819, Franklin fully committed to the interstate slave trade. His older brothers had largely retired from slave trading, settling on their plantations after marriage. Isaac Franklin continued slave trading, largely due to personal enjoyment and talent for the industry. Franklin's earliest recorded bill of sale was in July 1819. During the early portion of his career, he likely purchased slaves in Tennessee, who were then transported by river to Natchez. Slaves were generally unconstrained on-deck, but were chained together in pairs when the boat docked for provisions.

By 1821, he mainly purchased from the mid-Atlantic, including Maryland and Virginia in particular. In May 1821, he placed advertisements in the National Intelligencer inquiring to purchase "18 or 20 likely young negro boys and girls" while staying at Tennison's Hotel in Washington. Franklin traveled frequently across large portions of Virginia and Maryland, making slave purchases at various hotels, taverns, and courthouses. He paid to stow the enslaved at local jails, occasionally leading to jailbreaks and manhunts for the fugitive slaves. James Franklin Jr. rented a two-acre property in Alexandria, likely to serve as a base of operations and "holding pen" for his brother's trade in exchange for payment. In 1819, Franklin was sued by a planter in Mississippi for selling him six "lame, blind, consumptive, cancerous, and otherwise diseased" slaves.

Due to its access to the Mississippi and the Natchez Trace, Natchez emerged as one of the most important slave-trading hubs in the United States, alongside the major city of New Orleans further downriver. In the spring of 1821, Franklin and his younger brother William acquired a house several blocks outside of the Natchez city limits, likely purchased through the sale of three slaves to the former property owners. Unlike the "makeshift pens" used by itinerant slave traders in Natchez, the Franklin brothers' facility was a sizeable complex able to confine many enslaved people at once. The shop was possibly the first permanent slave business in Natchez. After several years of work, William retired, but John's eldest son, Smith Franklin, began work with Isaac in his stead. They continued operations in Natchez, acquiring additional properties adjacent to their shop. He hired agents in Virginia and Maryland to purchase slaves for his sales, occasionally traveling to the region to supervise purchases. The enslaved were transported overland to Natchez in coffles of several dozen people.

== Franklin & Armfield ==
In 1824, Franklin met John Armfield, a former shopkeeper likely working as a stagecoach driver in Virginia. Although older narratives claim Armfield was immediately hired as a business assistant in Tennessee, little evidence points to a formal business relationship for several years. However, Armfield, advised by Franklin, entered the slave trading industry in Guilford County, North Carolina.

=== Early operations ===
Franklin and Armfield, while not having previously worked together, became familiar with each other through trading in Natchez and Alexandria. On February 28, 1828, the Franklin & Armfield partnership was officially formed, with the agreement renewed every five years, longer than many slave trading partnerships. Although the original "articles of co-partnership" have been lost, both men likely contributed upwards of $10,000 to the partnership. The agreed business structure placed Franklin in command of sales in Natchez, with Armfield stationed more or less permanently at Alexandria in order to make purchases. Smith Franklin left Isaac's employment, although it is unknown if this was related to the formation of the partnership. Franklin & Armfield built a base of operations in Alexandria, D.C., where Franklin's elder brothers had previously worked as slave traders. The location was also chosen to avoid direct competition with rival slave trader Austin Woolfolk in Baltimore.

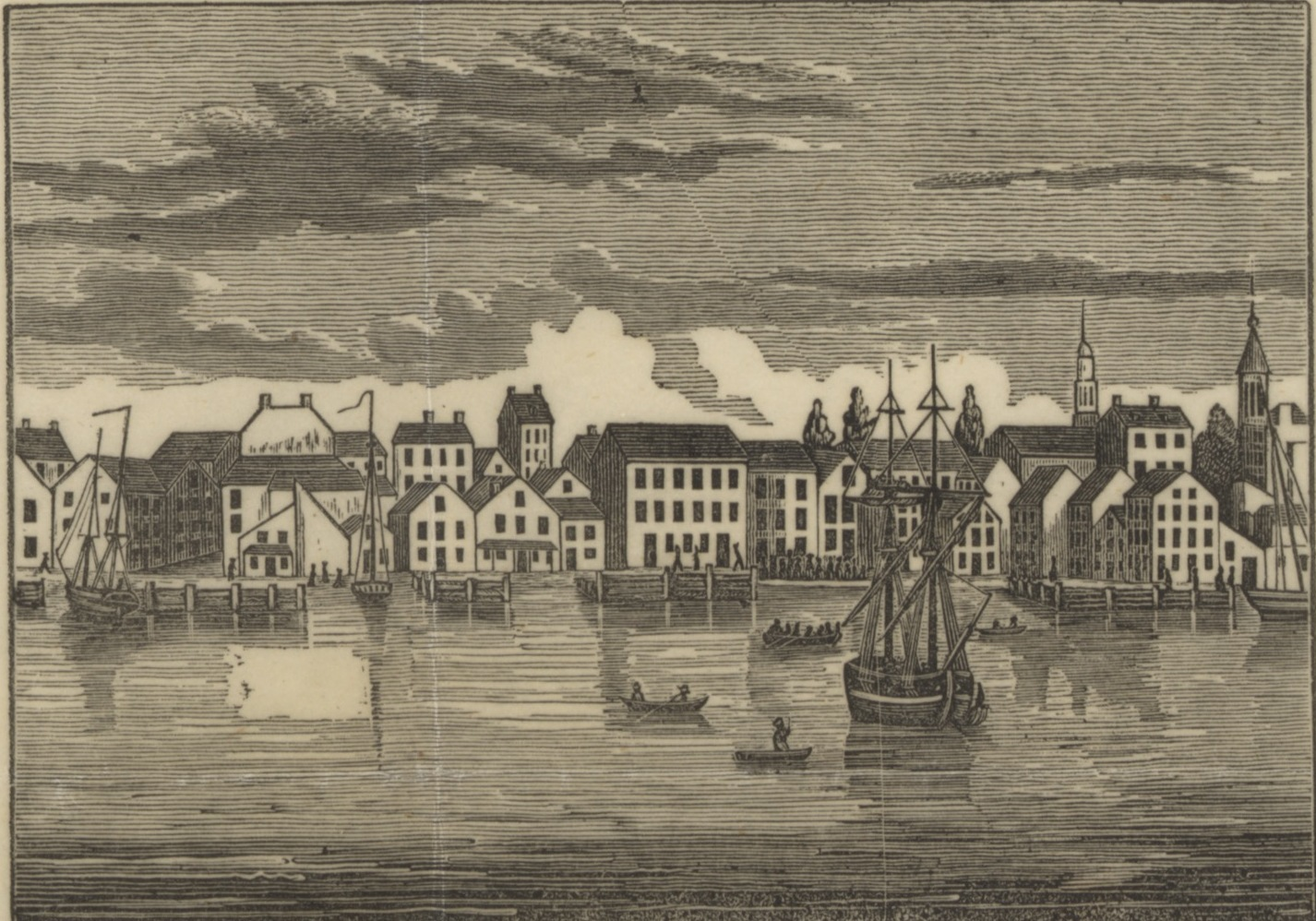
Slave ship entering port in Alexandria, Virginia

They began advertising to attract customers, running an advertisement in the Alexandria Gazette in May 1828, preceding others in the Alexandria Phenix Gazette and Washington United States' Telegraph. Such promotional material boasted of high prices paid and large volumes of slave purchases. In 1828, the firm leased (and later purchased) a large headquarters in the city, previously owned by Brigadier General Robert Young. The townhouse, three-stories high and attached to a large holding area, was described by an Alexandria tax inspector as "Franklin's black hole". In addition to its purpose as a holding pen, the building served as an office for the firm and a private residence for Armfield.

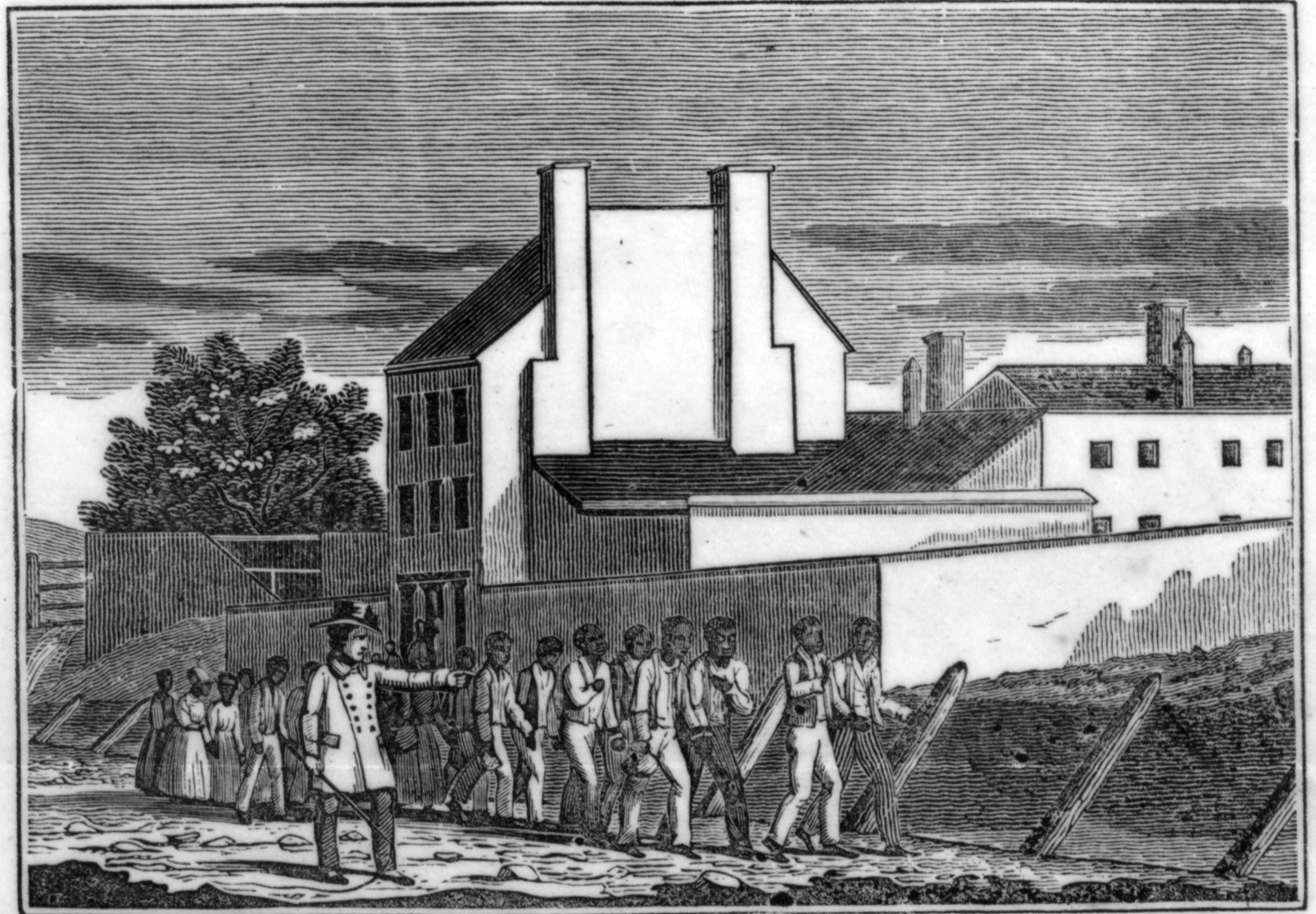
Franklin & Armfield headquarters, Alexandria. from a 1836 American Anti-Slavery Society broadside

Franklin & Armfield quickly achieved significant commercial success, and began to absorb or displace various local slave traders. The company employed large numbers of agents, smaller traders, clerks, and assistants in order to facilitate the large volume of enslaved people purchased and transported. Franklin employed two of his nephews, James Franklin Purvis and James Rawling Franklin, to work as purchasing agents for the company in northwestern Virginia and Maryland. James Rawling Franklin was later sent to conduct sales in the lower Mississippi. A number of regionally prominent traders in Virginia and Maryland were recruited as purchasing agents.

While Armfield and various contracted agents purchased slaves in Virginia, Franklin primarily managed the company's finances and shipments from his bases of operations in Natchez and New Orleans. In April 1829, following a local ban on slave trading in New Orleans, he leased a house and three vacant lots in the Faubourg Marigny, immediately outside of the city limits. The building served both as a residence and office for Franklin, with the vacant lots reserved as potential holding pens for the enslaved. The Louisiana State Legislature began to institute policies regulating certain aspects of the slave trade, including banning the sale of unaccompanied young children. Although Franklin largely ceased purchases of young children, he was able to buck the policy by lying about the children's age or claiming that they were orphans. Others were simply sold at Natchez or gifted to local politicians in order to curry favor, due to otherwise slim profits on children.

From his Faubourg Marigny office, Franklin sold large numbers of slaves, steadily shipped to the facility by Armfield and the firm's agents. Other slaves were shipped by steamboat to the facility in Natchez. From April to May 1829 in New Orleans alone, he sold 80 enslaved people, with another 75 sold in November and December of that year. A similar volume of sales was likely made at Natchez. The company's fortunes were reported by the abolitionist newspaper Genius of Universal Emancipation. In late 1829, Franklin encountered Jourdan Saunders, a relative newcomer to the slave trade based in Warrenton, Virginia. Franklin purchased seven slaves from Saunders, allowed him to live at his office, and hired him as a purchasing agent, expanding the company's geographical reach into northern Virginia and greatly profiting both parties.

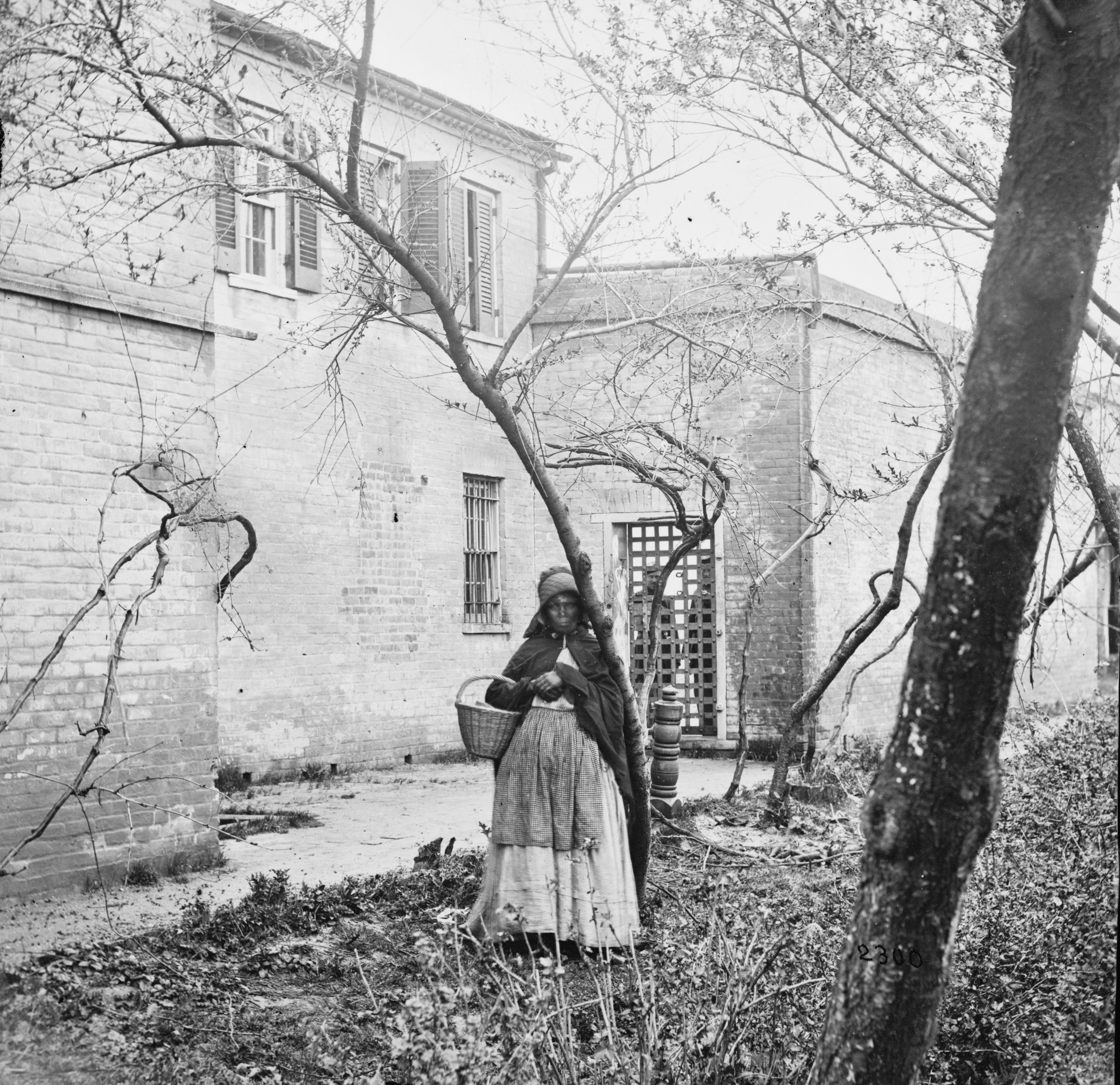
The former Franklin & Armfield headquarters, as seen in the late 1860s

=== Company expansion ===
Franklin & Armfield had their greatest commercial success from about 1830 to 1836. Historian Frederic Bancroft described the firm as "perhaps unequaled in all of the South" during this period. The success of the firm in Alexandria diverted much of Baltimore's slave trade, with slave exports in the city dropping by more than half over the 1830s.

Franklin's strategies within the slave trading industry have been described as shrewd and innovative. His preference for coastwise trade in lieu of overland coffles has been described as his most crucial innovation. Franklin & Armfield shipped the enslaved from the Chesapeake to the Lower Mississippi, reducing costs, travel time, and the chance of escape, as well as allowing large shipments of more than a hundred slaves at once. In order to offset the cost of shipping the enslaved from Alexandria to Virginia aboard commercial vessels, the company directly chartered a number of packet brigs, financed with shipping fees paid by other slave traders. Later, the company turned to commissioning slave ships outright, beginning with the Tribune in early 1831.

Another advantage enjoyed by Franklin was an ability to handle large amount of credit, promissory notes, and paper money, privately issued during the period. Planters generally purchased slaves with "long paper", which matured after 90 days. In order to transfer paper to the North, Franklin sent remittances to Alexandria in the form of various debt instruments purchased in New Orleans, usually in the form of bills owed by northern trading companies. Banknotes from Louisiana banks, even local branches of the Second Bank of the United States, were discounted by New York exchanges. Franklin was very skilled at managing the circulation of debt and paper. Economic expansion in the early 1830s allowed for a significantly greater influx of cash into the South, and planters were able to access expansive lines of credit used to purchase large numbers of slaves. Joshua Rothman described Franklin's operations to be "as much about acquiring sound money as it was about selling Black people".

==== Franklin, Ballard, & Co. ====
On March 15, 1831, following several months of informal business cooperation, Franklin & Armfield entered a co-partnership with fellow slave trader Rice Ballard's firm, Ballard & Alsop. Although mutually beneficial, the agreement placed significant restrictions on Ballard: Ballard & Alsop pledged to exclusively purchase and transport slaves to Franklin & Armfield, while the latter was not held to any trade restrictions. Ballard was considerably closer with the company than other agents, and while still legally distinct, the firms became mutually dependent operations. In New Orleans, the firms were united by a joint venture named Franklin, Ballard & Co. The agreement further broadened the company's reach of slave purchases into Fredericksburg and Richmond, Virginia, while also allowing them access to reliable and heavily capitalized banking networks of Virginia. The agreement legally bound Franklin to New Orleans from November to May—although these were generally his living arrangements already. He returned to his plantation in Tennessee during the summers. In late 1830, he had purchased over 400 acres of land in Sumner County, worked by his 77 slaves.

==== Sex trafficking ====
In addition to plantation slaves and house servants, Franklin & Armfield trafficked sex slaves, often referred to as "fancy maids" or "fancy girls". Mixed-race women, especially "nearly white" quadroons and octoroons were considered especially desirable for sexual slavery, selling for prices four to five times that of field laborers. Exceptionally light-skinned sex slaves were valued by planters, and referred to as white when sold by Franklin. Sex slaves were traded between members of the firm for their use, including between Isaac Franklin and his nephew James. James Franklin reported that Isaac engaged nightly in "very boyish behavior", sexually abusing women in his possession.

The fancy girl, from Charlattsvilla [Charlottesville], will you send her out or shall I charge you $1100 for her. Say quick, I wanted to see her ... I thought that an old Robber might be satisfied with two or three maids.

— Isaac Franklin, letter to Rice Ballard, January 1834

Franklin was "focused on" a sex slave named Lucinda Jackson or "Lucindy" after purchasing her at a company discount in 1834, impregnating her shortly before his marriage. Franklin quickly sold her to a friend in Louisville in order to avoid scandal. Franklin took a dim view on romantic relationships with slaves, mocking Ballard for freeing two enslaved women he had children with.

==== Bypass of trade restrictions ====
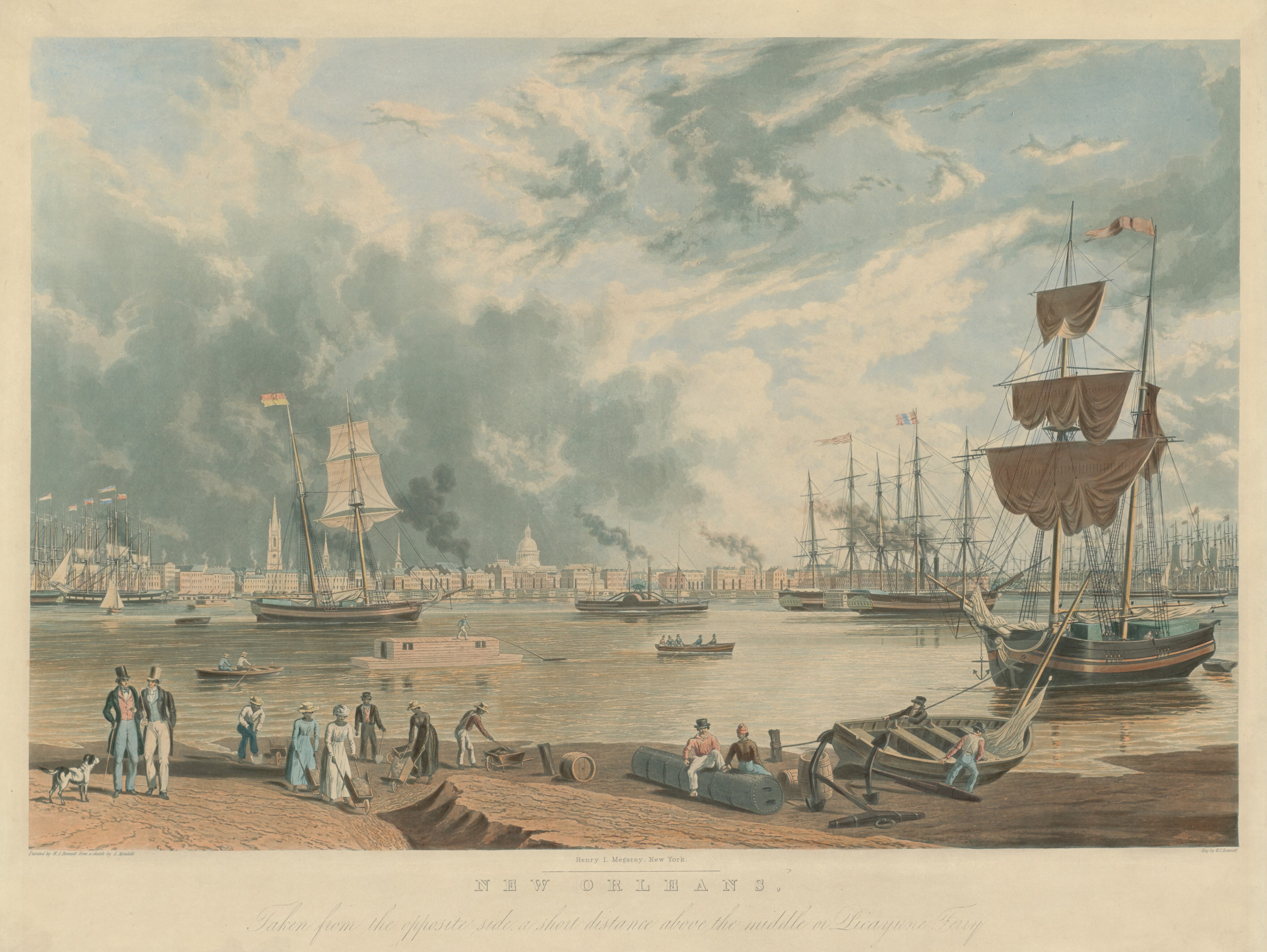
Port of New Orleans, 1841

In August 1831, Nat Turner's slave rebellion broke out in southern Virginia. Although the uprising was quickly crushed, the large number of whites killed by the rebels led to widespread fear of future rebellion, and a wave of legislation targeting the slave trade. Franklin, who by September 1831 was preparing to receive several large shipments totaling around 400 people, had grown increasingly worried about the prospects of a slave trading ban in Louisiana even before the rebellion.

Louisiana passed an official ban on slave imports by nonresidents on November 19, 1831. Isaac and James Franklin sold a large number of slaves in the weeks prior to its ban taking effect, selling 240 people in the month between the ban's passage and implementation. The rapid speed of Franklin's slave sales was enabled by extending generous lines of credit: over 40% of Franklin's sales in late 1831 were made on credit. Such credit was often on shaky foundations: buyers frequently withheld payment for months or years, and occasionally backed purchases with unendorsed promissory notes financed purely from mortgages on the enslaved. Franklin unsuccessfully petitioned to change his main address to New Orleans in order to continue trading.

A final shipment of 182 slaves aboard the Tribune was en route to New Orleans during this period. While the legislation allowed a 12-day window of continued slave shipments to Louisiana, it required the slaves to be taken outside of the state within five days to prevent a "last-minute influx of slaves". Franklin intended to sell slaves to buyers from an invoice mailed to New Orleans, and forge receipts to claim such sales were made in Virginia. Following mailing delays, the slaves were instead sold upriver at Natchez. The scheme was put into play again, formalized in an Alexandria "council of war" organized by Armfield, Ballard, and various local agents.

Franklin was prevented from simply selling to Louisiana planters in Mississippi, as the law had also banned imports of slaves by residents from neighboring states. Instead, slaves would be shown to interested buyers in New Orleans, before being shipped upriver to the Natchez facility. There, the company forged documents to imply the slaves were instead purchased in Memphis, Tennessee, bypassing any restrictions in Louisiana. In December 1831, Franklin was sued by Auguste Rieffel, the owner of a New Orleans livery stable, after he failed to provide Rieffel a cut of sales promised in exchange for directing interested buyers to him. Summoned to the parish court, Franklin flatly denied the allegations, and his continued fraudulent trade remained undiscovered. The Louisiana State Legislature furthered restrictions in April 1832 to prohibit slave imports from Kentucky, Tennessee, and Missouri, closing the loophole. The company abandoned further efforts of fraudulent trade in Louisiana, shifting its primary sales operations in the deep south to Natchez. Although speculation over an expanding cotton industry led to many buyers in Natchez, they were unable to pay even their interest in cash, often making purchases in the form of the accommodation paper of city merchants.

=== Financial difficulties and retirement ===
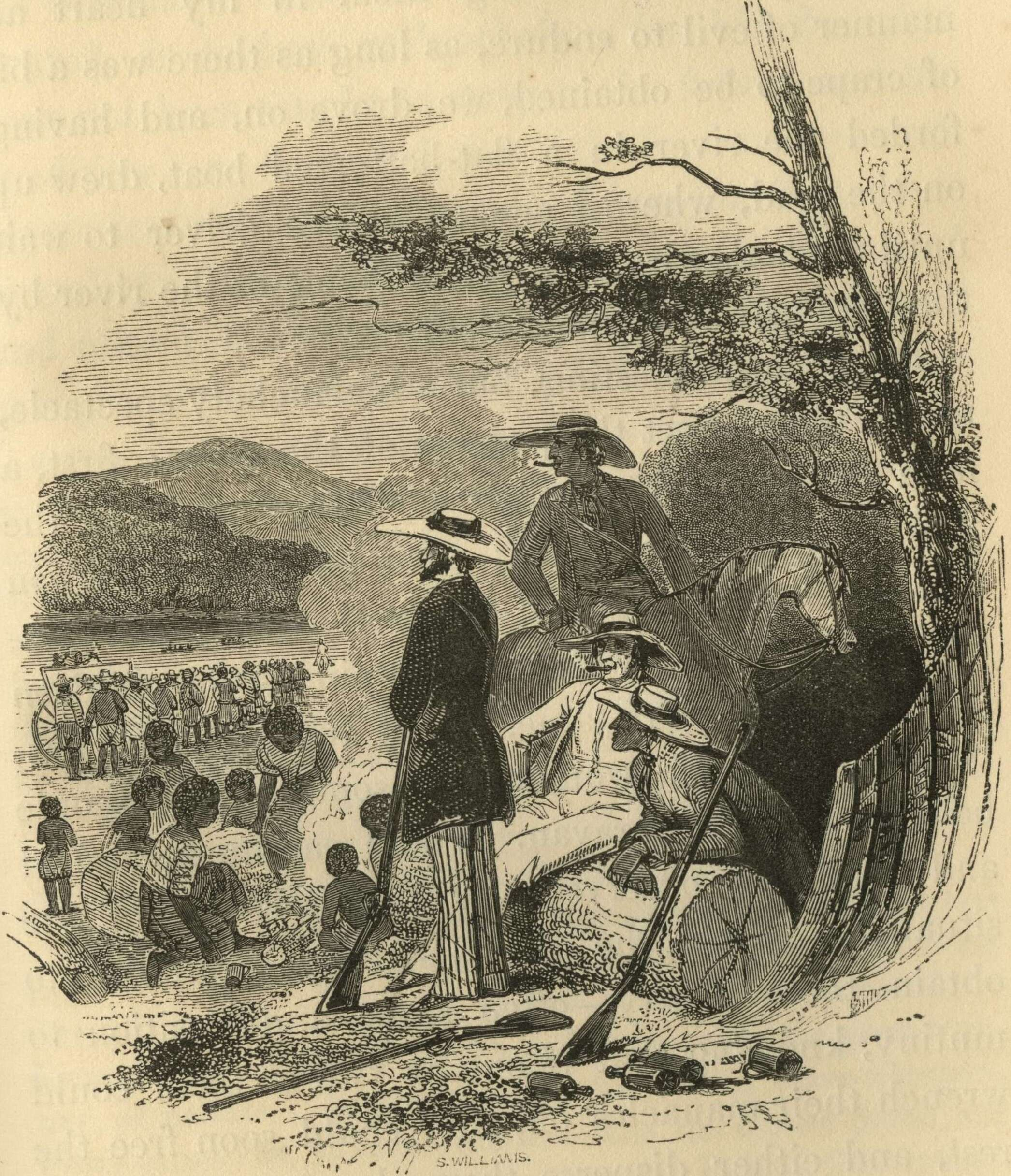
John Armfield and agents overseeing a slave coffle, as seen by George Featherstonhaugh, 1834

Early 1832 was a particularly difficult period for the company, and Franklin directed Ballard to borrow from northern banks in order to maintain cash flow until buyers in New Orleans were able to repay their debts. The firm briefly halted slave shipments due to legislative restrictions and the freezing of the Potomac River. Franklin considered retirement, and transferred many business responsibilities (including power of attorney) to James Franklin. He also began to spend significant effort to improve his land holdings in Tennessee. The previous September, he had purchased over 900 acres of land in Sumner County, and on it built a sizeable plantation named Fairvue. Armfield and Ballard attempted to purchase larger numbers of slaves in order to repay debts, but Franklin reported that sales at Natchez were "very dull". By June 1832, he was able to sell almost all slaves, but sales prices had greatly decreased, and he was only able to send north a fraction of what had been spent on slave purchases. Only generous loans given to planters by regional banks prevented a further decline in sales. In order to maintain income, Franklin ordered Armfield & Ballard to reverse course and sell slaves in Chesapeake, and put company brigs on transatlantic freight routes. Political struggles over the rechartering of the Second Bank of the United States further destabilized markets, and Franklin was unable to collect on bills until fall.

==== Cholera outbreak ====
Conditions continued to deteriorate for the company. The new Constitution of Mississippi included a clause outlawing the interstate slave trade, threatening to evict Franklin from Natchez if enforced. Additionally, a large cholera pandemic had crossed the Atlantic in 1832. Trafficked slaves, generally in poor health and kept in cramped conditions, were especially at risk of the disease. A Virginia coffle brought to Fairvue by James Franklin in October 1832 was struck by the disease: two or three people died of cholera while en route to Tennessee, with three more dying upon reaching Fairvue. Franklin caught up to the coffle south of Nashville, by which time many other slaves had died. Franklin had the group camp outside of Natchez for several weeks to avoid spreading the disease into the city, finally entering the city in late November.

At Franklin's Natchez compound, the survivors were joined by over a hundred slaves shipped south by Armfield. Massive numbers of the enslaved died from the disease, leading Franklin to throw the corpses into nearby creeks and gullies and partially bury them. He wrote in humor to Ballard that "the way we send out dead Negroes at night and keep dark is a sin to Crocket". Franklin also expressed irritation at Armfield's large and expensive shipment, describing the survivors as "little slim assed girls and boys" who "cannot be sold for a profit". Rainfall in April 1833 revealed the decomposing body of a teenage girl. A coroner investigation unearthed two more bodies buried nearby, including an eight-month-old infant buried head-down, "hid from view by a few shovels full of dirt". Further dead unearthed were wearing standardized clothing used by Franklin & Armfield, directly implicating Franklin. Franklin blamed the burials on his hired overseer, Samuel Johnson, who had died of cholera the previous week.

This led to widespread shock, outrage, and condemnation among the white population of Natchez. Within two days, a petition circulated demanding the expulsion of slave traders, signed even by Franklin's rival traders. Public pressure led to an emergency city council meeting banning the practice. He sold his property in the city and moved operations a mile east to what would become the Forks of the Road slave market. This soon became a cluster of buildings housing various slave traders operations, referred to derisively as "Niggerville".

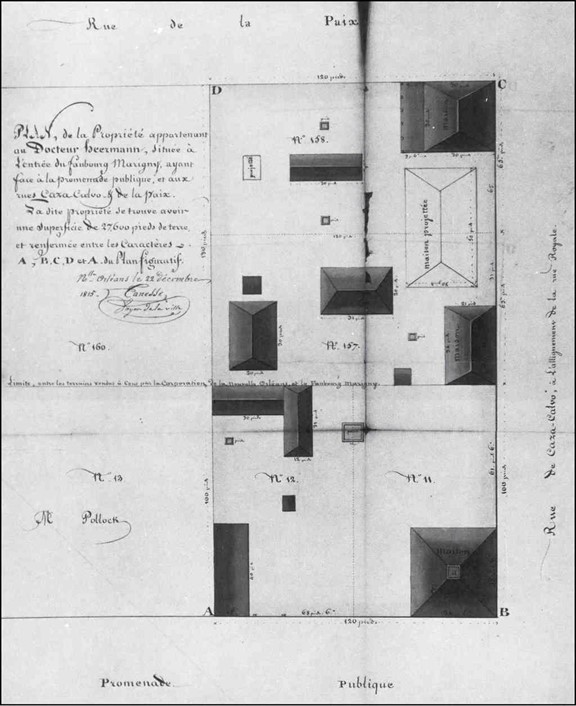
1815 diagram of what would become Isaac Franklin's second compound in Faubourg Marigny, New Orleans

==== Recovery ====
Franklin was able to resume sales as the pandemic lifted, writing to Ballard that sales had "been at fare prices" and that he "will not give up the ship". By January 1833, Franklin had gained access to the newly founded Union Bank of Louisiana, a heavily capitalized bank which allowed him to convert much of his held debt into usable cash. The stabilization of sales and the new influx of money into the company postponed his plans to end the partnership with Armfield and Ballard. Louisiana had also loosened previous trade restrictions, allowing for the potential to reopen operations in New Orleans. Armfield resumed regular shipments to Franklin, with well over three hundred slaves sent to Natchez aboard the Lafayette and Tribune in early 1833. Franklin & Armfield contracted three additional purchasing agents in Maryland and Virginia.

The late spring of 1833 saw a resurgence of cholera. Business typically slowed during the season, but it became impossible to sell the enslaved during the epidemic. Franklin wrote to Ballard that he hoped "all the fools are not yet dead & some one eyed man will buy us out." Franklin returned to Fairvue without selling his remaining slaves at Natchez. Better economic conditions later in the year allowed Franklin to raise prices for slaves by 40–50% in October. Franklin began preparing to retire from the business, promoting his nephews James Franklin and James Purvis to company partners. He cautioned Ballard against further partnership expansion, due to economic worries related to lowering international cotton prices and increased competition in the lower Mississippi. The Louisiana legislature rescinded the ban on slave imports in late 1833, leading Franklin to rent a new property in New Orleans, two blocks away from his former compound in Faubourg Marigny. Although the company was able to continue selling slaves at high rates, many died from cholera, neutralizing any profits. Franklin, without another partner at the Forks of the Road, both managed imports and delivered the enslaved to Natchez itself. He became increasingly depressed with business.

I have had a Desperate season [...] I am almost Broke down. [...] After this, you all must dispence with my servises its two bad to kill the old fellow after sustaining you all under so many Disadvantages. I have made a slave of myself, for the benefits of others.

— Isaac Franklin, letter to Rice Ballard, December 1833

The company was largely unable to find buyers in New Orleans, and slave prices had greatly declined. Franklin believed that snowfall and freezing rain created the possibility of a sugarcane crop failure, resulting in a slave supply glut due to mass sales by planters seeking to recuperate their losses. He ordered Ballard to lower purchase volume, and refocused the company towards collecting outstanding bills, intending to sell slaves on long-term credit when markets improved. He was able to sell just over a hundred slaves in New Orleans from January to May 1834, one third of what was sold three years prior. Other slaves were sold to the Louisiana Board of Public Works and various cotton planters in the north of the state, mainly on credit for low prices. Ballard failed to vaccinate many of the enslaved from smallpox, leading to outbreaks in Louisiana. The resulting deaths of many enslaved people greatly annoyed Franklin, due to financial losses and negative publicity for the company.

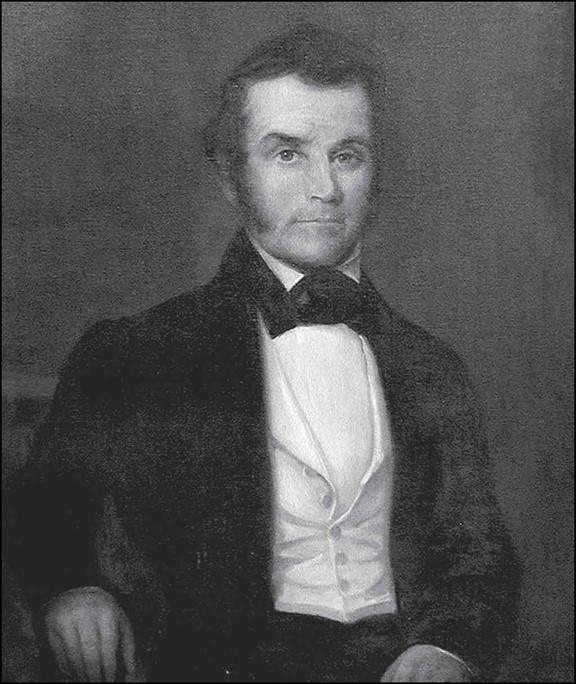
Portrait of Franklin by Washington Bogart Cooper, mid-1830s

Economic conditions in the South worsened, but recovered by late spring after the lifting of lending restrictions. Franklin was able to cash debt owed, resume cash sales in New Orleans, and continue shipments of purchased slaves from the Chesapeake. However, the sudden death of James Franklin that year left the future succession of the firm unclear. Although sales in New Orleans (previously managed by James Franklin) largely ceased, large-scale purchases and shipments of the enslaved to the Natchez continued. Joseph Holt Ingraham, describing Franklin in the mid-1830s, named him "the great southern slave-merchant", praising him for his "gentlemanly address".

==== Retirement from trading ====
The company began to wind down some operations, discontinuing many of its partnerships. In April 1835, Franklin transferred power of attorney over his remaining New Orleans operations to the N & J Dick and Company merchant firm. The Franklin, Ballard, & Co. agreement was altered and renewed in July, giving Franklin a full share of profits under official retirement, with him having "no duties whatever assigned him except what he chooses voluntarily to render". A third slave ship, named the Isaac Franklin in his honor, was commissioned. Purpose-built for carrying slaves, it was longer and narrower than previous vessels. It notably featured a "man bust head", a carving of Franklin's head and torso attached to the ship's prow. Although Franklin offered advice, and still occasionally engaged in slave trading, he mainly retired from the firm in favor of managing his properties in Louisiana and Tennessee.

The firm's shipping operations continued, transporting over 1,500 enslaved people aboard the three brigs. In November 1836, the Isaac Franklin shipped the company's final and largest shipment, with 254 enslaved people shipped from Alexandria to New Orleans, including one who died on board. The company sold the Isaac Franklin and their Alexandria offices to agent George Kephart, while renting the Forks of the Road facility to other slave traders. The Panic of 1837 began shortly after, destroying credit markets, and the company largely ceased slave trading.

Franklin continued pursuing debts owed by slaveholders for several years afterwards through various means. His debtors occasionally paid interest in kind with bales of cotton, although the recession destabilized cotton prices, and merchant firms were frequently unable to pay with reliable paper. Some holders mortgaged slaves or land as security on their loans. Between 1837 and 1838, Franklin, Armfield, & Ballard filed almost a dozen cases against various debtors (including customers, endorsers, and merchants) in Adams County alone. Judgements typically came in the partnership's favor, leading to foreclosures and auctioning of land and slaves. These were often purchased by the partners themselves and sold at an additional profit. The partnership was officially dissolved on November 10, 1841, although all three continued giving advice to former partners in the business.

=== Henderson affair ===
Madison Henderson, a runaway slave convicted of murder during an attempted bank robbery, offered a lurid account of Franklin's operations while on death row in 1841 and was interviewed by local press. Henderson claimed that he had served as Franklin's personal servant and trained as a thief, tasked with manipulating slaves into entering Franklin's control through various forms of fraud and deceit. One story given involved Franklin, after earning the good favor of senator Henry Clay at a White House dinner, selling him Henderson, who then ran away and rejoined Franklin the following week. Although many details of the story were likely exaggerated or fabricated, it was broadly circulated in popular press. The Mississippi Free Trader published a column defending Franklin and denouncing the story, featuring comments from Clay and Andrew Jackson disputing Henderson's claims and reaffirming Franklin's character.

== Planting ==
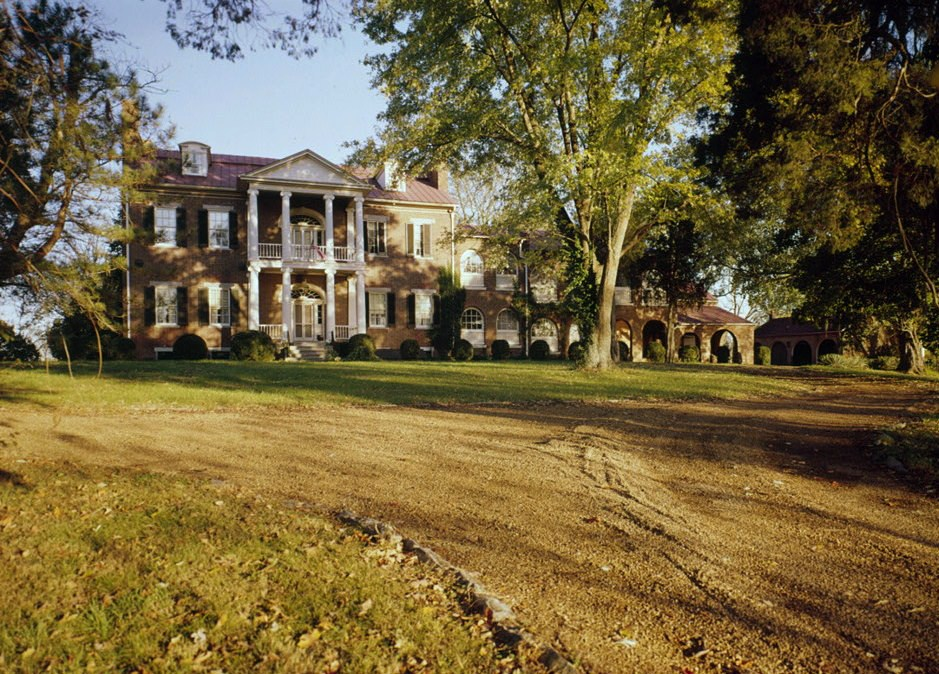
Franklin's Fairvue Plantation, as seen in 1971

Franklin's Fairvue plantation served as his primary residence. A complex of 15–20 brick slave houses was erected on the property in a configuration resembling a town. The residences were constructed alongside barns, stables, a springhouse, carriage house, gristmill, cotton gin, privy, icehouse, outbuilding kitchen, and shops for a resident blacksmith and carpenter. The central building was a lavishly furnished two-story mansion, built in typical regional plantation architecture. By 1840, 117 enslaved people were held on the property. The slave population steadily grew, prompting Franklin to build more slave housing.

In May 1835, Franklin purchased a half-stake in a 7,767-acre (3,143 ha) property (alongside 205 enslaved people) in West Feliciana Parish, Louisiana, divided among the three plantations of Bellevue, Killarney, and Lochlomond. The co-owner, Francis Routh, had accumulated large debts expanding his property in the parish. In exchange for a large cash payment, Franklin received a coequal share of the plantations' profit without needing to administrate or manage the properties. Franklin lambasted Routh's management and finances, describing him as incompetent. Routh failed to pay land taxes for a number of years, with debts compounded by large number of mortgages and court judgements against him. The sheriff of West Feliciana Parish began seizing portions of his cotton crop, eventually seizing his entire property by January 1838. Franklin purchased all of Routh's property at auction. Routh and his family refused to leave the plantation, even after accepting offers of slaves, money, and farm animals in exchange, leading Franklin to evict them in late 1838.

After consolidating ownership over the property, Franklin purchased great numbers of enslaved people, doubling the number held while under joint ownership with Routh. The total slave population of his holdings approached 500. He carved three additional plantations out of a wide swath of his undeveloped land, naming them Panola (after a Choctaw word for cotton), Loango, and Angola. Although the Loango and Angola plantations were named after regions in Africa, it is unlikely any of his slaves were from these regions.

Franklin steadily developed his six West Feliciana plantations. As over a hundred slaves worked to clear dense swampy forest on his Angola plantation, he installed a steam-powered sawmill in order to sell lumber and timber. A persistent community of white squatters at Angola were eventually bribed to leave. He built extensive housing, cisterns, and storehouses on his plantations, alongside a levee along a nearby bayou. In addition to the primary agricultural products of cotton and corn, he farmed cows, pigs, and sheep on the plantations. He also sold Spanish moss collected from trees. Sickness and poor health was endemic among the plantations' slaves, leading Franklin to construct a hospital and incur large medical bills. Runaways were a common occurrence. Although reporting great pride in his estate, Franklin frequently expressed a desire to sell his Louisiana plantation in order to remain at Fairvue, a desire increased by his declining health. He unsuccessfully attempted to sell the properties to Armfield following a reunion in 1844. By the time of his death in 1846, he owned 636 enslaved people.

== Personal life and death ==
Adelicia Acklen, Franklin's widow, c. 1850

Franklin began a relationship with Adelicia Hayes, nearly thirty years his junior, the daughter of a wealthy Tennessee planter and minister. On July 2, 1839, Franklin married Hayes at her family's Rokeby Plantation. Their first daughter, Victoria, was born in 1840, followed by Adelicia in 1842. A son, Julius Caesar, was born in January 1844, but died less than a day after birth. Their youngest daughter, Emma, was born the following year.

=== Death and estate ===
Various health issues, especially stomach problems, plagued Franklin later in life. In late April 1846, he fell gravely ill, and summoned Armfield and a family doctor to the property, dying shortly before their arrival. He was pronounced dead from "congestion of the stomach" at his Bellevue plantation on April 27. Armfield purchased a coffin and preserved Franklin in three barrels of whiskey. Accompanied by Adelicia and their daughters, his body was transported by steamboat and wagon to Fairvue, where it was buried by a slave crew. In his will, he ordered the construction of a mausoleum for himself and his family at Fairvue. Adelicia was willed Fairvue, under the stipulation she never remarried; if she did, the property would revert to his estate and she would instead receive a cash inheritance. He also set aside a portion of his estate for the purchase of 190 slaves for his West Feliciana properties, housed by the construction of three additional "clusters of houses". Armfield spent several years executing Franklin's estate, including some management of his plantations.

== Legacy ==
Although he considered striking any philanthropic inheritance from his will shortly before death, a third of his wealth was set aside for the creation of an academy on the grounds of Fairvue, as well as for the education of poor children in Sumner County. Although the Tennessee General Assembly incorporated the "Isaac Franklin Institute", it was never constructed, and none of Franklin's estate ultimately went towards public education. Franklin's intended philanthropy prompted praise from various newspapers across the country. New-York Tribune editor Horace Greeley published a favorable eulogy of Franklin, later retracting it upon realizing his past as a slave trader. Various papers commemorated Franklin, describing his career and past in highly euphemistic terms. A eulogy in the Daily Delta merely described his "peculiar calling" as bringing him his wealth. Eulogies of Franklin were lavish and elaborate, describing him as a "worthy Christian", and an equal to the "[heroes] of early Greece and Rome".

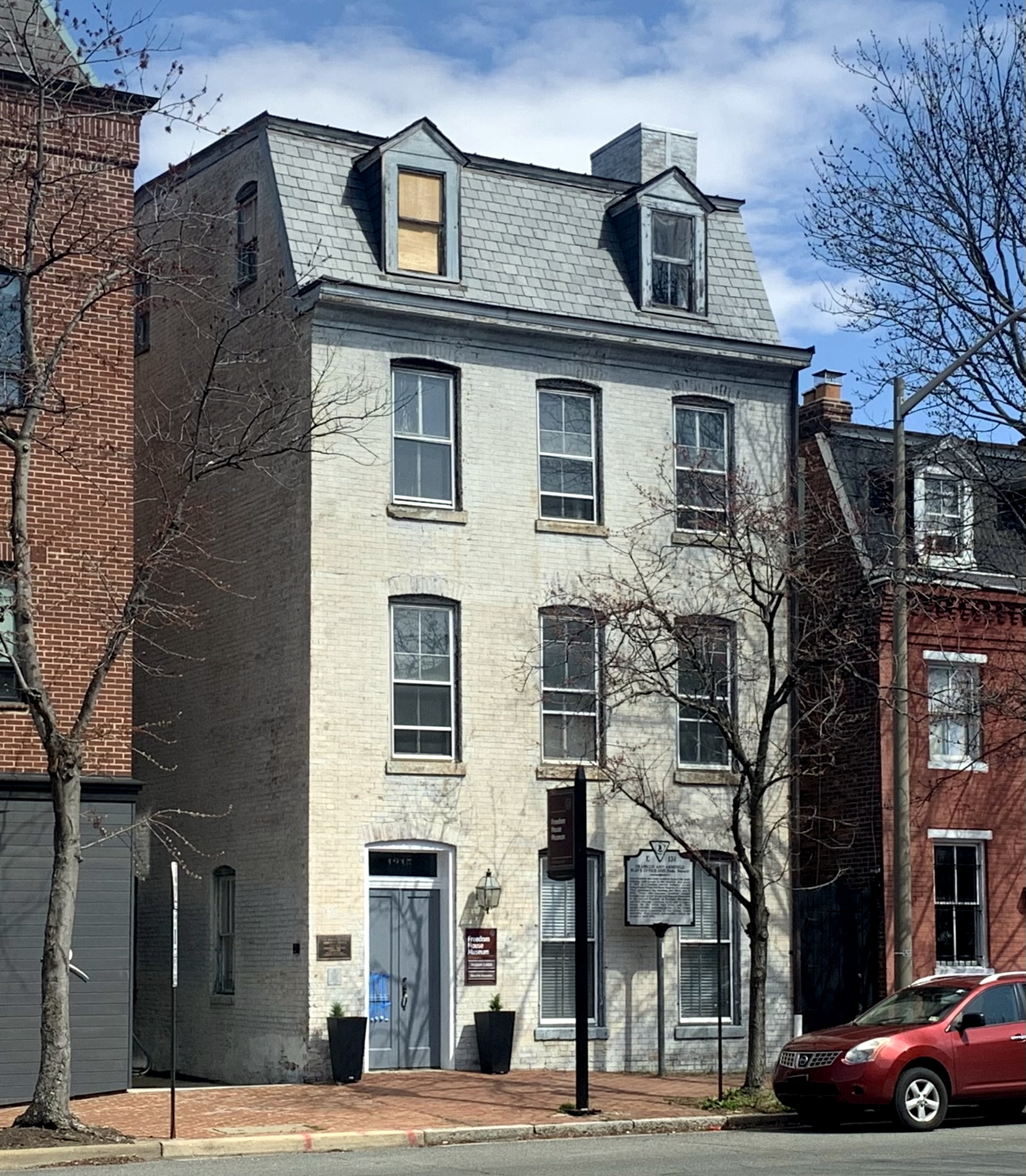
Former Franklin & Armfield office, now Freedom House Museum, 2022
