= Beersheba Springs, Tennessee =

- Town
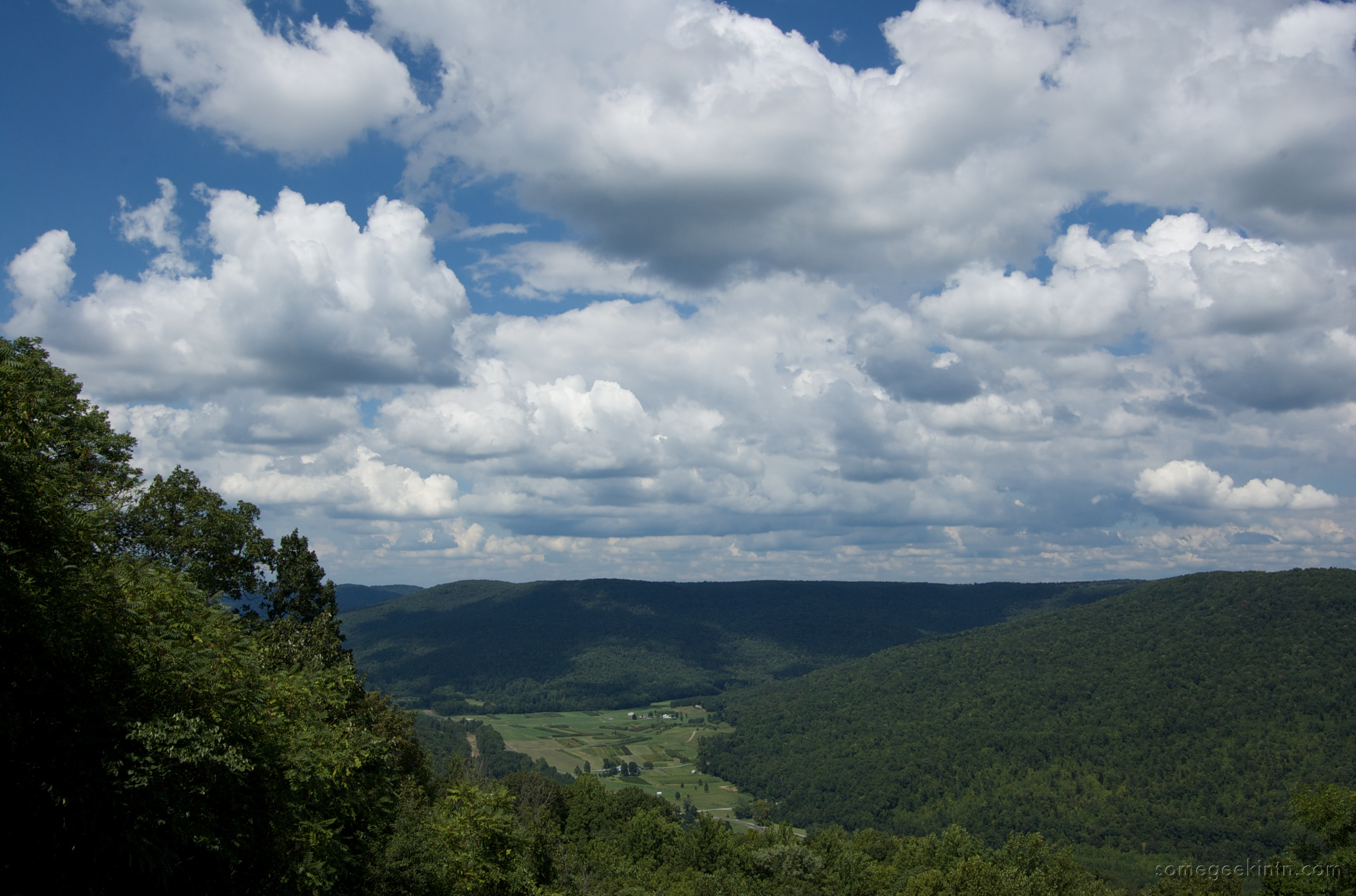
- A view of Tarlton Valley from Beersheba Springs

- Location of Beersheba Springs in Grundy County, Tennessee.
- Coordinates: 35°28′2″N 85°40′18″W
- Country: United States
- State: Tennessee
- County: Grundy
- Incorporated: 1835

Area
  - Total: 4.80 sq mi (12.43 km^{2})
  - Land: 4.80 sq mi (12.43 km^{2})
  - Water: 0 sq mi (0.00 km^{2})
- Elevation: 1,850 ft (560 m)

Population (2020)
  - Total: 434
  - Density: 90.4/sq mi (34.92/km^{2})
- Time zone: UTC-6 (Central (CST))
  - Summer (DST): UTC-5 (CDT)
- ZIP code: 37305
- Area code: 931
- FIPS code: 47-04240
- GNIS feature ID: 1305073

Beersheba Springs (/ˈbɜːrʃəbə/) is a town in Grundy County, Tennessee, United States, in the south central part of the state. As of the 2020 census, Beersheba Springs had a population of 434. A prominent resort town in the 19th century, Beersheba Springs was developed in 1854 by retired wealthy slave trader, John Armfield, who bought property in the area. It became a destination for wealthy guests from Nashville and other cities.

Tennessee author Mary Noailles Murfree later regularly stayed at the complex in the summer. The town now serves as a major summer meeting center for the Tennessee United Methodist Church.

== History ==
In 1833 Beersheba Porter Cain discovered a chalybeate spring. The spring and surrounding area, located above Collins River Valley, were incorporated in 1839. Upon its incorporation, Beersheba Springs was developed as a summer rural resort with a small hotel and log cabins. It was notable for its mineral waters, which were thought to have health-giving properties. The resort would be popular with stagecoach traffic that would travel between Chattanooga and McMinnville.

Eventually Louisiana planters also moved into the area, leaving behind the notoriously hot and humid summers of their home state. Beersheba Springs served as the summer home for Tennessee author Mary Noailles Murfree.

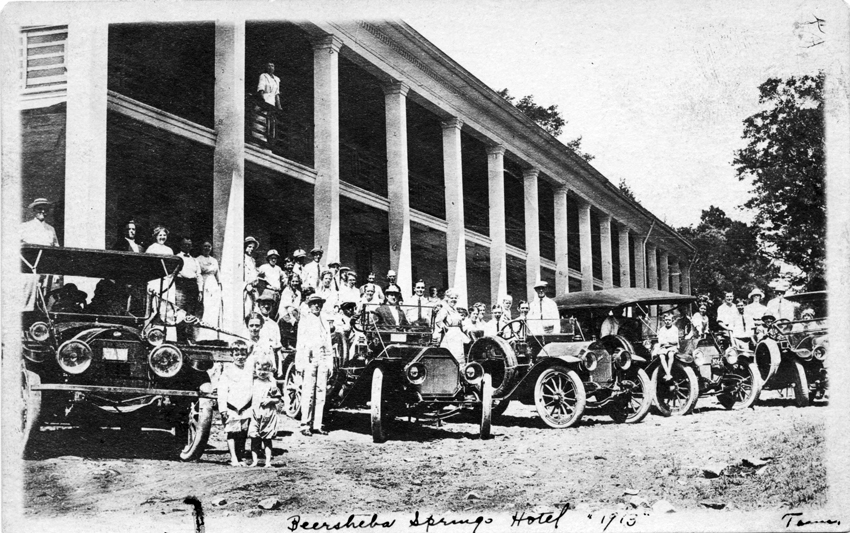
Beersheba Springs Hotel, 1913

=== Beersheba Springs resort ===
In 1854 Colonel John Armfield, a planter and former slave trader based in Alexandria, Virginia and New Orleans, Louisiana, acquired the property. He transported upwards of 100 slaves to Beersheba Springs to develop the property as a resort destination with a new luxury hotel, cabins and grounds to accommodate 400 guests. The resort also featured laundry facilities, ice houses, billiard rooms, and bowling alleys. French chefs were brought in to serve guests, as were musical acts from New Orleans.

Enslaved African Americans built a wooden observatory at the front of the hotel. From the observatory, white guests could watch Confederate and Union armies battle during the Civil War. Eventually the threat of war, raids, and plundering caused a decline in visitors to Beersheba Springs. It was sold to Northern investors.

The resort re-opened in the 1870s during the Reconstruction era, but it never returned to its former glory. In 1940, the Methodist Church purchased the resort and re-opened it for assembly and summer camps.

Architecturally the resort remains largely unchanged, although in the late 20th century, parts of the hotel were "modernized" or restored. The camp now serves as the site of the annual Beersheba Springs Arts and Craft Fair. It is still a site for Methodist Church assemblies and summer camps.

In 1980 the resort area was placed on the National Register of Historic Places.

== Geography ==
Beersheba Springs is located at 35°28′2″N 85°40′18″W (35.467209, -85.671700). According to the United States Census Bureau, the town has a total area of 4.9 square miles (13 km^{2}), all land.

== Demographics ==
Historical population
Census	Pop.	Note	%±
1880	138		—
1960	577		—
1970	560		−2.9%
1980	643		14.8%
1990	596		−7.3%
2000	553		−7.2%
2010	477		−13.7%
2020	434		−9.0%

=== 2020 census ===
Beersheba Springs racial composition
Race	Number	Percentage
White (non-Hispanic)	397	91.47%
Black or African American (non-Hispanic)	1	0.23%
Native American	2	0.46%
Other/Mixed	27	6.22%
Hispanic or Latino	7	1.61%

As of the 2020 United States census, there were 434 people, 198 households, and 144 families residing in the town.

=== 2000 census ===
As of the census of 2000, there were 553 people, 232 households, and 168 families residing in the town. The population density was 112.6 inhabitants per square mile (43.5/km^{2}). There were 304 housing units at an average density of 61.9 per square mile (23.9/km^{2}). The racial makeup of the town was 99.82% White, and 0.18% from two or more races. Hispanic or Latino of any race were 0.54% of the population.

There were 232 households, out of which 28.0% had children under the age of 18 living with them, 59.5% were married couples living together, 10.8% had a female householder with no husband present, and 27.2% were non-families. 23.7% of all households were made up of individuals, and 9.5% had someone living alone who was 65 years of age or older. The average household size was 2.38 and the average family size was 2.82.

In the town, the population was spread out, with 21.7% under the age of 18, 7.2% from 18 to 24, 26.0% from 25 to 44, 26.8% from 45 to 64, and 18.3% who were 65 years of age or older. The median age was 42 years. For every 100 females, there were 94.0 males. For every 100 females age 18 and over, there were 95.0 males.

The median income for a household in the town was $22,045, and the median income for a family was $26,250. Males had a median income of $27,083 versus $20,000 for females. The per capita income for the town was $13,691. About 26.9% of families and 32.5% of the population were below the poverty line, including 38.8% of those under age 18 and 26.4% of those age 65 or over.

== Beersheba Springs today ==
The former resort serves as a retreat for the Tennessee branch of the United Methodist Church and the Arts and Craft festival. The Old Brown Museum, a former country store, now serves as a community museum documenting the history of Beersheba Springs. The town, with a population of 477, is the home to seven churches.
