= Isaac Franklin (brig) =

American slave ship (1830s)

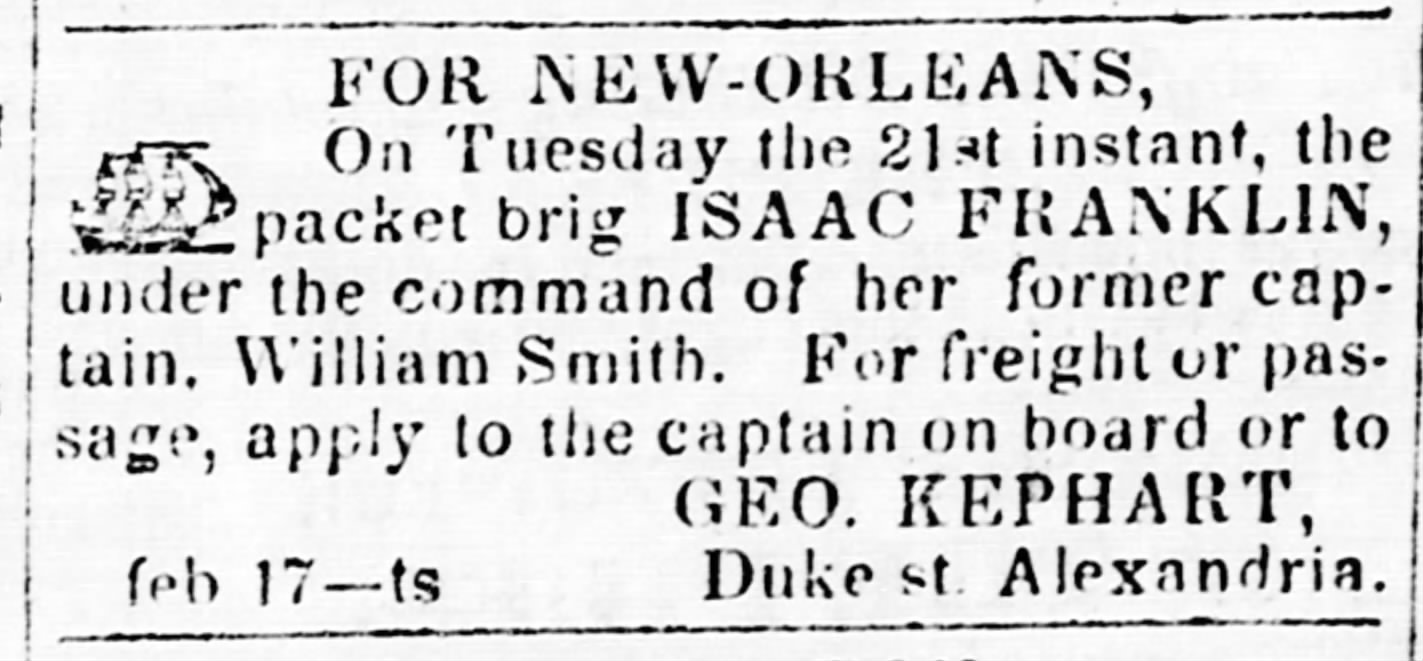
"For New-Orleans" Alexandria Gazette, February 18, 1837

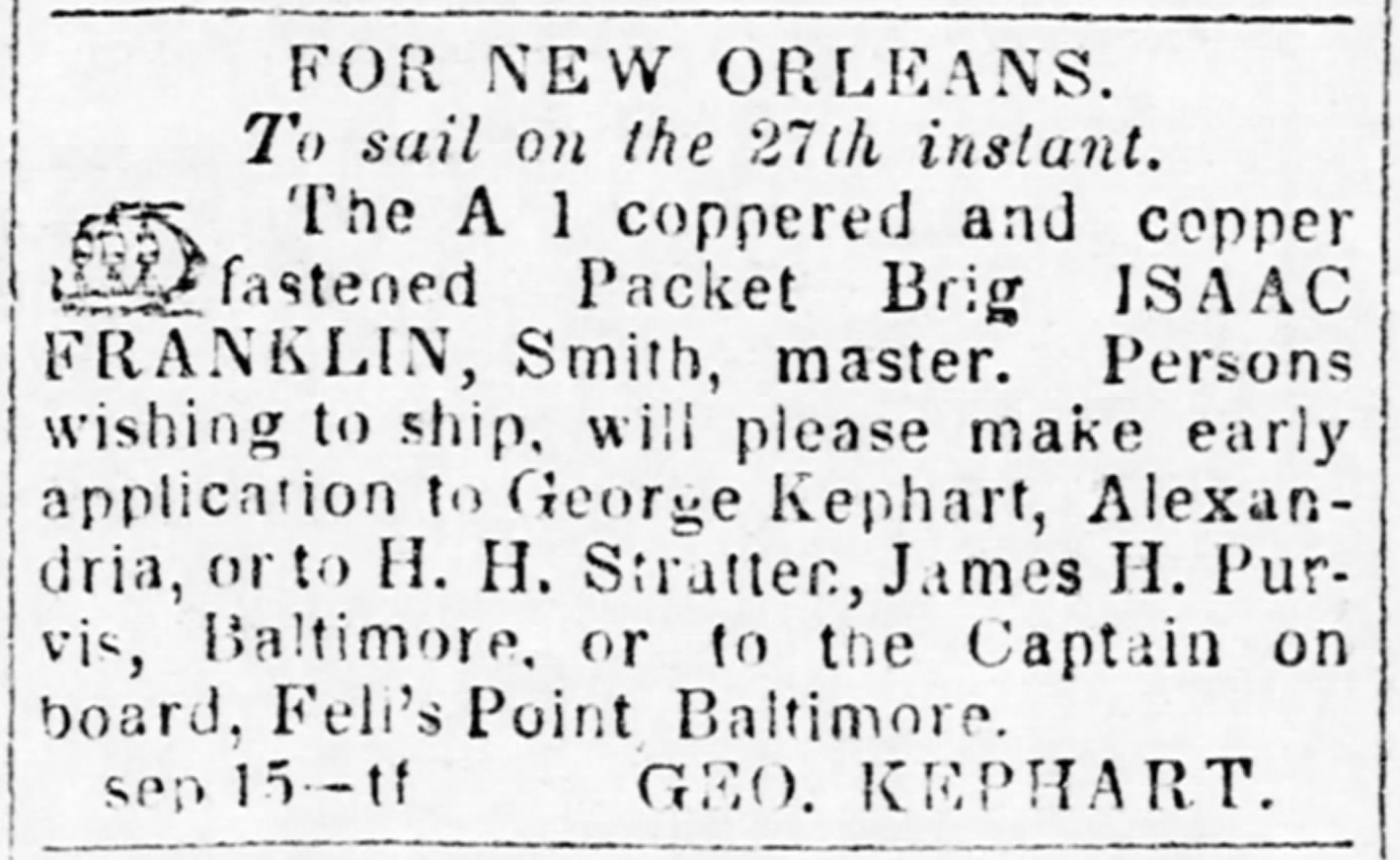
"To sail on the 27th instant." Alexandria Gazette, September 18, 1838

The Isaac Franklin was an American coastwise slave ship operated in the 1830s that was initially owned by and named for slave trader Isaac Franklin. Isaac Franklin was a steam-powered brig with one deck, two masts, and a square stern, measuring 189 8/95 tons. She was described in one advertisement as "coppered [and] copper-fastened." A manifest from 1837, held at the New-York Historical Society, lists Lawrence Millaudon, a sugar planter, and George Lane, as the consignees of a shipment of 73 enslaved people sailing from Alexandria, District of Columbia, to New Orleans on the brig Isaac Franklin. Isaac Franklin was sold to slave trader George Kephart of Alexandria around 1837; her sister ships Uncas and Tribune were sold to slave trader William H. Williams of Washington City, District of Columbia. One of the later owners of Uncas was Brazilian slave trader Manuel Pinto da Fonseca.
