= Uncas (brig) =

American and Brazilian slave ship

Uncas was one of three brigs used as slave ships that were owned by the American slave-trading firm Franklin & Armfield. Uncas was built in Connecticut in 1833 and weighed 155 tons. The two-masted brig cost US$7,250 (equivalent to $236,225 in 2024).

She was a packet-style coastwise transport between Alexandria, Virginia and New Orleans, Louisiana. Her sisters were Isaac Franklin and Tribune. Rice Ballard owned one-third of Uncas.

As of approximately 1836, the master of Uncas was Nathaniel Boush. Around 1837 she was sold to slave trader William H. Williams, owner of the Yellow House in Washington, D.C. While owned by Williams, she was used to ship 27 enslaved convicts from Virginia who had been condemned to death but were sold to Rudolph Littlejohn with Williams as surety. The slaves were sold on the terms that they could be sold outside the United States but not within. The governor of Virginia corresponded with the mayor of Mobile, Alabama, and warned him that Williams and Littlejohn might try to land the Uncas in Mobile and sell them there.

Still later she was sold to Brazilian slave trader Manuel Pinto da Fonseca.
