= Tribune (brig) =

American slave ship

Tribune was one of three brigs used as slave ships that were owned by the American slave-trading firm Franklin & Armfield. Tribune was 161 tons and was built by the shipbuilder Hezekiah Childs in Connecticut in approximately 1831. Tribune was initially used as a packet-style coastwise transport between Alexandria, Virginia and New Orleans, Louisiana. Her sisters were Isaac Franklin and Uncas. As of approximately 1836, the master of Tribune was Samuel Bush. According to a report of the Albany Evening Journal that same year, "The after-hold will carry about 80 women, and the other about 100 men...On either side were two platforms running the whole length, one raised a few inches, and the other about half way up to the deck...They were about 5 1/2 or 6 feet deep. On them they lie as close as they can stow away." Around 1837 she was sold to slave trader William H. Williams, owner of the Yellow House in Washington, D.C.
