= John Armfield =

American slave trader (1797–1871)

- Born: 1797; North Carolina, U.S.
- Died: September 20, 1871 (aged 73–74); Beersheba Springs, Tennessee, U.S.
- Occupation: Slave trader
- Spouse: Martha Franklin (m. 1831)

John Armfield (1797 – September 20, 1871) was an American slave trader. He was the co-founder of Franklin & Armfield, "the largest slave trading firm" in the United States. He was also the developer of Beersheba Springs, Tennessee, and a co-founder of Sewanee: The University of the South.

== Early life ==
John Armfield was born in 1797 in North Carolina to Quaker parents. He was of English descent.

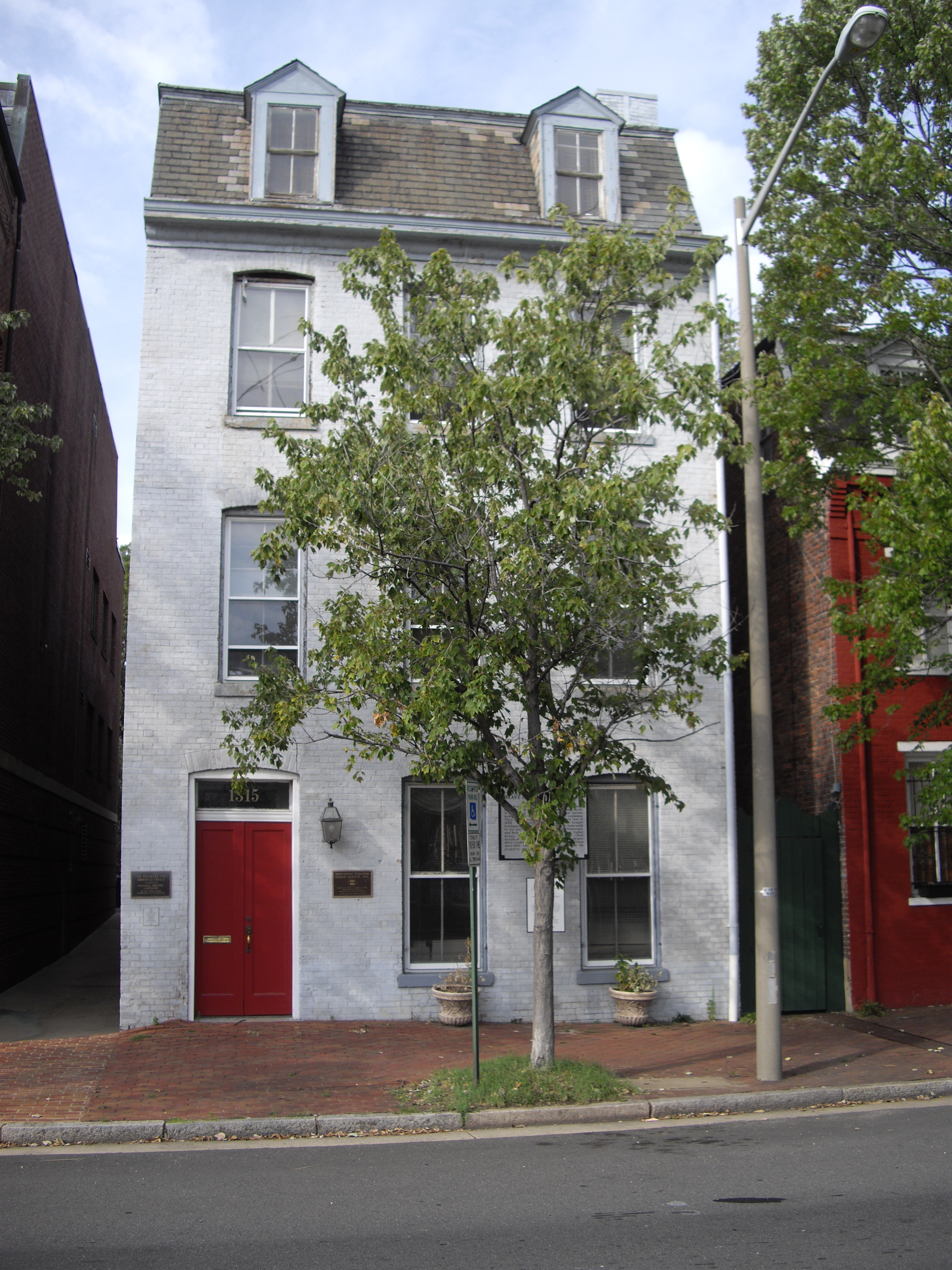
The Franklin and Armfield Office in Alexandria, Virginia.

== Career ==
Armfield took up slave trading in the 1820s, more than a decade after the Atlantic slave trade had been prohibited by the United States. The domestic slave trade had been growing rapidly. Armfield sold a slave in Natchez, Mississippi, in 1827.

In 1828, Armfield and his uncle by marriage, Isaac Franklin, formed the partnership of Franklin & Armfield to buy slaves in the Upper South: the mid-Atlantic states (Virginia, Maryland, Delaware, and the District of Columbia), where agriculture was changing and many planters had surplus slaves, and sell them in the newly opened territories of the Deep South.

In this period, many whites were moving into the Southeast and the federal government began Indian Removal. The cotton gin had made short-staple cotton profitable and there was strong demand for enslaved Africans in the domestic slave trade as workers for clearing and development of new plantations throughout this territory.

They were enormously successful and became two of the wealthiest men in the country. Franklin and Armfield were abusive to enslaved Africans and joked with each other in letters in coded language about the young enslaved women they were raping. Having gained enormous wealth, the two men dissolved the partnership in 1835 and sold the business to one of their agents, George Kephart.

Armfield retired to Middle Tennessee in 1835. Franklin had also bought plantations in that area, establishing Fairvue Plantation in Gallatin, Tennessee, and additional lands in Louisiana and Texas.

Armfield settled Gruetli, a Swiss settlement in Grundy County, Tennessee. In 1855, he developed the resort of Beersheba Springs in Grundy County, Tennessee, which attracted wealthy patrons. It still is operating. Additionally, he was the biggest single donor involved in the founding of Sewanee: The University of the South.

== Personal life and death ==
In 1831 Armfield married Martha Franklin, Isaac Franklin's niece. Armfield joined the Episcopal Church, and his wife converted from the Presbyterian faith and became an Episcopalian for him. The family attended Christ Church Cathedral in Nashville, Tennessee, as did Bishop Leonidas Polk, with whom Armfield was a close friend. Another of Armfield's close friends was John M. Bass, mayor of Nashville.

Armfield died of old age on September 20, 1871, in Beersheba Springs.

Armfield and his wife had no children. He is known to have fathered at least one child with an enslaved Black woman; he sold both her and their child. Rodney G. Williams, who is African American, has established his descent from Armfield by DNA testing.

== See also ==
- Slave trade in the United States
- List of American slave traders
