= Manuel Pinto da Fonseca (slave trader) =

Brazilian businessman (1804–1855)

- Born: 10 October 1804; Moure, Porto, Portugal
- Died: 20 October 1855; Paris, France

Manuel Pinto da Fonseca (10 October 1804 – 20 October 1855) was a 19th-century businessman described as "the most notorious slave dealer in all Brazil". His business was a "highly organized mercantile house capable of operating on four continents" and may have had up to 50 employees.

== Biography ==
Da Fonseca was born in the Porto region of Portugal in 1804. He entered the business around 1837 in company with his brothers. According to a British report based on a declaration by Da Fonseca, his profits in 1844 were £150,000. He trafficked enslaved people from Angola and the coast near the Congo River. In 1844 or 1845, Da Fonseca bought the slaving brig Uncas from Cuban shippers who had in turn bought it from American slave trader William H. Williams of Washington, D.C. Porpoise and Kentucky were also Da Fonseca's ships.

Da Fonseca's major competitors in Brazil were José Bernardino de Sá and Tomás da Costa Ramos; all three hired U.S.-flagged ships and American captains and sailors during what was known as the "contraband era".

Da Fonseca was deported to Portugal in 1851. He died in Paris in 1855.

== See also ==
- Atlantic slave trade to Brazil
