= List of Virginia slave traders =

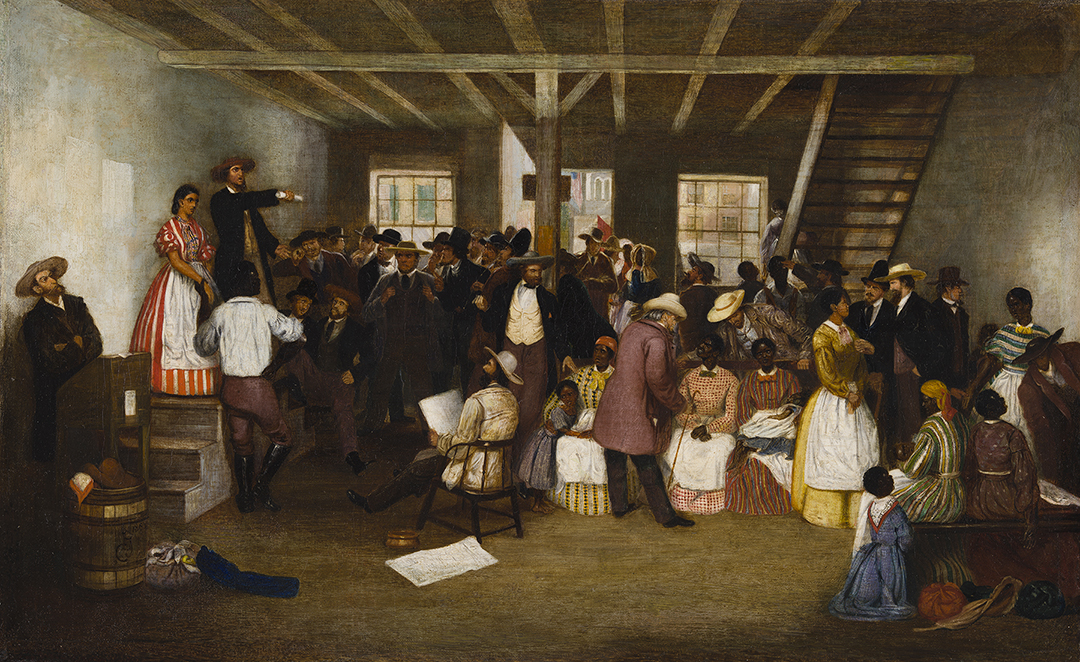
Richmond Slave Market Auction by Lefevre James Cranstone (1862)

This is a list of slave traders active in Virginia from the colonial period to 1865. Note: Alexandria was part of the District of Columbia from 1801 to 1846.

- W. Abrahams, Richmond
- Robert Alvis, Richmond
- George W. Apperson, Richmond
- G. W. Atkinson (slave jail), Richmond
- John P. Ballard, Richmond
- Betts & Omohundro, Richmond
- James Birch, Alexandria
- William H. Birch, Alexandria
- E. W. Blackburn, Richmond
- Browning, Moore & Co., Richmond
- Joseph Bruin, Alexandria
- E. A. J. Clopton, Richmond
- E. B. Cook, Richmond
- Dabney & Cauthorn, Richmond
- Ansley Davis, Petersburg
- B. Davis, Richmond
- George Davis, Lynchburg
- Hector Davis, Richmond
- Henry Davis, Petersburg
- John B. Davis, Richmond
- Benjamin & Solomon Davis, Richmond
- Solomon Davis, Richmond
- William Deupree or Dupree, Richmond
- R. H. Dickinson & Brother, Richmond
- Edward D. Eacho, Richmond
- R. Faundron, Richmond
- Franklin & Armfield, Alexandria
- Goodin & Apperson, Richmond
- William Gouldin, Richmond
- M. Hart, Lynchburg
- Hill, Dickinson & Co. or Dickinson & Hill, Richmond
- R. D. James, Richmond
- Thomas Johnston, Richmond
- Jones & Slater (slave jail), Richmond
- George Kephart, Alexandria
- Newton M. Lee, Richmond
- Ash Levy, Richmond
- Robert Lumpkin, Richmond
- William Martin, Richmond
- Edward Matthews, Richmond
- McDaniel & Blackburn, Richmond
- Charles McMurray, Richmond
- William Murphy, Richmond
- E. Myers, Lynchburg
- Solomon Myers, Richmond
- Nott, Alexander & Co., Richmond
- John Omenhiser, Richmond
- O. Omohundro, Richmond
- Silas Omohundro, Richmond
- Otis, Dunlop & Co., Richmond
- Overley & Sanders, Petersburg and Maryland
- Peck, Lay & Co., Richmond
- Charles Phelps, Richmond
- Dabney Price, Richmond
- Price, Birch & Co., Alexandria
- Pulliam & Betts, Richmond
- David M. Pulliam, Richmond
- Peter Pulliam, Richmond
- Samuel Reese, Richmond
- Francis Everod Rives, Petersburg and Natchez
- Robinson and Smith
- Leonard T. Slater, Richmond
- Smith & Edmondson (or Edmonston), Richmond
- John W. Starke, Norfolk
- P. M. Tabb & Son, Richmond
- Bacon Tait, Richmond and New Orleans
- James M. Taylor & Son, Richmond
- H. N. Templeman, Richmond
- John J. Toler, Richmond
- Peterfield Trent, Richmond
- Fleming Tucker, Richmond
- John J. Whitehurst, Norfolk
- Seth Woodroof, Lynchburg
- Charles T. Wortham, Richmond
- William Wortham, Richmond
- William Wyatt, Richmond

== See also ==
- The Cage
- Richmond, Virginia slave market
- List of District of Columbia slave traders
- List of Maryland and Delaware slave traders
- Bibliography of the slave trade in the United States

== Sources ==
- Bancroft, Frederic (2023) [1931, 1996]. Slave Trading in the Old South (Original publisher: J. H. Fürst Co., Baltimore). Southern Classics Series. Introduction by Michael Tadman (Reprint ed.). Columbia, S.C.: University of South Carolina Press. ISBN 978-1-64336-427-8. LCCN 95020493. OCLC 1153619151.
- Heier, Jan Richard (March 2010). "Accounting for the Business of Suffering: A Study of the Antebellum Richmond, Virginia, Slave Trade". Abacus: A Journal of Accounting, Finance, and Business Studies. 46 (1): 60–83. doi:10.1111/j.1467-6281.2010.00306.x.
- McInnis, Maurie D. (Fall 2013). "Mapping the slave trade in Richmond and New Orleans". Building & Landscapes. 20 (2): 102–125. doi:10.5749/buildland.20.2.0102. JSTOR 10.5749/buildland.20.2.0102. S2CID 160472953. Project MUSE 538683.
- Tadman, Michael (September 2007). "The Reputation of the Slave Trader in Southern History and the Social Memory of the South". American Nineteenth Century History. 8 (3): 247–271. doi:10.1080/14664650701505117. ISSN 1466-4658.
