= List of District of Columbia slave traders =

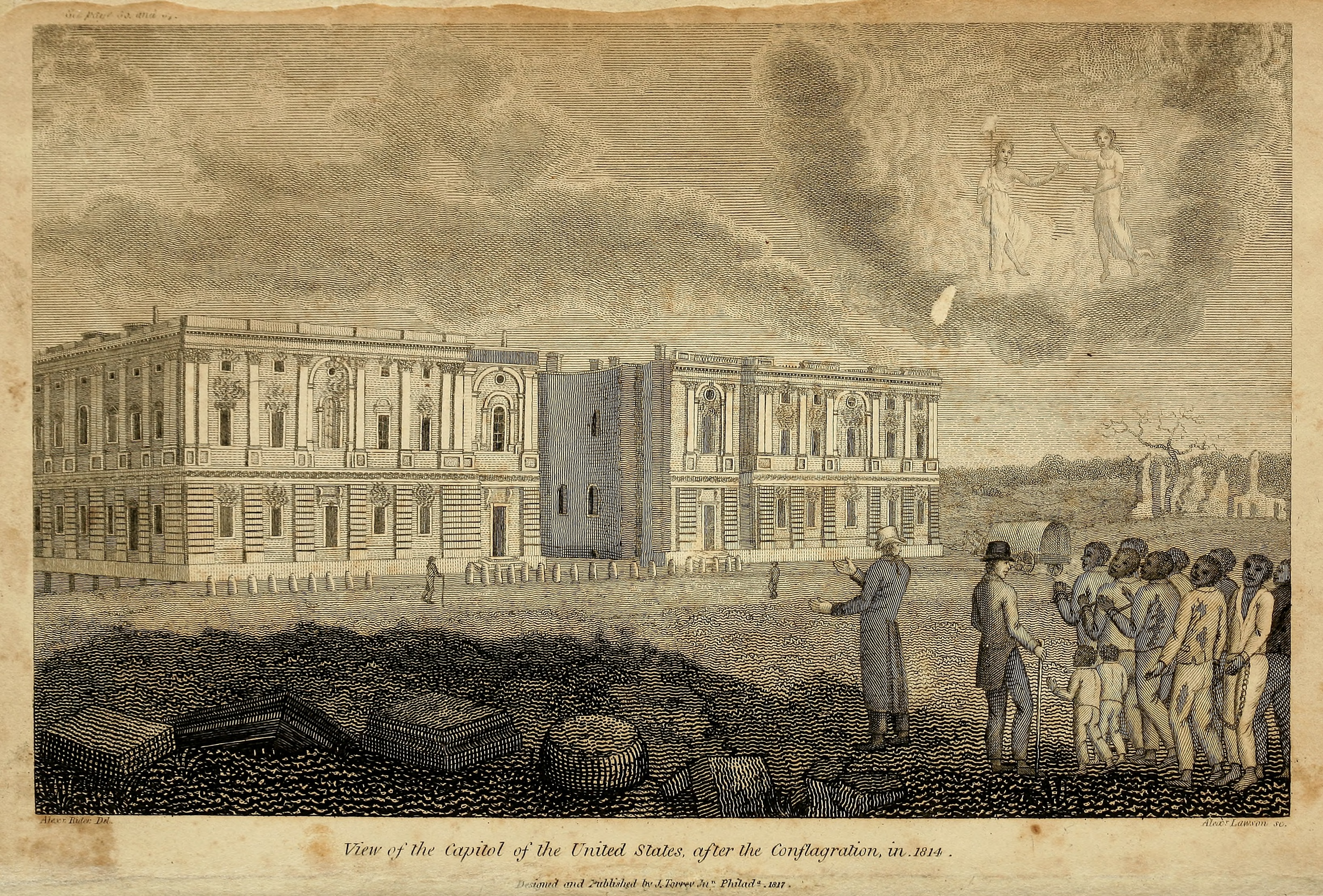
"On the 4th day of December, 1815, (the day on which the session of congress commenced,) being at the seat of government of the United States, I was preparing to enjoy the first opportunity that had occurred to me, of beholding the assembled representatives of the American republic. As I was about to proceed to the building where the session was opened, my agreeable reverie was suddenly interrupted by the voice of a stammering boy, who, as he was coming into the house, from the street, exclaimed, 'There goes the Ge-Ge-orgy-men* with a drove o' niggers chain'd together two and two.' What's that, said I,—I must see,—and, going to the door, I just had a distant glimpse of a light covered waggon, followed by a procession of men, women and children, resembling that of a funeral. I followed them hastily; and as I approached so near as to discover that they were bound together in pairs, some with ropes, and some with iron chains (which I had hitherto seen used only for restraining beasts)." [Torrey's note: *On first hearing this epithet used, I was at a loss to account for its meaning. I have since observed that, in the middle states, the general title applied to slave-traders, indiscriminately, is Georgia-men.] ("View of the Capitol of the United States after the Conflagration of 1814" from Jesse Torrey's A portraiture of domestic slavery in the United States, published 1817)

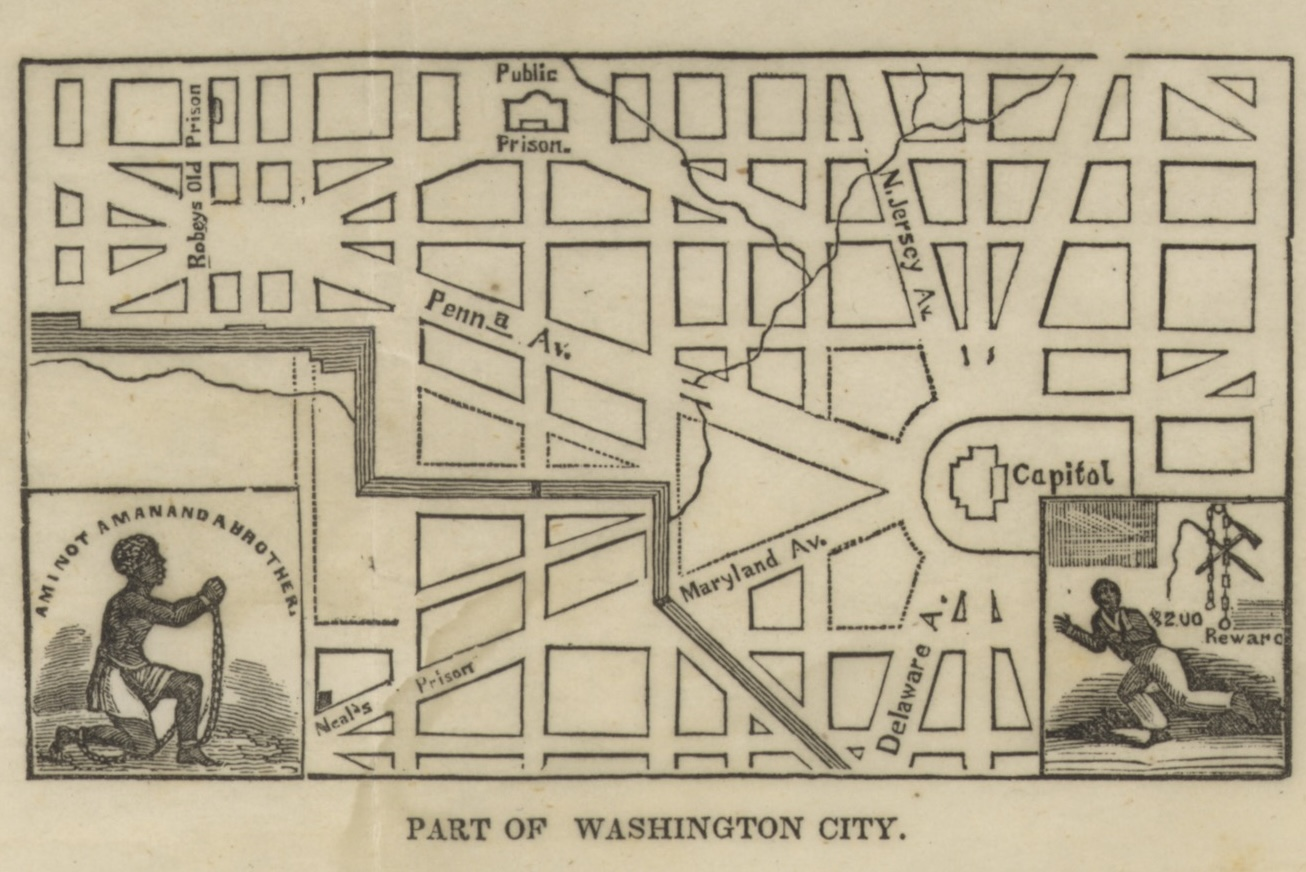
Robey's 7th and 9th Street taverns and slave jails were pictured on this 1836 map produced by the American Anti-Slavery Society; the 7th Street property is listed as Neal's Jail

This is a list of slave traders working in the District of Columbia from 1776 until 1865, including traders operating in Alexandria, Virginia before the establishment of the District in 1800 and after the retrocession in 1847:

- Jesse Bernard
- James H. Birch, District of Columbia and Alexandria, Va.
- A. W. Brandon
- Jack Brinkley
- James Childress and George A. Phifer
- Davis & Kincaid
- Samuel J. Dawson, Natchez, Miss. Washington, D.C. and Alabama
- Jesse Dollerhide
- Jilson Dove, Washington, D.C. and Montgomery County, Maryland
- Dyer family, District of Columbia
- Robert W. Fenwick, Washington, D.C.
- Franklin & Armfield, Alexandria
- John Gadsby
- John Gales
- James Green, Washington, and Newport, Maryland
- Haden, Washington, D.C.
- William Harding
- Samuel C. Hunt
- S. C. Hunt, James Austin & Edward Smith
- John S. Hutchinson
- John S. Hutcherson, Georgetown, D.C.
- George Kephart, Maryland, Virginia, District of Columbia
- E. P. Legg, District of Columbia
- Thomas Magruder, Washington, D.C.
- Jesse Meek Jr., Washington, D.C. and Louisiana
- George Miller, F Street
- Joseph W. Neal, District of Columbia
- Mellon, Alexandria
- Thomas Milburn, Washington, D.C.
- William H. Richards, Washington, D.C.
- Tench Ringold, Washington, D.C.
- Thomas Robertson
- John Edward Robey, Washington, D.C.
- Washington Robey, Washington, D.C.
- Joseph Semmes, Georgetown, D.C.
- Simpson, Washington during the Jackson administration
- Thomas Williams, Washington, D.C., Virginia, and Vidalia, Miss.
- Williams H. Williams
- Williams, Washington, D.C.
- Jackson M. Yancey
- Ann Young & Peter Hevener

== See also ==
- History of slavery in the District of Columbia
- List of slave traders of the United States
- List of Maryland and Delaware slave traders
- List of Virginia slave traders

== Sources ==
- Bancroft, Frederic (2023) [1931]. Slave Trading in the Old South. Southern Classics Series. Introduction by Michael Tadman. University of South Carolina Press. ISBN 978-1-64336-427-8.
- Colby, Robert K. D. (2024). An Unholy Traffic: Slave Trading in the Civil War South. Oxford University Press. doi:10.1093/oso/9780197578261.001.0001. ISBN 9780197578285. LCCN 2023053721. OCLC 1412042395.
- Fitzpatrick, Benjamin Lewis (December 2008). Negroes for Sale: The Slave Trade in Antebellum Kentucky (Ph.D. thesis). University of Notre Dame. doi:10.7274/pn89d50750n.
- Hedrick, Charles Embury (1927). Social and Economic Aspects of Slavery in the Transmontane Prior to 1850. George Peabody College for Teachers. Contributions to education.no. 46. Nashville, Tennessee: George Peabody College for Teachers.
- Jay, William (1844). A View of the Action of the Federal Government, In Behalf of Slavery. Utica, N.Y.: J.C. Jackson.
- Jones-Rogers, Stephanie E. (2019). They Were Her Property: White Women as Slave Owners in the American South. New Haven, Connecticut: Yale University Press. ISBN 978-0-300-21866-4.
- Stowe, Harriet Beecher (1853). A key to Uncle Tom's cabin: presenting the original facts and documents upon which the story is founded. Boston: J. P. Jewett & Co. LCCN 02004230. OCLC 317690900. OL 21879838M.
- Wilson, Carol (2009) [1994]. Freedom at Risk: The Kidnapping of Free Blacks in America, 1780–1865. University Press of Kentucky. ISBN 9780813149790. JSTOR j.ctt130j5m9. LCCN 93021012. OCLC 900344359.
