= Suicide, infanticide, and self-mutilation by slaves in the United States =

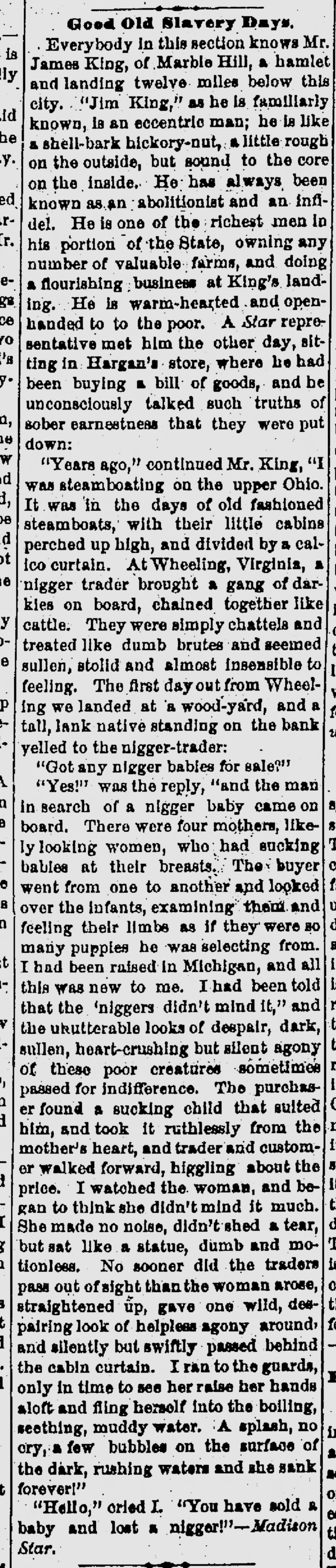
James King (1801–1885) of Indiana recounted seeing a slave trader sell an infant off its mother's breast at a steamboat woodyard "one day out from Wheeling, Virginia", in response to which the woman threw herself into the Ohio River (Cambridge City Tribune, 1880)

Suicide, infanticide, and self-mutilation by slaves in the United States was documented, although it remains an understudied aspect of slavery in the United States.

== Suicide ==
Overall suicide rates of black slaves in the United States are believed to have been comparatively low, in part due to cultural beliefs common to both Africa and African-American communities. Africa has the lowest suicide rate of any continent, and the suicide rate of African-descended Americans is a fraction of that of European-descended Americans. When an enslaved person did die by suicide, it was often due to "deterioration in their circumstances or unfulfilled expectation." Researchers have found that, as a rule, "when slaves did choose suicide, the reasons for it were almost always directly connected with their condition of servitude."

The highest rates of suicide amongst enslaved people brought to the Thirteen Colonies and the United States appeared to have occurred during and immediately after the Middle Passage. The proximate psychological cause of these suicides was the "trauma of captivity" leading to either "anxiety and self-mutilation or depression and stupor." Suicide rates among this population appear to have been slightly higher among men, those who were alone without others from their community, and older people. A "disproportionate amount" of the suicides that occurred in the immediate wake of being trafficked appear to have been individuals who had been high-status members of their communities back home. An example of this may be found in 1898 account of the people who were illegally trafficked to the United States on the Wanderer, which stated that a number of survivors later committed suicide under the belief that "if they would jump into the sea and drown themselves they would be carried back to Africa by the good spirits...among them being one called King Mingo, who decoyed two children to St. Simon's beach, during the absence of his mistress, and all three of them jumped from a high bluff into the swift current and were drowned."

In one text, suicides described in slave narratives were majority male, with drowning being the most common method. The proximate cause of suicides described in slave narratives was typically either past or future "punishment" by violence, failed escape, or forthcoming sale, including being "threatened with separation from a spouse and children as a result of being sold to another slave owner."

A type of slave suicide that scholars speculate may have existed but that cannot be readily studied is "suicide by slave owner" (as per suicide by cop).

European slavers of the 19th century maintained a number of folk beliefs about which ethnic groups were most likely to commit suicide or use certain methods to kill themselves. The Ibo of Nigeria were asserted to be especially likely to kill themselves if abducted into slavery.

Mary Gaffney, interviewed for the WPA Slave Narrative Collection, described a slave who murdered his pregnant wife. The slave owner put him "in jail at night and in the daytime he had to wear chains around his legs. He never could go to any more dances or have not another free day there on the plantation...they told me he finally got hold of some wire and hung his self before freedom." A family reunification ad placed after the war sought information on scattered members of family that had been enslaved in Missouri, the author, seeking her lost sister, volunteered that "Our mother came to her death by hanging herself."

== Infanticide and filicide ==
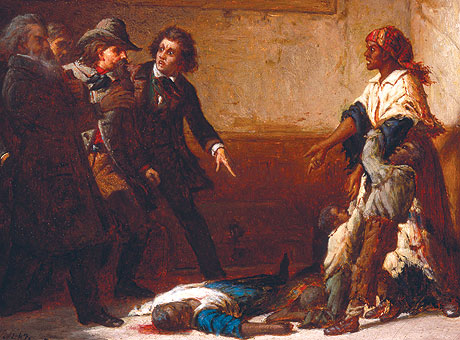
Margaret Garner

According to historian Walter Johnson, 25 percent of interstate slave trades destroyed a first marriage and 50 percent destroyed a family, "many of these separating children under the age of 13 from their parents. Nearly all of them involved the dissolution of a previously existing community." Thus, self destruction or destruction of children was arguably a means to avoid a different kind of destruction of self or family.

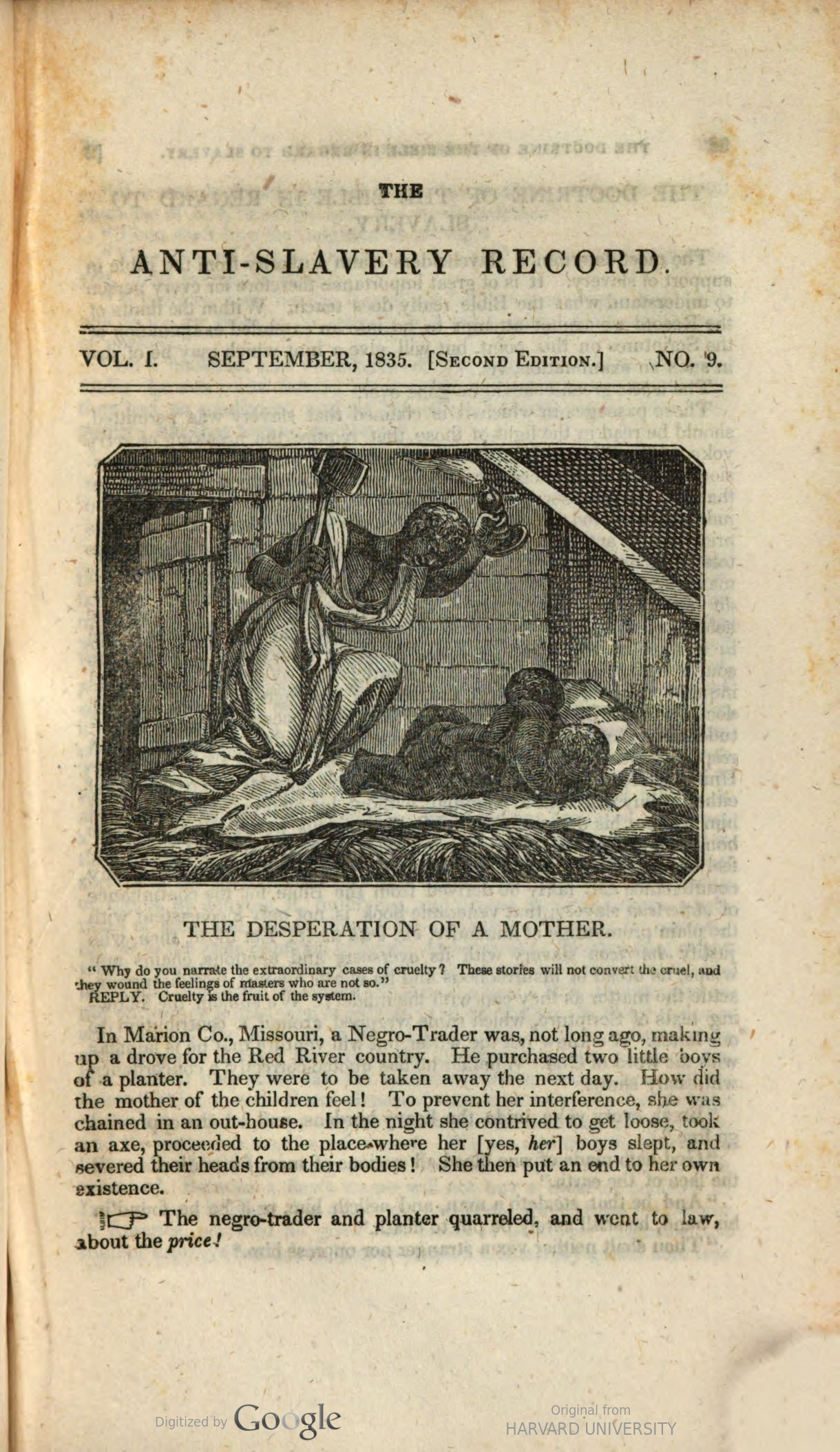
Etching of a case of infanticide in Marion County, Missouri in the early 1830s

The most famous case of infanticide in American slavery was that of Margaret Garner, who killed two of her children rather than see them delivered to slavery in the Deep South. Garner's story inspired Toni Morrison's novel Beloved and her libretto for an opera called Margaret Garner.

Similar murders appear throughout slave narratives and in contemporary newspaper reports. In 1828, Annice was executed by the state of Missouri for deliberately drowning five children, two of which were her own. In 1837, Dorcas Allen and her four children were put up for sale by her old owner's wife's new husband. While in James H. Birch's pen, she killed two of her four children rather than see them sold south. District Attorney Francis Scott Key advised Nathan Allen, husband of Dorcas and father of the children, to raise money to try to buy their freedom. With contributions from figures like John Quincy Adams, the funds were raised and Allen and her surviving children were freed. In 1831, an enslaved woman in Tennessee reportedly drowned three of her children after being "chastised" by her enslaver. In 1848, a man killed his wife and child with a pocket knife and tried to kill himself while "confined in one room" by a slave trader using the Covington, Kentucky jail. In 1851 a Louisville, Kentucky newspaper reported that "a negro who had killed her new born babe by drowning it. The Georgetown Herald in commenting upon this said that death was the legal, but transportation the usual, penalty for such crime."

On Thursday, September 2, 1852, "A negro woman belonging to George M. Garrison, of Polk county, Tenn., killed four of her children by cutting their throat while they were asleep...and then put an end to her own existence by cutting her throat. Her master knows of no cause for the horrid act, unless it be that she heard him speak of selling her and two of her children and keeping the others."

The Liberator reported in July 1855, "A beautiful mulatto girl was hanged in Eutaw, Alabama last Friday, for murdering child—the circumstances as follows: Her master was a young man and overseer; he had seduced the girl, and then bought her. When the child was three years old, he married a lady of small fortune, and bought a plantation for himself. The lady soon ascertained that her husband was the father of the child, and at once became indignant towards it, and at the slightest offence would cruelly abuse it. The mother bore it with patience for a while, but seeing her mistress get no better, she knocked the child's brains out with an axe, went to the Court House, told the circumstances, gave herself up, and was committed to prison."

According to Modern Medea (1999), a re-examination of the Margaret Garner case in history and legend, "In November 1859 on the Georgia plantation of Charles Colcock Jones, a slave named Lucy came under suspicion for giving birth to and then smothering her newborn with assistance from a black midwife. For twelve days Lucy denied even bearing a child, until a physician's examination confirmed that she had. Farmhands then recovered the infant's decomposing body, and Lucy and her midwife were brought to a hearing before the local magistrates. Both women insisted the infant was stillborn and hours of interrogation failed to shake their story. Because Lucy admitted the birth and her deceit, the magistrates summarily convicted her of 'concealment' and ordered eight days' imprisonment accompanied by 'corporeal punishment to the amount of ninety stripes, inflicted at intervals of two and three days, one third at a time'—a brutally severe penalty." A female slave owner named Lucy Battle reported a case of infanticide to her husband, writing about a "favorite servant" named Cinda, who was unmarried and "had always borne good character, indeed she was a shouting Methodist," who had smothered her three-month-old baby to death.

== Self-mutilation ==
According to Francis Scott Key, in the early days of the District of Columbia, an enslaved woman "on learning that she had been sold, promptly grabbed a meat cleaver and hacked off one of her hands, rendering her unfit for sale in the eyes of the slave trader." In 1829 an enslaved man who was part of a coffle being transported South by Virginia trader Jourdan M. Saunders "got possession of an axe, and cut off all of the fingers of his right hand." Circa 1835, an enslaved man in Virginia cut off his own hand, annoying slave traders Meek, Logan, Haynes, and Magee, who then had to try to swap him for a two-handed slave, since the value of a one-handed slave could be "counted as nothing." In 2003, a woman living in Maysville, Kentucky, recalled her great-grandmother telling her about "a slave mother so bereft at her forced separation from her daughter, who was being sold downriver, that she cut off her hand in despair."

== See also ==
- Suicide prevention
- Suicide intervention
- Enslaved women's resistance in the United States and Caribbean
- Slave rebellion and resistance in the United States
- Torture of slaves in the United States
- Suicide among Native Americans in the United States
- Annice (slave)
