= Dorcas Allen =

19th-century enslaved American mother and murderer

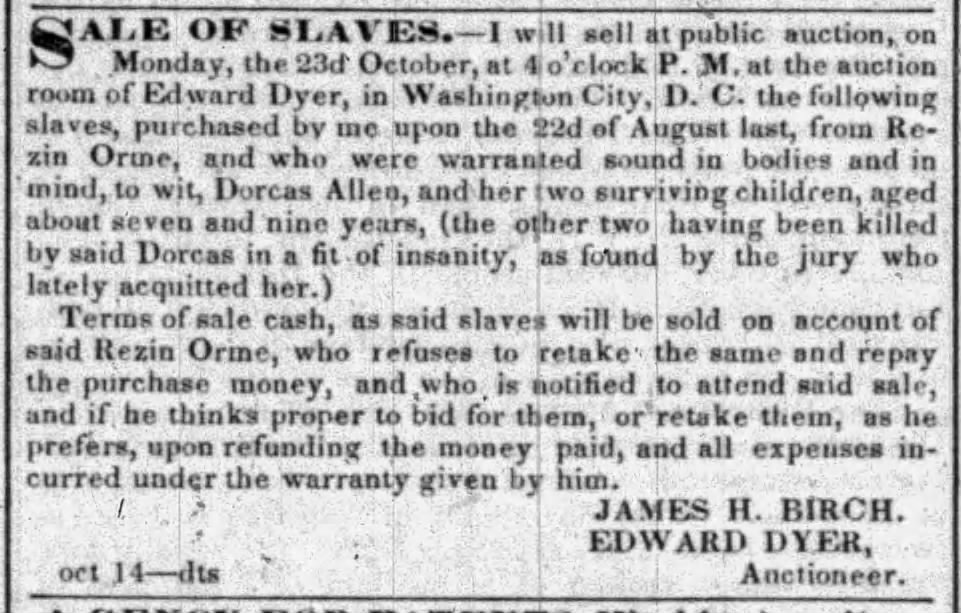
- "Sale of Slaves" (Daily National Intelligencer, Washington, D.C., October 18, 1837)

Dorcas Allen was an enslaved American mother who killed two of her four children when the family was jailed by slave traders in 1837.

== History ==
In 1837, Allen and her children had been sold to James H. Birch by Allen's former owner's wife's new husband. While in George Kephart's three-story Duke Street slave pen in Alexandria, District of Columbia, which had previously been operated by Franklin & Armfield, Allen killed two of her four children rather than see them sold south. Tried for the murders, Allen was found not guilty of one of the deaths, and the prosecutors then declined to take the second charge to trial. She was remanded to the custody of trader Birch, and District Attorney Francis Scott Key advised Nathan Allen, husband of Dorcas and father of the children, to raise money to try to buy their freedom. With donations from prominent, prosperous white men in the District of Columbia, including former U.S. president John Quincy Adams, who contributed $50, Nathan Allen was able to buy his wife and surviving children. The Allen family left the District of Columbia and moved to Rhode Island.

== See also ==
- Suicide, infanticide, and self-mutilation by slaves in the United States
- Philip Lee (valet) – Enslaved American (b. c. 1785)

== Sources ==
- Mann, Alison T. (2015). ""Horrible Barbarity": The 1837 Murder Trial of Dorcas Allen, a Georgetown Slave". Washington History. 27 (1): 3–14. ISSN 1042-9719.
- Nunley, Tamika (2021). At the Threshold of Liberty: Women, Slavery, and Shifting Identities in Washington, D.C. John Hope Franklin Series in African American History and Culture. Chapel Hill: University of North Carolina Press. ISBN 978-1-4696-6221-3.
