= James F. Purvis =

American slave trader and banker (1808–1880)

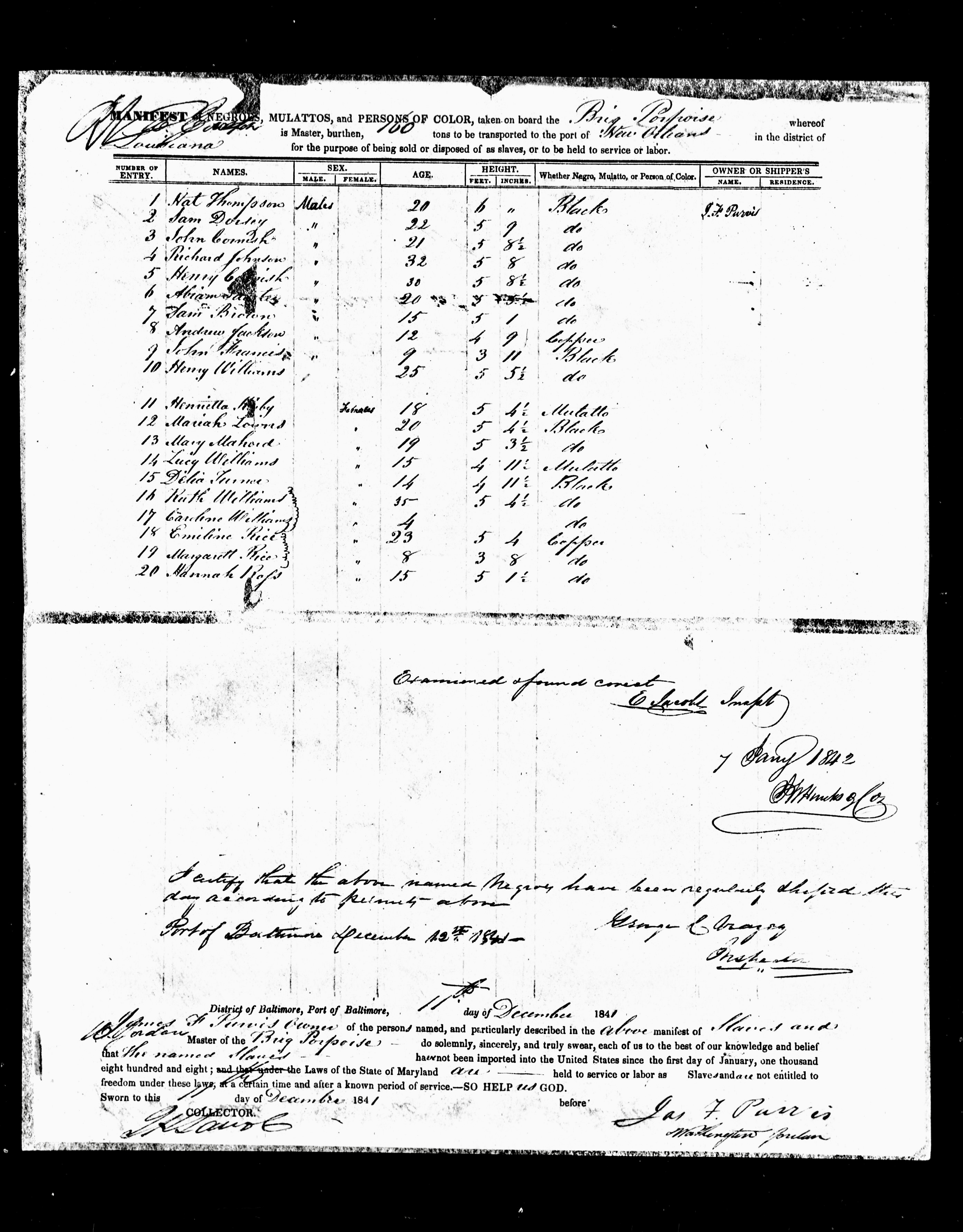
- Manifest listing people shipped by Purvis on the brig Porpoise, departing Baltimore Dec. 11, 1841, arriving New Orleans Jan. 7, 1842
- Born: c. 1808; Tennessee, U.S.
- Died: April 23, 1880; Maryland, U.S.
- Resting place: Green Mount Cemetery
- Occupations: Slave trader, landowner, banker

James Franklin Purvis (c. 1808 – April 23, 1880) was an American slave trader, broker, and banker who worked primarily in Baltimore. He was a nephew of Isaac Franklin of Franklin & Armfield, and traded in Maryland, Louisiana, and Mississippi in the 1830s and early 1840s. In 1842 he became a devout Methodist, quit the slave trade, and transitioned into real estate, banking, and stock brokering. After his bank failed in 1868, he retired to Carroll County, Maryland, where he died of a heart attack in 1880 at age 72.

== Slave trade ==
Allen Purvis and Margaret Franklin were married on December 27, 1806, and their son James F. Purvis was born about 1808 in Tennessee. Purvis' mother, Margaret Franklin, was older sister to Isaac Franklin, founder of the interstate slave-trading firm Franklin & Armfield. His father, Allen Purvis, was also a slave trader, who "in the early nineteenth century both sold people in Natchez himself and consigned enslaved people to the Franklin brothers to sell on his behalf."

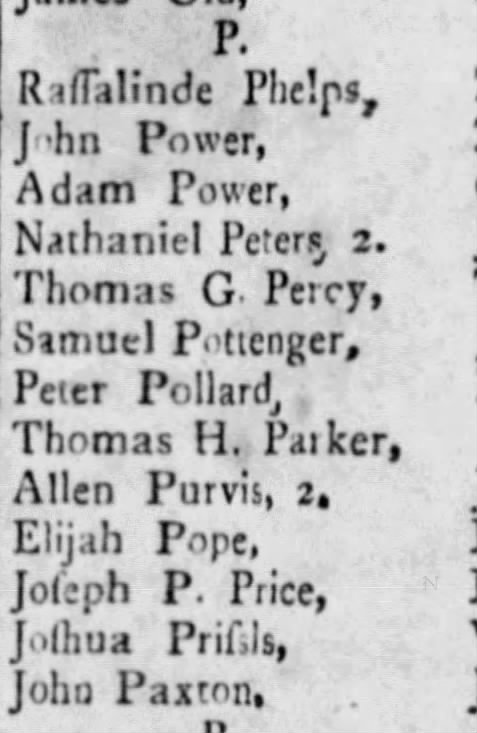
There was mail waiting for Allen Purvis (and Isaac Franklin's older brother James Franklin) at Natchez in July 1809; until the 1820s, the Natchez slave market was more important than the New Orleans slave market

Historians of the interstate slave trade believe that James Purvis started his working life in Washington and then moved to Baltimore in the early 1830s, "first operating out of Sinner's Tammany Hall on Water Street. According to Frederic Bancroft in Slave-Trading in the Old South, "Purvis & Company did a large business notwithstanding their strange address: their headquarters was at Sinner's Hotel and they lived 'on Gallows hill, near the Missionary church—the house is white'. They continually advertised—at times, twice on the same page in a Baltimore daily newspaper and also in rural weekly journals; for they bought slaves of all kinds in their city and throughout the State, turning over those most suitable for the Louisiana and the Mississippi markets to a great firm in the District of Columbia." The Sinner's Hotel was located on the southwest corner of Albemarle and Water streets. The home on Gallows Hill near the Missionary Church was at Eden and Aisquith streets.

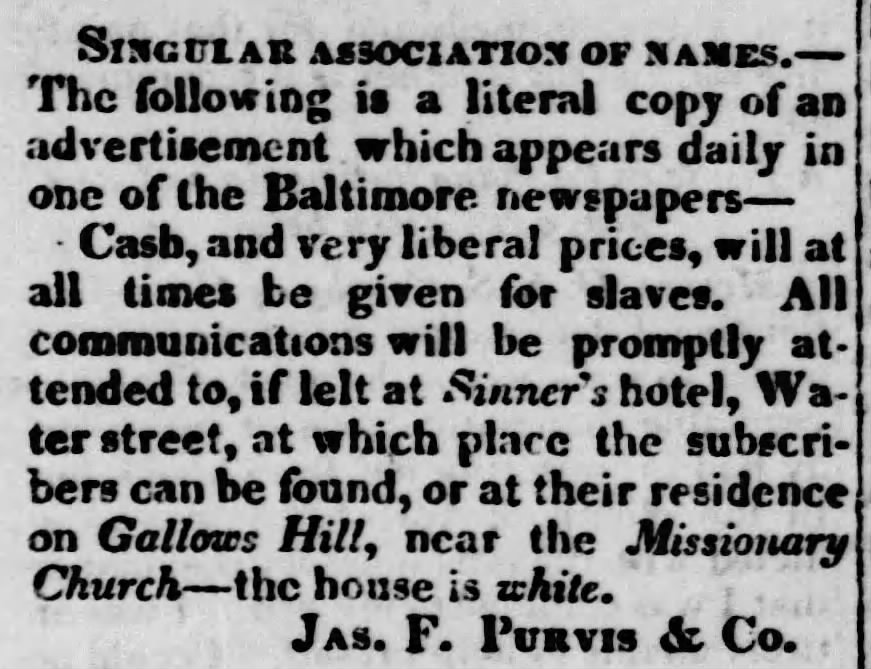
"Singular Association of Names" Richmond (Ind.) Weekly Palladium, Nov. 16, 1833

Purvis later opened his own office on Calvert Street. The Calvert Street office was near Market and "one door below the opposition Stage Office" and had previously been operated as a tavern, first by Hamphrys, and then by Hilberg. Purvis also seems to have an agent or partner named Harker who was usually ensconced opposite the B&O Railroad depot at William Whitman's Eagle Hotel on Pratt Street east of Light. In later years, "Mr. Bloomer's hat store" had moved in next door to the Calvert Street office, and Purvis' brother was the man to find at the Eagle Hotel. According to an online exhibit produced by the Baltimore Sun called Seeing the Unseen: Baltimore's Slave Trade in Photos, Purvis both lived and had a slave jail just north of town: "1225 Harford Ave., now missing its third floor, marks the site of a long-gone 1830s home and slave jail of trader James Franklin Purvis. Purvis once bragged that his pen, 'in one of the highest and most healthy parts of the city, having a free circulation of air, and a yard for exercise throughout the day must necessarily be more healthy than in the center of the city, especially in hot weather.'" Years later, just after the American Civil War had ended, a man named James P. Thomas may have owned this property; he advertised that he wanted to sell "that large, commodious DWELLING, with brick Back Building, fine cellar, stable, gas and water complete, situated on Harford avenue, near Biddle street; built and occupied for years by James F. Purvis, Esq."

Circa 1833–34, Franklin & Armfield had five major trading agents at work collecting enslaved people in the Upper South for shipment to buyers in the lower Mississippi watershed: R. C. Ballard and Jourdan M. Saunders in Virginia, and George Kephart, Thomas M. Jones, and Purvis in Maryland. The affiliates worked together as needed. In spring 1835, another Franklin & Armfield affiliate, J. M. Saunders & Co. sent 14 slaves to Purvis' office in Natchez. According to professor Tomoko Yagyu, Thomas McCargo was a subsidiary trader to Purvis of Baltimore, who was, in turn, of course, subsidiary to Franklin & Armfield.

At one point Purvis shipped a cargo of people to McCargo in New Orleans on a packet called Orleans. Purvis was the shipper and McCargo the consignee on 57 people sent from Richmond as part of a total cargo of 117 people, who arrived in Louisiana minus "one child who died on the passage" in December 1838. In the late 1830s a newspaper advertisement mentioning Purvis caught the attention of abolitionist William Jay, who later included it in his book on the ways in which the U.S. federal government protected and promoted slavery: "For New-Orleans. — A coppered, copper-fastened packet-brig Isaac Franklin, will sail on the 1st Feb. for Baltimore. Those having servants to ship will do well by making early application to James F. Purvis" or to George Kephart, who now operated out of the old Franklin & Armfield building in Alexandria. The University of Virginia Libraries hold a collection of letters to slave trader William Crow; according to a collection guide created by the library, Thomas Jackson wrote to Crow in autumn 1839 that the Richmond market was weak in both price and sales volume, but that "McCargo and Purvis had sold all of their slaves." Purvis shipped four lots from the Upper South to New Orleans in 1840, totaling 59 people.

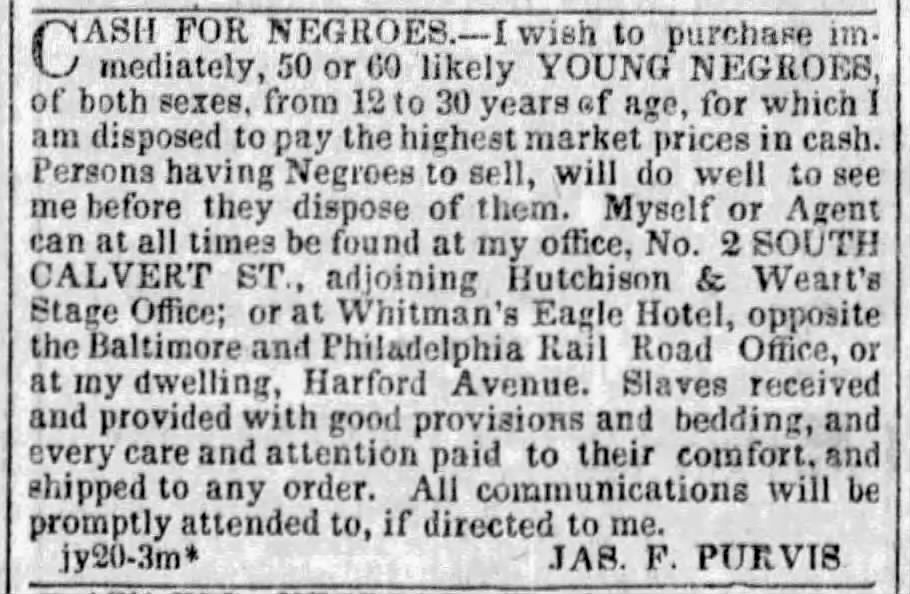
"Cash for Negroes" Baltimore Sun, October 12, 1839

In November 1838 in Baltimore, Purvis was party to the complicated case of State vs. Negro Henry Ash, which seemed to involve both conspiracy to commit fraud (by "Negro Henry Ash" and George King alias Anson B. Cook against Purvis, by passing off a free person of color as a slave for life) and kidnapping by inveiglement (in which "Negro Henry Ash" was the victim of George King alias Anson B. Cook).

In late summer 1840 a particular enslaved man named John Murphy was giving Purvis fits. In September 1840, Purvis placed not one but two newspaper ads referencing Murphy. The first offered a modest reward: "STOP THIEF! 50 DOLLAR REWARD. The subscriber's dwelling was entered on Sunday, August 30, and robbed of a considerable quantity of valuable clothing, consisting of coats, pants, &c &c and some ladies apparel, also a Silver Watch. There is no doubt the above robbery was perpetrated by a negro fellow who calls himself John Murphy." Purvis also placed a fugitive slave ad in the newspaper offering US$500 (equivalent to $16,125 in 2025) for the recapture of Murphy, "who left my premises on Monday, 30th August, under the pretence of going to the Camp Meeting on the Liberty Road, 6 or 7 miles out. Had on when he left, a black summer coat, light pantaloons, and black fur hat, nearly new. He has a variety of clothing, and will no doubt change his dress. John is 21 or 22 years of age, slender made, about 5 feet 6 or 7 inches high has no marks recollected, except a scar on the back part of his head, caused by a burn when small, and is of a dark copper color. He left without any provocation, and I have no doubt is making for a Free State. I will give the above reward for his apprehension, no matter where taken."

Travelers who wished to imprison their slaves for a limited time could, in 1841, use Purvis' facilities for 25 cents a day; he promised "safekeeping" and "every attention paid to their comfort and cleanliness."

In 1842, Purvis placed an ad in the newspaper declaring that "The subscriber, having quit the Trade entirely, offers for sale his establishment on Harford Avenue. Persons wishing to purchase will please make early application to the undersigned, as he is desirous of closing his business in this country immediately." The advertisement appeared in a newspaper of Richmond, Virginia, rather than in a Maryland paper, no doubt because, as of 1842, Richmond's Shockoe Bottom hosted the largest and most important slave market in the Upper South.

== Builder, broker, banker, bricks ==
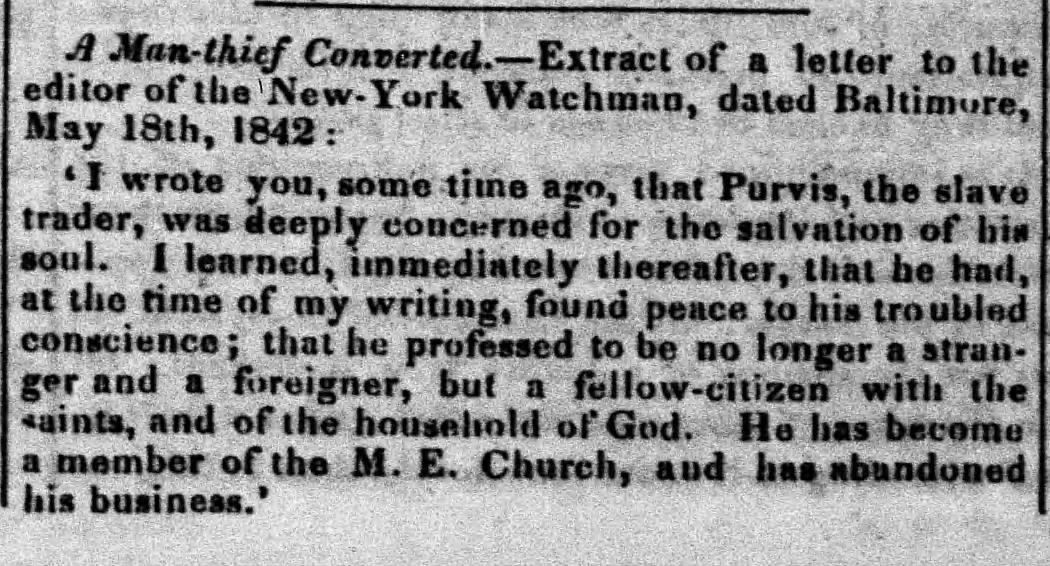
"A Man-Thief Converted" The Liberator, June 17, 1842

Bancroft observed in 1931 that Purvis was the only one of the "conspicuous" Baltimore traders of the 1830s still working in the 1850s, although it was not clear whether or not Purvis continued trading: his firm was listed in Baltimore city directories as "'stock-brokers' doing an 'exchange & collection' business." The answer, according to an 1855 newspaper article by Solon Beale, a Maine-born abolitionist who worked as a schoolteacher in Baltimore, was that Purvis had stopped trading in the 1840s: "In 1842, James F. Purvis, from Tennessee, had a slave prison, in the upper part of the city, called Hartford Avenue. He was always too good a man to be engaged in that business, and in a great revival of religion joined the Methodist church, and has been a faithful Christian ever since engaged in various works of faith, and labors of love. The slave business was of course abandoned, instanter." It may be incidental, then, that in November 1841, Purvis' associate McCargo was taken prisoner during the Creole mutiny, which is generally considered the most successful slave rebellion in U.S. history. Joshua D. Rothman also reported in The Ledger and the Chain: How Domestic Slave Traders Shaped America (2021), that in October 1843, "the Christian Reflector magazine wrote that he had 'converted to Christianity under Methodist preaching, became a good man, and quit' the slave trade...Purvis's path was so rare because slave traders who displayed guilt, shame, or remorse were so rare."

According to legal historian Martha Jones, over time Purvis "gained in reputation as he worked to transform himself from disreputable slave trader to entrepreneurial gentleman." He listed a residential property on Harford Avenue for rent, and also started working as what might now be called a real-estate developer, building three new two-story houses on Harford Avenue. Purvis maintained his connection with William Whitman, proprietor of the Eagle Hotel. In 1844, Whitman announced that he was going into the brick-making business; (Note: For another intersection of brickmaking and slave trading in Baltimore, see Jonathan M. Wilson § Moses G. Hindes.) buyers interested in purchasing BRICKS—BRICKS—BRICKS could either visit him on Pratt Street or go to see James Purvis on Harford Avenue. In 1846 Purvis bought the Zion Church of a black Methodist congregation at auction at the Baltimore Exchange for $535 and sold it back to them a year later at a profit. Purvis became a trustee of the Baltimore Female College. In the 1850s he was on the board of the city poorhouse.

At the time of the 1850 U.S. census, his occupation was exchange broker and he owned $40,000 in real estate. On the 1850 slave schedules he was listed as the legal owner of three people, a 26-year-old female, an eight-year-old boy, and five-month-old baby girl. Purvis was president of Howard Bank by 1856, when agents of the bank published a notice announcing a $100,000 stock offering. In 1856 a real estate listing described a Baltimore property listed for sale as being located near "that splendid mansion" of James F. Purvis. In December 1856 he was one of the gentlemen who would be calling around Christmastime "on the citizens of the Eighth Ward for their contributions to the city association for the relief of the suffering poor." In 1858 and 1859, he was involved in the anti-municipal corruption City Reform Association.

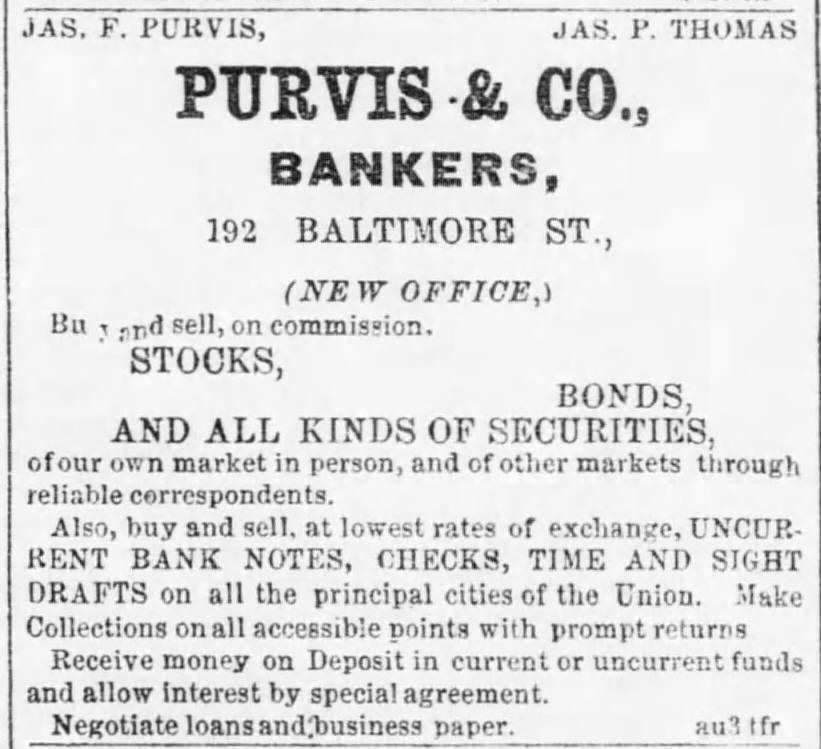
"Purvis & Co." (The Daily Exchange, Nov. 5, 1860)

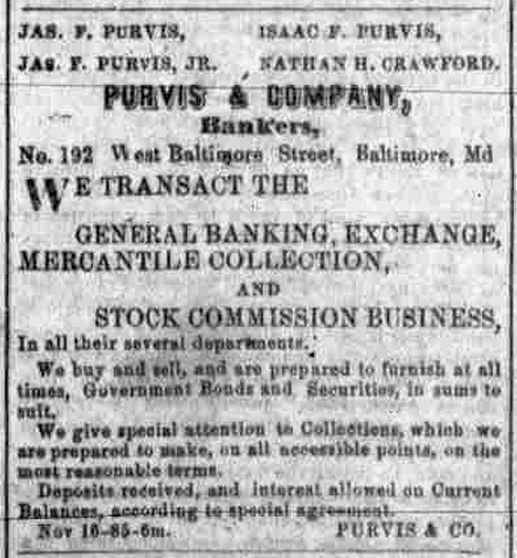
"Purvis & Co." (Raleigh Daily Sentinel, Nov. 25, 1865, via DigitalNC)

At the time of the 1860 census, Purvis' occupation was listed as banker, he owned $33,000 in real estate and $20,000 in personal property (which would have included slaves). There were two black servants enumerated with the family, Ellen Gay, age 64, and Mary Joyce, age 38. Purvis was elected president of Howard Bank in 1863. James F. Purvis Jr. lost a promissory note from his father in the amount of $5,000 in 1864. The IRS assessors of Maryland Collection District No. 2 calculated that James F. Purvis of Point Lane owned $453.85 on $9,077 in income for 1864. Purvis was unanimously re-elected as president of Howard Bank in 1867, but as of April 1867, Purvis resigned the position and was replaced by fellow long-time board member Peter Kephart. (Note: Possibly Maryland-born slave trader George Kephart's brother.) There was a trustee's sale in June 1867 of 6.5 acres of land at the end of Caroline Street in Baltimore that was owned by Purvis. The property had a "large and commodious dwelling" and a number of outbuildings, was "well shaded and highly ornamented." Sale terms would be one-third cash with the other two-thirds paid in three installments plus interest over 18 months. According to a news story published in 1900, the Purvis & Co. bank of Baltimore, founded in approximately 1844, failed in 1868.

In 1869 a James F. Purvis (unclear if Junior or Senior) announced for that he had rented Room 8 over the telegraph office at the southwest corner of Baltimore and South streets for the "purpose of buying and selling on commission STOCKS, BONDS, GOVERNMENT SECURITIES, where he would be happy to see his old friends and customers. All orders promptly attended to."

At the time of the 1870 U.S. census the family lived in Carroll County, Maryland; Purvis' occupation was listed as farmer. He reported to the enumerator that he owned real estate valued at $21,000 and personal property worth $8,000. The household included a 15-year-old mulatto domestic servant named Jane Johnson and a 22-year-old black farm laborer named Henry Wright.

Purvis died, "suddenly," at the age of 72, in the Freedom district (Note: The Freedom district, located near the confluence of the north and south forks of the Patapsco River and known as Delaware Hundred in colonial days, was an electoral district named by an early settler when Carroll County was created from Frederick and Baltimore Counties in 1837.) of Carroll County, Maryland, not far from Baltimore. According to an obituary in the Baltimore Sun, "About 1840 he engaged in the banking business in Baltimore, and upon its suspension, in 1868, removed to a farm in Carroll county, where he resided until his death. The city dwelling of Mr. Purvis, in Northeast Baltimore, when he owned it, was surrounded by a square or two of handsome grounds. This property passed out of his hands in 1868, and is now in the centre of a dense city population, with streets and blocks of houses upon the site. Mr. Purvis leaves several children." A recent brief biography of Purvis noted, "Nowhere in his obituary does it mention how he made the money he used to get into the banking business." James F. Purvis was buried in Green Mount Cemetery in Baltimore.

== Isaac F. Purvis ==
Isaac F. Purvis
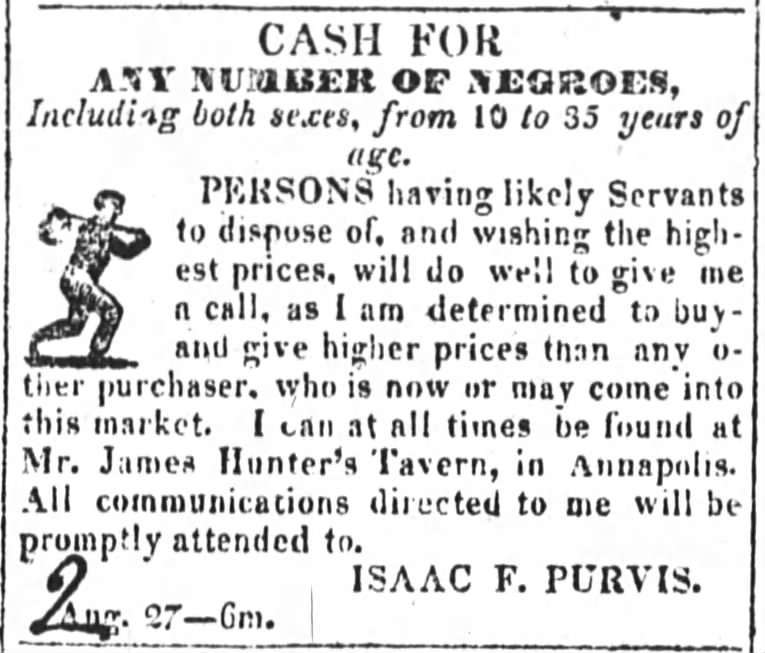
- "Cash for Any Number of Negroes" The Maryland Gazette, Annapolis, Md., August 27, 1835
- Born: c. 1813; Tennessee, U.S.
- Died: June 24, 1843; Maryland, U.S.
- Occupation: Slave trader
- Years active: 1835–1843

Isaac F. Purvis (c. 1813 – June 24, 1843) was James F. Purvis' younger brother and an American slave trader who worked around Annapolis, Maryland for several years in the 1830s. Purvis was born about 1813, probably in Tennessee. In addition to working with his brother and uncle, Purvis was associated with George Kephart of Frederick County, Maryland and later Alexandria, Virginia. In 1835 he ran a number of newspaper ads seeking to buy "any number of negroes, including both sexes, ages 10 to 35 years of age." He could regularly be found at Mr. James Hunter's tavern in Annapolis. By 1838 James Hunter tavern had become "Mrs. Hunter's tavern" and "any communications left with John Lamb" would be promptly attended to. Circa 1841, anyone wishing to sell people to James F. Purvis was encouraged to seek out his brother at the Eagle Hotel in opposite the B&O Railroad depot in Baltimore. Isaac F. Purvis died at age 30 in 1843; the funeral was held at his brother's home on Hanford Avenue.

== Personal life ==
James F. Purvis and his wife Maria Louisa (Parker) Purvis were married in Baltimore in 1833. They became the parents of nine children, five boys and four girls. James F. Purvis Jr. (1834–1904) and Isaac F. Purvis (1842–c. 1874) were named for their father and uncles, respectively, and later joined their father in banking. (Note: James F. Purvis Jr. graduated from a Methodist college in Pennsylvania and later became a Harrisburg banker and real estate man.) James F. Purvis Sr.'s widow survived him by more than 15 years and died in 1896. One Methodist Church historian looked into the family history and wrote:

Despite their early involvement with the slave trade, the family was socially and financially well-connected in Baltimore...they were also very Methodist—Mr. Purvis being a trustee of the Baltimore Female College, which operated under the patronage of the Baltimore Annual Conference. The family appears to have been active in the founding of Baltimore's Harford Avenue Methodist Episcopal Church in 1843, and James F. Purvis was a member of the 1850 building committee for that congregation's new building and served as a class leader."

== See also ==
- List of American slave traders
- History of slavery in Maryland
- Bibliography of the slave trade in the United States
- John S. Montmollin
