= Trevanion =

Historic home in Maryland, United States

- U.S. National Register of Historic Places
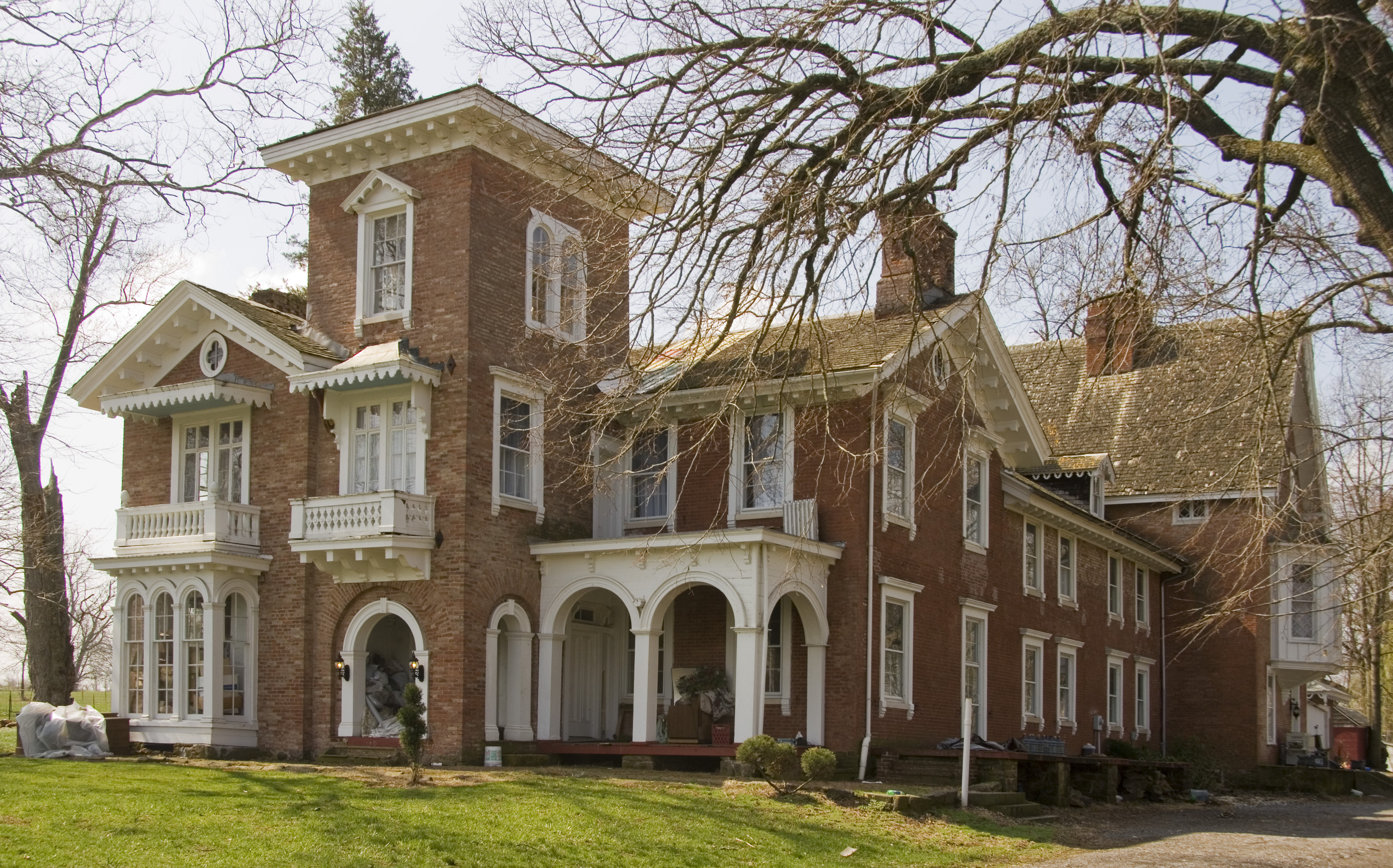

- Location within Maryland Location within the United States
- Location: 1800 Trevanion Road, Uniontown, Maryland
- Coordinates: 39°37′27″N 77°8′25″W
- Area: 7.8 acres (3.2 ha)
- Built: 1817
- Architectural style: Italian Villa
- NRHP reference No.: 77000687
- Added to NRHP: September 15, 1977

Trevanion is a historic home located at Uniontown, Carroll County, Maryland, United States. It was listed on the National Register of Historic Places in 1977.

Trevanion is a 2 1/2-story brick dwelling with an asymmetrical central hall plan with a tower. The original 1817 house was converted in 1855 to the "villa style" and was then popular in America, incorporating a combination of Italianate and Gothic architecture elements. Reflecting this is a brick tower and an adjoining gable end projection. In 1857, a 3 1/2-story wing was added. "Trevanion" is a family name and a term meaning "the meeting of streams" in Welsh. The farm was previously known as "Brick Mills", and was owned by the family of slave trader George Kephart, who may have been born there.

Trevanion was listed on the National Register of Historic Places in 1977.
