= James Childress (Alabama) =

American pioneer settler (1773–1836)

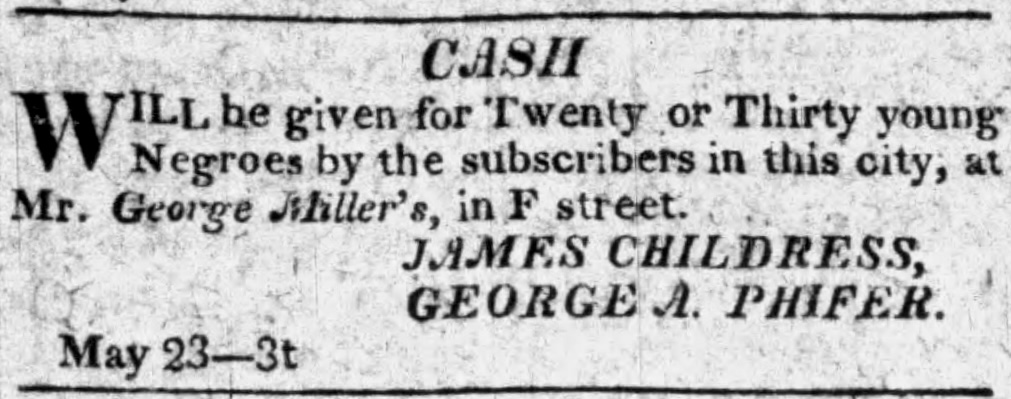
- Classified advertisement placed by Childress and Phifer, seeking to purchase 20 or 30 "young Negroes" (Daily National Intelligencer and Washington Express, May 23, 1815)
- Born: January 28, 1773; British colonial Virginia
- Died: January 18, 1836 (aged 62); Tuscaloosa, Alabama

James Childress (January 28, 1773–January 18, 1836), often referred to in print as Major Childress, was a land speculator, real estate developer, slave owner, plantation owner, and pioneer settler of Alabama, United States, involved in the establishment of both Demopolis, and Tuscaloosa. He was posthumously described as a close personal friend of Andrew Jackson. In partnership with his brother-in-law, he sought to buy a number of slaves in Washington, D.C. in 1815. He also owned two prosperous cotton plantations. Late in life he was involved in a raid against what was described as a den of counterfeiters.

== Biography ==
According to the editors of The Correspondence of James K. Polk, Major James Childress was a brother of Joel Childress and therefore an uncle of First Lady Sarah Childress Polk. Childress was born in Virginia but "removed in early manhood to North Carolina." He married his first wife, Ludica Carson, in North Carolina. They had at least three children together. Ludica Carson Childress died sometime around 1810, and "While residing in Salisbury, North Carolina, Major Childress became a widower, and subsequently married Mrs. Mary Crawford, the widow of W. D. Crawford, Esq., the mother of two children, neither of whom, however, became a citizen of Alabama." Childress married Mary Phifer Crawford around 1812. She was the daughter of American Revolutionary War veteran Martin Phifer Jr., who was said to have been "the largest land-owner in the state, and had a great number of slaves." One source says Martin Phifer was "a distinguished citizen of Carrabrus County, North Carolina," and another reports that family owned a tavern at Red Hill, on "the old road from Salisbury to Charlotte." The Crawfords lived at China Grove in Rowan County, North Carolina, and after she married Childress they lived there together for a time.

In October 1813, Toney, a slave belonging to James Childress of Rowan County, North Carolina, was wanted on charges of rape against Margaret Dodson of the same county. It was said that Toney had been "relieved from custody" by James Childress and perhaps been relocated to Rutherford County, Tennessee. Law enforcement in North Carolina sought the recapture of Toney so that he could tried in Salisbury. In December 1813, during the Creek War, Childress, James Jackson, and Edward Ward, were ordered to recruit more soldiers for Andrew Jackson's army as the enlistment terms of many under his command were due to expire.

In May 1815, Childress and his brother-in-law George A. Phifer advertised in Washington, D.C. for "twenty or thirty young Negroes." Childress and Phifer could be found at George Miller's tavern on F street and they would pay cash for the slaves.

Descendants described Childress as an "intimate personal friend" of Jackson and one daughter, born 1817, "often rode to Banbury Cross, on the knee of Gen. Jackson." Childress and his family relocated to Tuscaloosa around 1818. In 1819 Childress was one of the partners, along with Walter Crenshaw, Charles Lefebvre-Desnouettes, Joseph B. Earle, and George Strother Gaines, who established the White Bluff Association to purchase, organize, and market the town of Demopolis, Alabama.

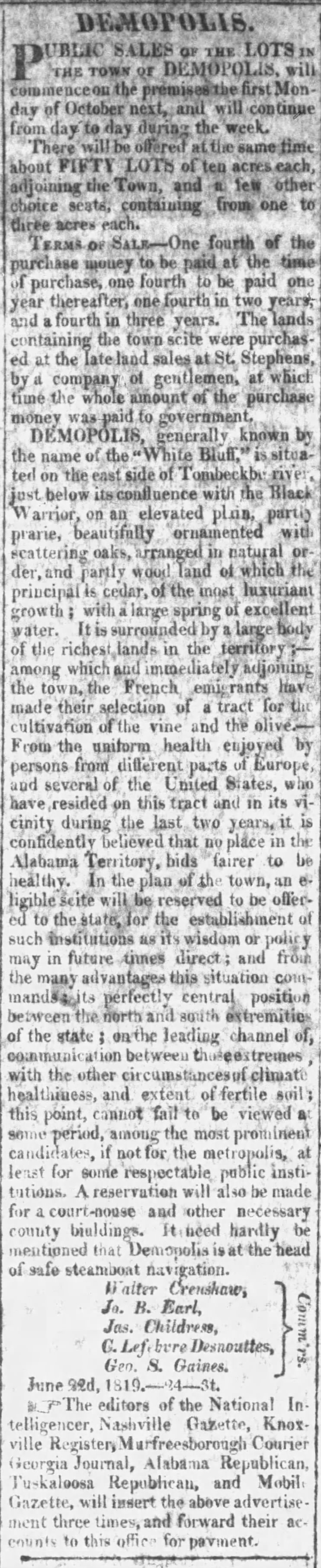
"Demopolis" Nashville Republican, October 13, 1819

Ruins of the Tuscaloosa state capitol building at Childress Hill; the building had been converted to a school after the legislature left in 1846 and burned down in 1923

The capital of Alabama at Tuscaloosa was built in the late 1820s on land that had been sold to the state by J. W. Lane, Samuel Maverick, and James Childress. Childress owned two of the four lots sold, and he had built a "cottage" (log cabin) on property, so the spot was known as Childress Hill. Childress was said to be a good shot with a rifle and storytellers claimed he would "shoot down wild deer as they ran through his grounds." In December 1819 he shot an 7 ft 4 in (2.24 m) female alligator on the river bank 3 miles (4.8 km) below the village; the head was preserved for display.

Childress later moved across town "about a quarter of a mile west of the University; and there built a commodious cottage, in which he resided up to the time of his death, 1836." His homesite was "where Read Street is now located extending from Caplewood Drive to University Avenue on both sides of Read Street." The house was constructed around 1822, and Andrew Jackson was reportedly "spent several days" at this house while visiting in the vicinity of Alabama that same year. The house was "the second frame building in Tuscaloosa, and quite a pretentious establishment in those days." This house still stood as of 1880, when it was the residence of John Brahan Read. Childress lived in town, but also "owned and cultivated one plantation on the Warrior river, six miles from town, and another near Arcola, in Greene County," and was considered a wealthy man. Childress served as commissioner for roads and revenue for Tuscaloosa from 1822 to 1824.

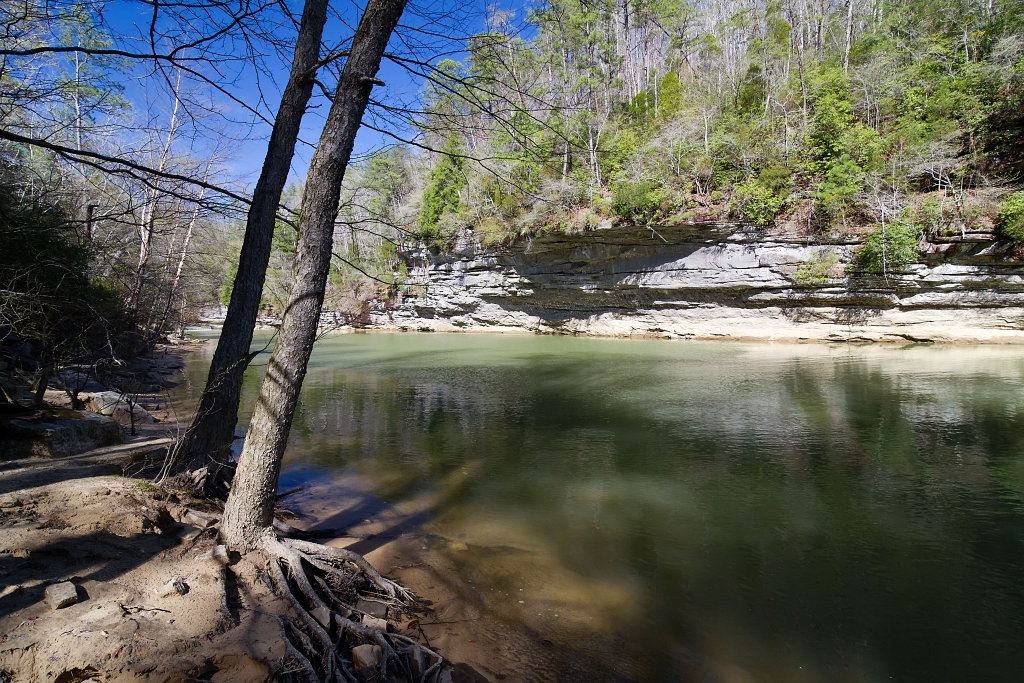
Clear Creek in what is now William B. Bankhead National Forest

At some point, perhaps in the 1820s, Childress was also involved in hunt for a gang of counterfeiters led by John Davis; they were tracked to a cave behind a waterfall on Clear Creek north of Tuscaloosa and there was found "quantities of paper counterfeits on the North and South Carolina and Georgia banks, tools and implements for engraving bills, and dies for casting counterfeit coin of all denominations, and a quantity of poorly executed counterfeit metal dollars, half-dollars, quarters, and dimes." In 1831 Major Childress donated a "pair of large hawks" to the University of Alabama Libraries natural history collection.

The Childresses socialized with Sarah Haynsworth Gayle and her husband, Governor of Alabama John Gayle and thus are mentioned in passing throughout Sarah Gayle's acclaimed diary. The longest passage about James Childress appears in May 1833, following one of the several missing pages and passages that "have been carefully sliced out, as if cut with a knife." The passage thus begins narration mid-scandal without crucial preceding context, but the text seems to be describing Erasmus Walker, husband of Ann Childress, who was the oldest daughter of James and Mary (Phifer) Childress:

...of honorable usefulness at the gaming table. What a base infatuation, and how fatal! it is said that his conduct has been attended by circumstances peculiarly base—no less than the appropriating of money not his own, to this disgraceful purpose. he appears to be deeply affected—greatly depressed, and has no apparent intention of concealing what he has done, tho' that he well knows is impossible now. He told Mr. Gayle & asked him what he must do; and sent for Mr. Riggs to make a statement of the whole affair. Mr. R. says his wife looked greatly distressed, her eyes being red and swollen with weeping; and <Walker> himself talking and crying by turns. I am very, very sorry for her and for him, especially because the world will hardly give him the credit for honesty which he really deserves, in the confession he has made; and that will be dreadfully humiliating & galling, even tho' he may be a sincere penitent. But what power has this scoffing world to render more bitter the cup presented to the poor wife by a husband's hand? None—she looks not alone to the disgrace he has incurr'd as a man, and a member of society, but her woman's heart is bursting to think his love for her was all too feeble to save him from vice, and that his confidence never had been hers. She will be the martyr—he may rise again, from a long & painful probation, to the station he has sunk from, but she will never be able to forget how impotent affected [affection] was to save. Some one told me old <majr. Childress> followed the same trade when he was young. He was successful, I suppose, as his circumstances are very independent, and one might in his case, have demanded proof of vice being displeasing to Deity. His punishment is coming upon him in his old age, in its sorest form, and his most vulnerable part—thro' his children. his son is incorrigibly dissipated in every way—a most unblushing libertine, a drunkard & a gambler—one daughter, a fine woman, lived a miserable life with a brute of a husband <John Pickens>, and died a shocking death—another became the mother of more than one illegitimate child, whose fathers were her brother-in-law, and the husband of her aunt; and now this other child sees the parent of her three infant children, and the husband of her love sacrificed to a demoniac passion for play. God comfort her in her grief, for human aid fails. I feel inclined to see her, but she might possibly misunderstand my visit; and I would be sorry to have her do that.

In regard to the gaming table mentioned by Gayle, "During the sessions of the Alabama Legislature many of the gamblers of Shakespere Row closed their resorts in Mobile and went to Tuscaloosa, capital of the state from 1826 to 1847. There they opened Faro snaps and set up Roulette wheels for the convenience of the lawmakers, who were noted for the reckless manner in which they gambled and the ease with which they could be victimized by crooked dealing boxes, strippers and magnetized Roulette wheels."

In 1833, Thomas McCargo, an interstate slave trader of note, placed an advertisement addressed to James Childress that stated "Take notice, that on Monday the 22d day of April next, at the Tavern house of Jackson & Medley, at Halifax Court-house, Virginia, I shall take the depositions of William Bailey, Nathan Penick and others, to be read as evidence in a suit in Chancery, depending in the United States' Court, Fifth Circuit and Eastern District of Virginia, in which you are plaintiff, and myself and William Frame, Samuel McKinney, William Webb, Henry Terry, and Thomas B. Childress are defendants: and, if from any cause the depositions of all the witnesses. cannot be taken on that day, I shall continue from day to day, until they be all taken." Thomas B. Childress was one of Childress' sons from his first marriage.

Childress was described as an "educated gentleman of cultivated literary taste and polished manners; he was noted for his amiable hospitality, and for the great care he bestowed on the education of his children." Childress died at home in Tuscaloosa in January 1836. The cause of death was "concussion of the brain, produced by an injury received on board the Steam Boat Hunter, on her way to Mobile." According to his obituary in the Tuscaloosa Flag of the Union newspaper, "The deceased was one of the earliest settlers of this place, and possessing naturally great energy and perseverance of character, was always among the first in advocating and executing plans of public improvement and utility...During the last four years of his life, Maj. Childress was a professor of the christian religion, and the change in his character and habits, was such as to excite the notice and remark of those who knew him."

His widow Mary Phifer Crawford Childress died in 1860. The couple had several children together. Three girls died in infancy. At least three others survived to adulthood and became prominent citizens of Alabama.

== See also ==
- Timeline of Tuscaloosa, Alabama
- List of District of Columbia slave traders
- Alabama real estate bubble of the 1810s

== Sources ==
- Anderson, James A. (1940). "Biography of Major James Childress". University of Alabama Digital Collections.
- Gayle, Sarah Ann Haynesworth (2013). Truss, Ruth Smith; Wiggins, Sarah Woolfolk (eds.). The Journal of Sarah Haynsworth Gayle, 1827–1835: A Substitute for Social Intercourse. Tuscaloosa: Published in Cooperation with the University Libraries, the University of Alabama, with further financial support from the Library Leadership Board, the University Libraries, the University of Alabama. ISBN 978-0-8173-8716-7.
- McCorvey, Thomas Chalmers (1960). Alabama Historical Sketches. Charlottesville: University of Virginia Press. ISBN 978-0-18-390377-0. LCCN 60016695. OCLC 579167333.
- Pate, James P., ed. (1998). "Editor's Introduction". The Reminiscences of George Strother Gaines: Pioneer and Statesman of Early Alabama and Mississippi, 1805–1843. Library of Alabama Classics. Tuscaloosa, Alabama: University of Alabama Press. ISBN 978-0-8173-0897-1. LCCN 97007084. OCLC 45730145. Project MUSE book 35918.
- Owen, Thomas M.; Owen, Marie (Bankhead) (1921). History of Alabama and Dictionary of Alabama Biography. Vol. IV. Chicago: The S. J. Clarke Publishing Co. LCCN 21018194. OCLC 1872130.
- Phifer, Charles Henry; Phifer, Robert Smith; Wilson, George Edward (1910). Genealogy and History of the Phifer Family. Charlotte, North Carolina: Presbyterian Standard Publishing Company. LCCN 23001897. OCLC 9725121. OL 6651644M. FHL 3288443 – via North Carolina Digital Collections.
- Roberts, Frances C.; Reidy, Thomas E. (2019). The Founding of Alabama: Background and Formative Period in the Great Bend and Madison County. Tuscaloosa: The University of Alabama Press. ISBN 978-0-8173-2043-0. LCCN 2019018459. OCLC 1133266247. Project MUSE book 72323.
- Smith, William Russell (1889). Reminiscences of a Long Life: Historical, Political, Personal and Literary. W.R. Smith Sr. LCCN 14014649. OCLC 1573956.
- Weaver, Herbert; Bergeron, Paul H., eds. (1972). Correspondence of James K. Polk: Volume II, 1833–1834. Nashville: Vanderbilt University Press. ISBN 0-8265-1176-7.
