= George Kephart =

American slave trader (1811–1888)

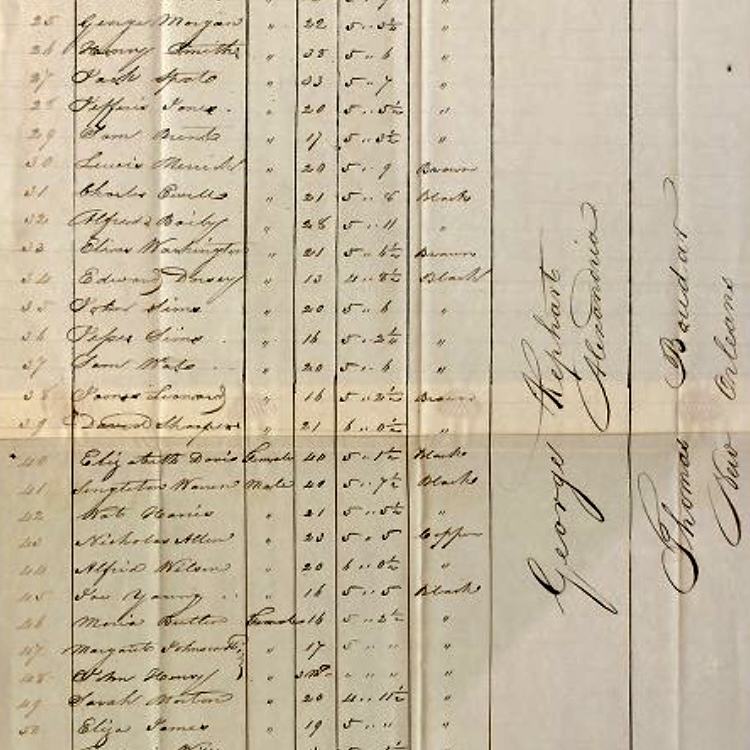
- Partial manifest of the brig Angora, sailing in 1841 (New-York Historical Society Slavery Collection)
- Born: February 7, 1811; Maryland, U.S.
- Died: August 26, 1888 (aged 77); Maryland, U.S.
- Other name: Geo. Kephart
- Occupations: American slave trader, landlord

George Kephart (February 7, 1811 – August 26, 1888) was a 19th-century American slave trader, land owner, farmer, and philanthropist. A native of Maryland, he was an agent of the interstate trading firm Franklin & Armfield early in his career, and later occupied, owned, and finally leased out that company's infamous slave jail in Alexandria (originally District of Columbia, after March 13, 1847, Alexandria, Virginia). In 1862, Henry Wilson of Massachusetts mentioned Kephart by name in a speech on the floor of the U.S. Senate as one of the traders who had "polluted the capital of the nation with this brutalizing traffic" of selling people.

== Biography ==
=== Early life and family ===
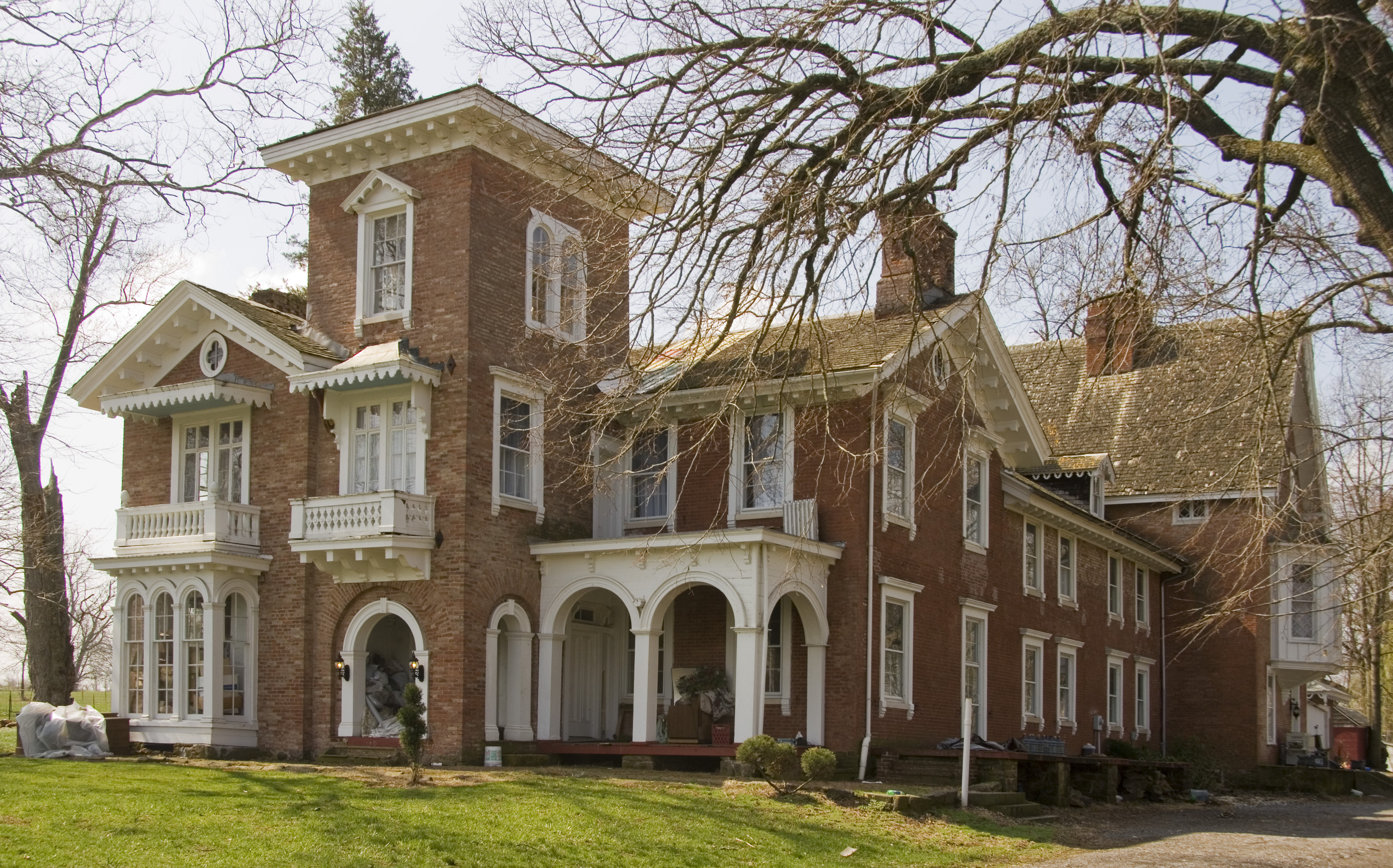
Trevanion in April 2009

Kephart was born in what was then Frederick County, Maryland (later Carroll County), most likely on his parents' farm, which was then known was Brick Mills, and was renamed Trevanion by a subsequent owner. Brick Mills was named for its large brick gristmill that used Big Pipe Creek for water power. Other outbuildings constructed in the Kephart era included a still house built by David Kephart II, George Kephart's father. George Kephart had a number of siblings who survived to adulthood, including Philip Kephart, who became a doctor and settled in Berrien Springs, Michigan, and Peter Kephart, who engineered and marketed home refrigeration appliances. On his mother's side, Kephart was a Reister, and he lived out his later life in Reistertown, Baltimore, which was founded by an ancestor. The family were of the Lutheran Protestant faith and Kephart's parents and grandfather were buried in the community's Lutheran cemetery. Kephart inherited Brick Mills after his father's death in 1836.

=== Slave trading (c. 1827–1852) ===
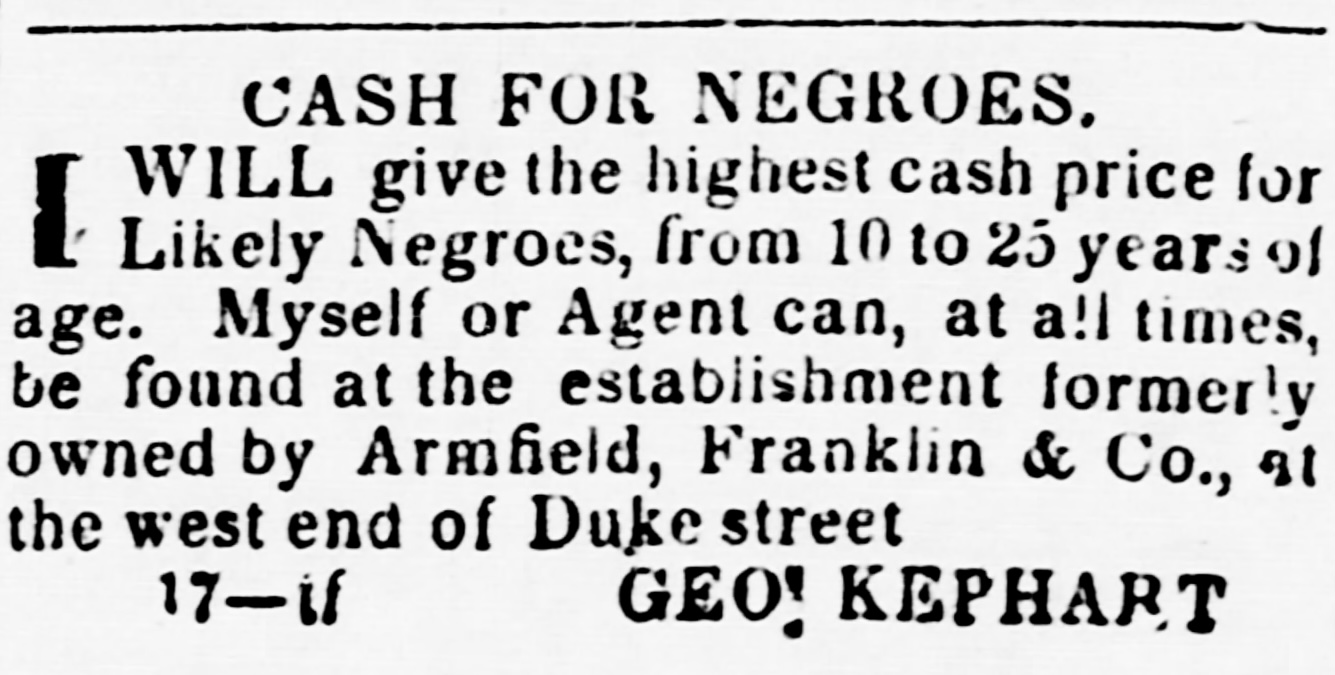
"Cash for Negroes - Geo. Kephart" Alexandria Gazette, February 8, 1838

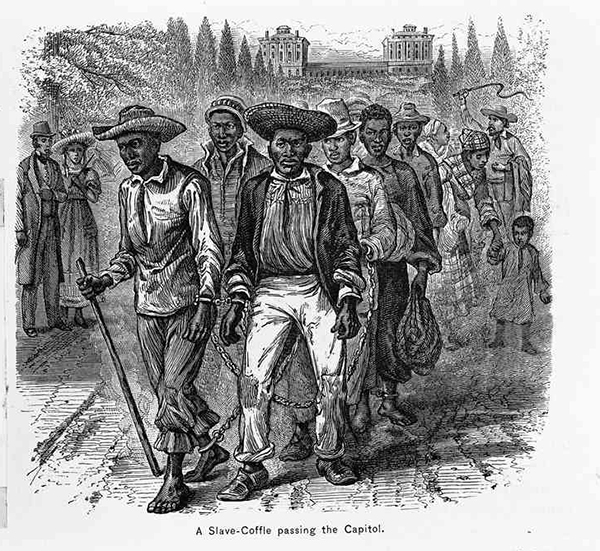
Illustration of a coffle, a group of enslaved people collected and chained to be trafficked south on overland footpaths, passing the U.S. Capitol, pictured under construction c. 1825–1830

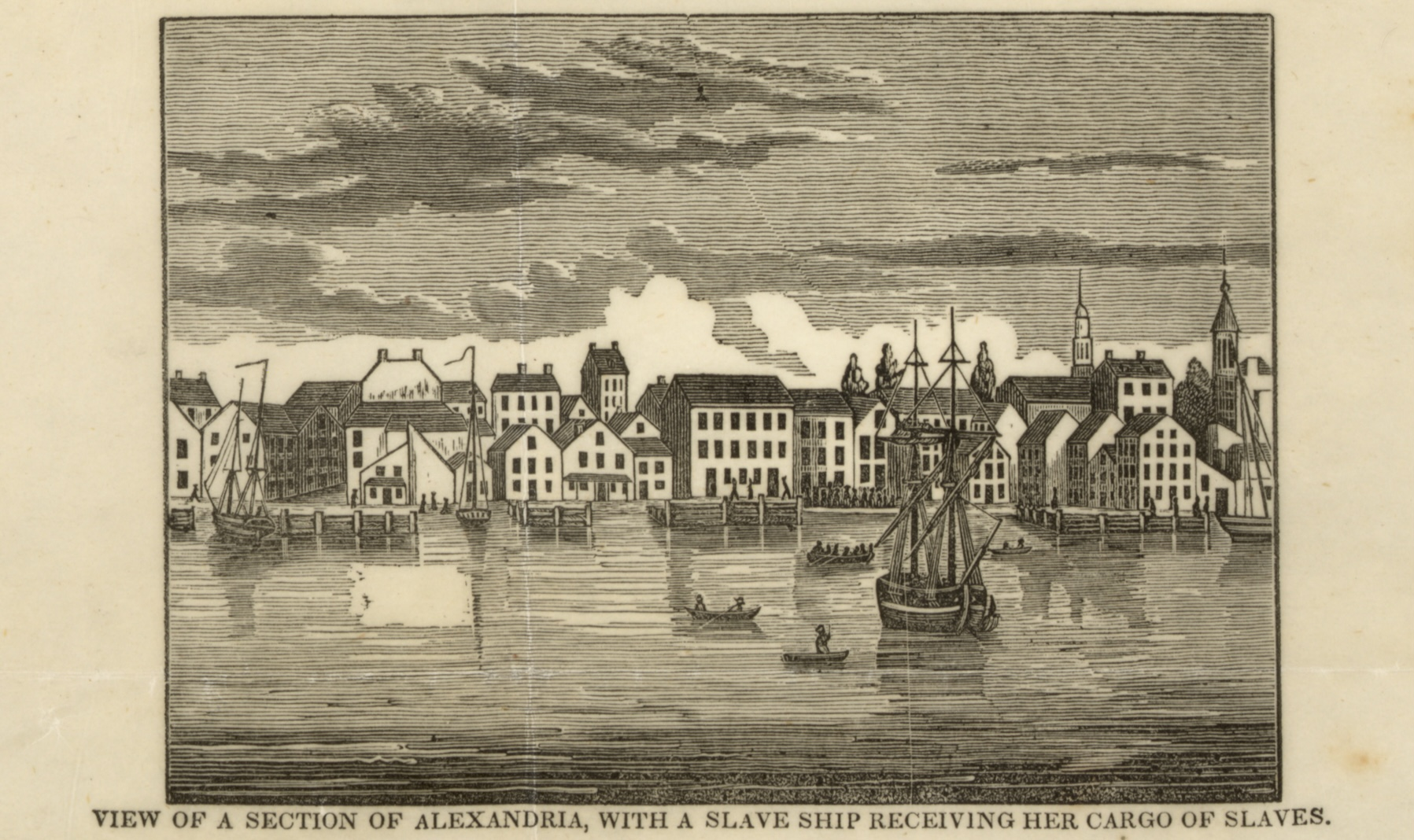
Franklin & Armfield relied on coastwise ships for transport, which were faster and more predictable than using coffles; etching of Alexandria harbor produced in 1836 for the American Anti-Slavery Society

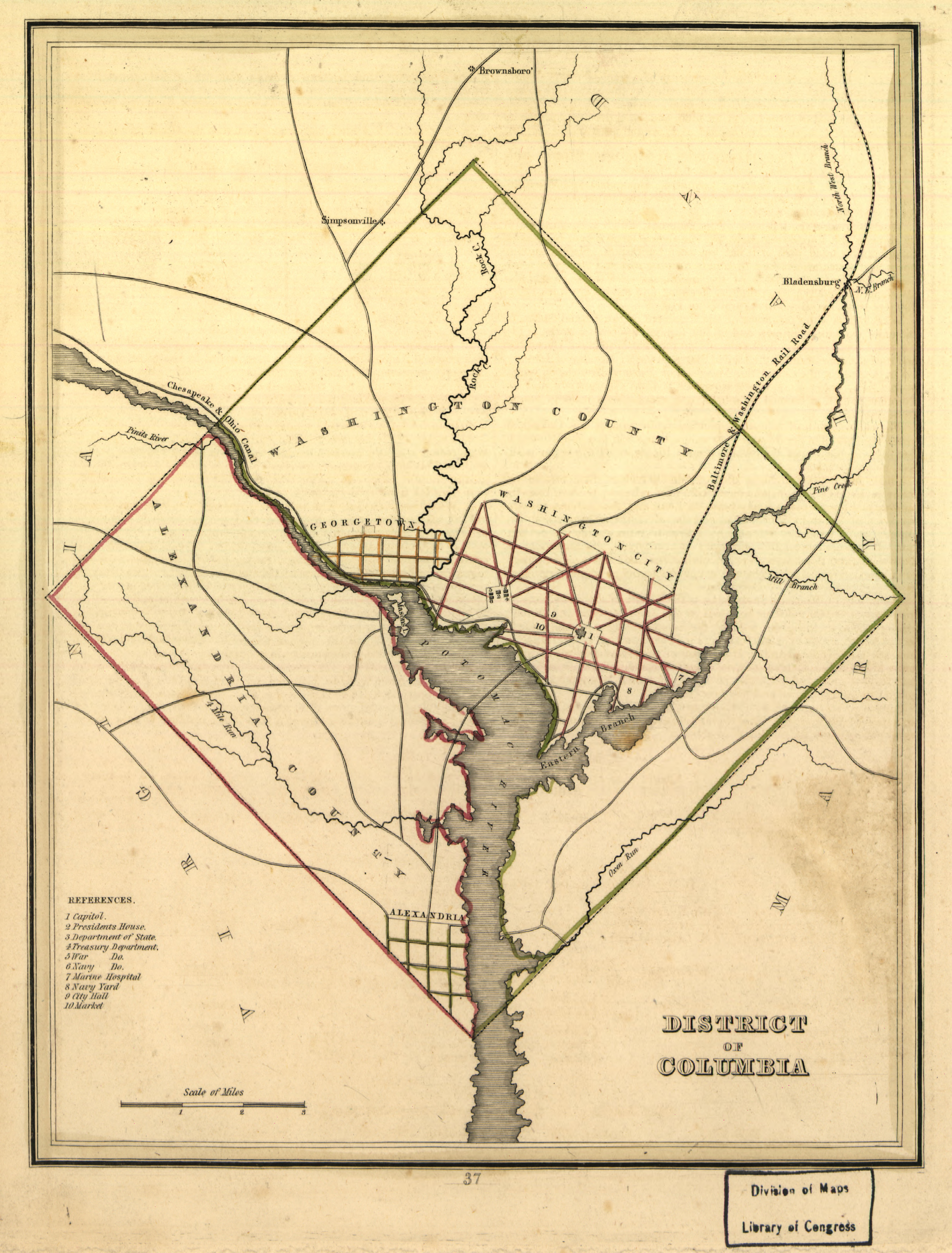
Map of the District of Columbia in 1835, prior to the retrocession of Alexandria to Virginia

Kephart may have been trading as early as 1827, when he was just 16, buying locally and selling in New Orleans and Natchez, Mississippi. Historian Frederic Bancroft introduced Kephart in Slave-Trading in the Old South with the description "Early in the 'thirties a small trader, living near a little ferry on the upper Potomac, was searching for slaves throughout Montgomery and Frederick counties, Maryland. He knew all the country roads, the names and the financial condition of most of the slaveholders. He was regularly at certain taverns and stores in Fredericktown and Bockville to get letters from or to meet persons that had been attracted by reports of his liberal offers. And he promptly inspected all proffered slaves." Per the Negro History Bulletin, Kephart and his regional compatriots were the right men at the right place at the right time for the job the abolitionists called soul-driving: "Because Alexandria was the best point from which to start both coast-wise shipments and overland coffles, large numbers of slaves passed through Washington from Maryland to Alexandria. In 1827 Benjamin Lundy wrote: 'It is my decided opinion that were we to search the globe from Kamchatka to the southern pole, we could not find a people more tyrannical, more completely lost to feelings of humanity and justice, than the heartless wretches who carry on the United States slave trade through Maryland and the District of Columbia.'"

There is reason to believe that Kephart had one or more slave prisons on his own Maryland farm: (Note: For another case of a slave trader putting a slave jail in their house, see James McMillin of Kentucky.)

- In 1837, shortly after he inherited Brick Mills from his father, George Kephart listed it for sale (per the ad, enslaved people would have been accepted as a form of payment). Per Benjamin Skolnik's history of the Alexandria slave jail located at 1315 Duke Street, "[Kephart] also notes that the new dwelling house is 'completely finished to the garret, with a basement story for servants'. Reading between the lines here, it would appear that Kephart, the slave trader, may have been using this basement to confine enslaved people on his property prior to trafficking them for Franklin & Armfield."
- An 1886 newspaper column about Trevanion, from an ongoing series about the history and architecture of local buildings reported that, "Some distance from the rear of the mansion stands a brick one-story building, with attic lighted by dormer windows. It was used as a poultry house, but was formerly probably occupied by domestics. In the dormitory of this building [later occupant] Mr. Dallas kept, through the winter, a large number of partridges, which he fed until the return of pleasant weather in spring, when he set them at liberty upon the estate." In this context domestics is a euphemism for slaves; and a one-story building with high windows that let in a modicum of light and air but prevent anyone from looking in or out matches, for example, Henrietta Wood's description of Lewis Robards' slave jail in Kentucky. However, the building may also have simply had an agricultural-domestic purpose, as a recent house history reports about the Trevanion property, "At some point Peter [Kephart], youngest of David's children, constructed a cellar with an overlying icehouse on the property where he experimented with refrigeration techniques."
- A 1928 history of Carroll County must be treated with some skepticism (as it grants, for example, to George Kephart two Confederate-martyr-soldier sons he did not have). Nonetheless, it was written by a long-time resident of the area who said: "George Kephart was a Southern gentleman of the old school lived near Licksville, on the farm now owned by the Thomas Brothers, where George S. Allnutt once lived. Mr. Kephart owned a large number of slaves and entertained royally. My mother who often visited his home spoke highly of his hospitality...Mr. Kephart was probably the largest slavedealer in the county. He had two underground jails built where he kept the unruly, as well as a brick jail above ground."

Circa 1834 Kephart was hired on as one of five agents (along with Rice C. Ballard, James F. Purvis, Jourdan Saunders, and Thomas M. Jones) who worked full-time collecting enslaved people from throughout the greater Chesapeake region for Franklin & Armfield to ship south. After Franklin and Armfield sold out of the slave trade in the mid-1830s, Kephart built on their existing business network as well as expanding in new directions, allying with traders including Purvis and his brother Isaac F. Purvis, Hope Hull Slatter, Bacon Tait, Thomas Boudar, Sidnum Grady, and James H. Birch.

Between 1837 and 1846 he leased, and between March 12, 1846, and 1859 he owned, the Alexandria, Virginia slave pen originally used by Franklin & Armfield that is now known as the Freedom House Museum, located at 1315 Duke Street. In the early 1840s he seems to have been in a legal partnership with Tait of Richmond and Boudar of New Orleans. Observers and visitors to the prison typically found about 50 people imprisoned there, but one source claims there was capacity for up to 300 enslaved people. In 1841, a visitor was informed that Kephart annually shipped 1,500 to 2,000 people south. According to the author of The Ledger and the Chain (2021), these numbers are likely exaggerated. Kephart was most likely operating the 1315 Duke Street slave jail at the time Dorcas Allen killed her children there in 1837. Similarly, Kephart's jail was used as a transfer point for people trafficked in the 1838 Jesuit slave sale, such as a man named Charles Queen, and a woman named Anny and her children Arnold and Louisa. Charles Queen was shipped south on the Isaac Franklin, a brig that Kephart had purchased from Franklin and Armfield.

In 1846 Kephart and Virginia-based trader Joseph Bruin went to chancery court against each other in Fairfax County, Virginia; the case file mentions over 100 different enslaved people. In 1847, the section of the District of Columbia that was south of the Potomac River was retroceded to Virginia; the Compromise of 1850 abolished the slave trade in the District, but Kephart and his agents and clients would have been unbothered by these changes—it was a short trip over the river and back for anyone who wished to buy or sell slaves. In 1851 the abolitionist William Goodell wrote that the slave trade's "general prosecution may be seen by the numerous advertisements of both purchasers and venders, in the most respectable newspapers in the slave states" and included an undated Kephart ad from the Alexandria Gazette seeking to acquire "likely Negroes, from 10 to 25 years of age". Also in 1851, The Liberator surmised that Kephart mentioned in a letter about taking advantage of the Fugitive Slave Act to enrich their "inventory" was the same man who was involved in the attempted recapture of fugitive slave Shadrach Minkins; however, The Liberator was incorrect—the slave catcher in the Minkins case was one John Caphart of Norfolk, Virginia.

Kephart claimed to have quit slave trading in June 1852. However, he remained owner of the slave pen, renting it to other slave traders. He was also an investor or silent partner in the successor business, Price, Birch & Co. for the first year (c. 1858–59) it was operating at Duke Street. Kephart sold the building in 1859, it was operated as a slave jail by Price & Cook for a time, and finally it was captured and liberated by the U.S. Army on or around May 24, 1861.

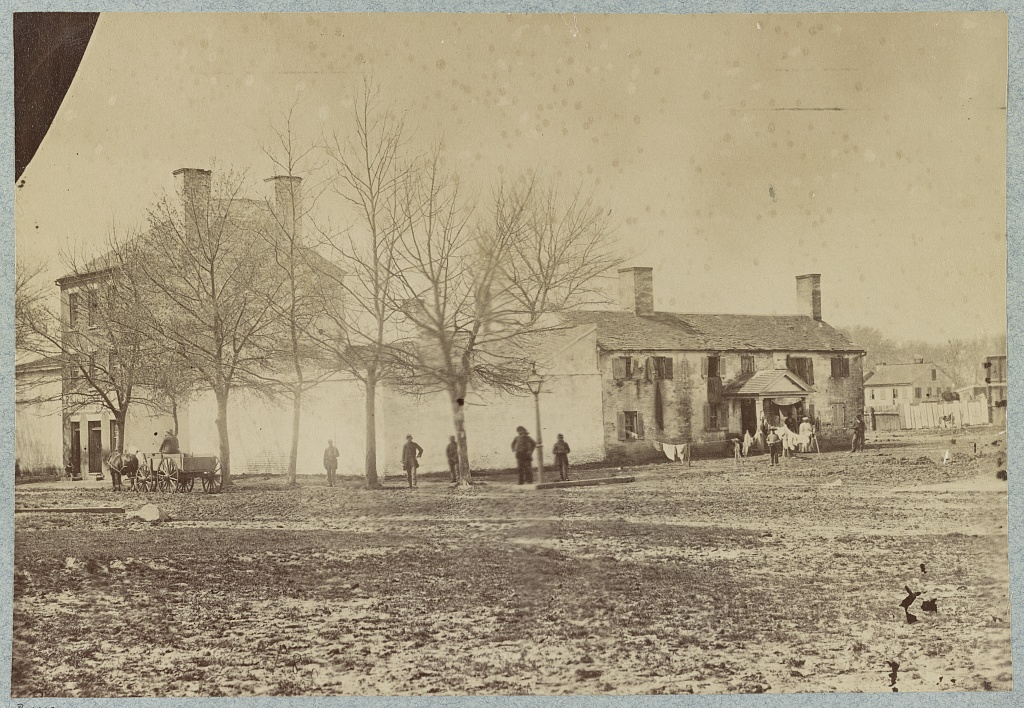
Per the Negro History Bulletin, this wide view of 1315 Duke Street shows the trading offices on the left, the high-walled yard in the center, and the "sleeping quarters of the slaves" on the right; only the offices remain standing today

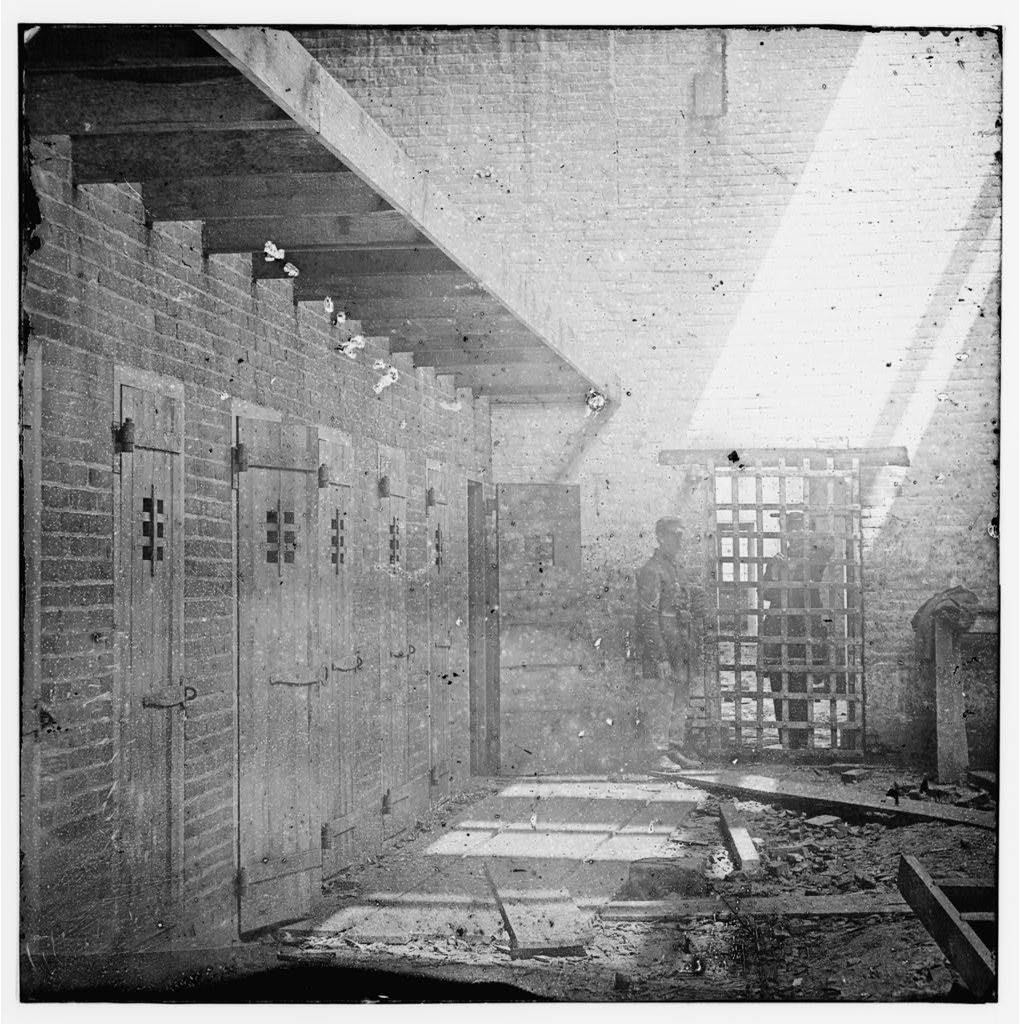
Jailblock within the 1315 Duke Street complex; both photos date to the Civil War era

In the 1920s, a local historian named William Jarboe Grove, whose parents had socialized with the Kepharts, rationalized George Kephart's slave-trading career with period-typical patriarchal canards: "Mr. Kephart although a slave dealer was a man with a kind heart and treated his slaves well, as long as they were in his hands, and they would conduct themselves properly as it was also to his interest to take good care of them as they were valuable property and he could not afford to mistreat them." On other hand, Fred Fowler, who was born enslaved in Frederick County, Maryland, escaped with assistance from the Underground Railroad, served in the U.S. Colored Troops, and who was employed at the Library of Congress from 1876 to 1919, told Frederic Bancroft, "Ever'body in Frederick knowed Kephart, an' was afeerd of 'im, too. When it was reported that he was about, they trembled. At different times, two years apart, he bought my uncle Lloyd Stewart and my aunt Margaret Stewart. He was supposed to have sent 'em to Georgia, but they was nevah heerd from."

=== American Civil War and later life ===
In 1860, George Kephart or someone in Baltimore with the same name was arrested for assaulting a black man: "George Kephart was yesterday arrested by policeman McCullough for disorderly conduct and committing an assault on Richard Dorsey, colored. The difficulty arose about a wagon, belonging to the colored man, standing in the street, which the accused wanted to pass."

In 1862 U.S. Senator Henry Wilson denounced Kephart as a key slave trader of the District of Columbia in a speech on the floor of the U.S. Senate:

In 1830, the Washington Spectator indignantly denounced these "processions so often seen in the streets of Washington, of human beings handcuffed in pairs, or chained in couples," wending their way to the slave ships which were to bear them to the distant South. Yet this traffic, denounced by Judges and Grand Juries, citizens and presses, was legalized in 1831 by the Corporation of the City of Washington; and Williams, Birch, (Note: Believe it or not, there were two slave traders named Williams and two slave traders named Birch operating in the Washington area to whom Wilson may be referring: Thomas Williams or his brother William H. Williams, and James R. Birch, not to be confused with William Birch.) Neal, Kephart, Richards, Franklin, and Armfield, polluted the capital of the nation with this brutalizing traffic, under the sanction of law, until it was made illegal by the legislation of 1850."

Moncure Daniel Conway's Testimonies Concerning Slavery devoted a chapter called "The Slave Harvest — Mysteries of a Shamble" to George Kephart and his jail. Per Conway, "Ever since I can remember, the chief slave-dealing firm in [Virginia], and perhaps any where along the border between the Free and Slave States. Every slave that tries to escape to a Free State was invariably sold if caught, and generally lodged in Kephart's shamble, and never suffered to return to the place from which he ran, lest he should tell others the means of his escape." The bulk of the chapter is devoted to quoting from letters removed from the jail when it was captured by U.S. troops at the beginning of the American Civil War. One elderly man was left behind; per Conway the shackles that bound him were removed and sent to Henry Ward Beecher as a sort of memento of the success of the abolition movement in the United States. The captured letters dated from 1837 to 1857 and included correspondence from a number of affiliates including the usual suspects, Brashear of Natchez (Note: Possibly Robert B. Brashear, dealer at the Forks of the Road, or some relation of Turner Brashear of Brashear's Stand on the Natchez Trace.), one Mr. Sims, (Note: Sims is possibly a mistranscription; Kephart was known to work with a Thomas Sinn who "who sold slaves all over the far South, many of whom had run away from their masters and afterwards captured, were sold, others were convicted of crime and were sold into slavery for a certain number of years.") and others.

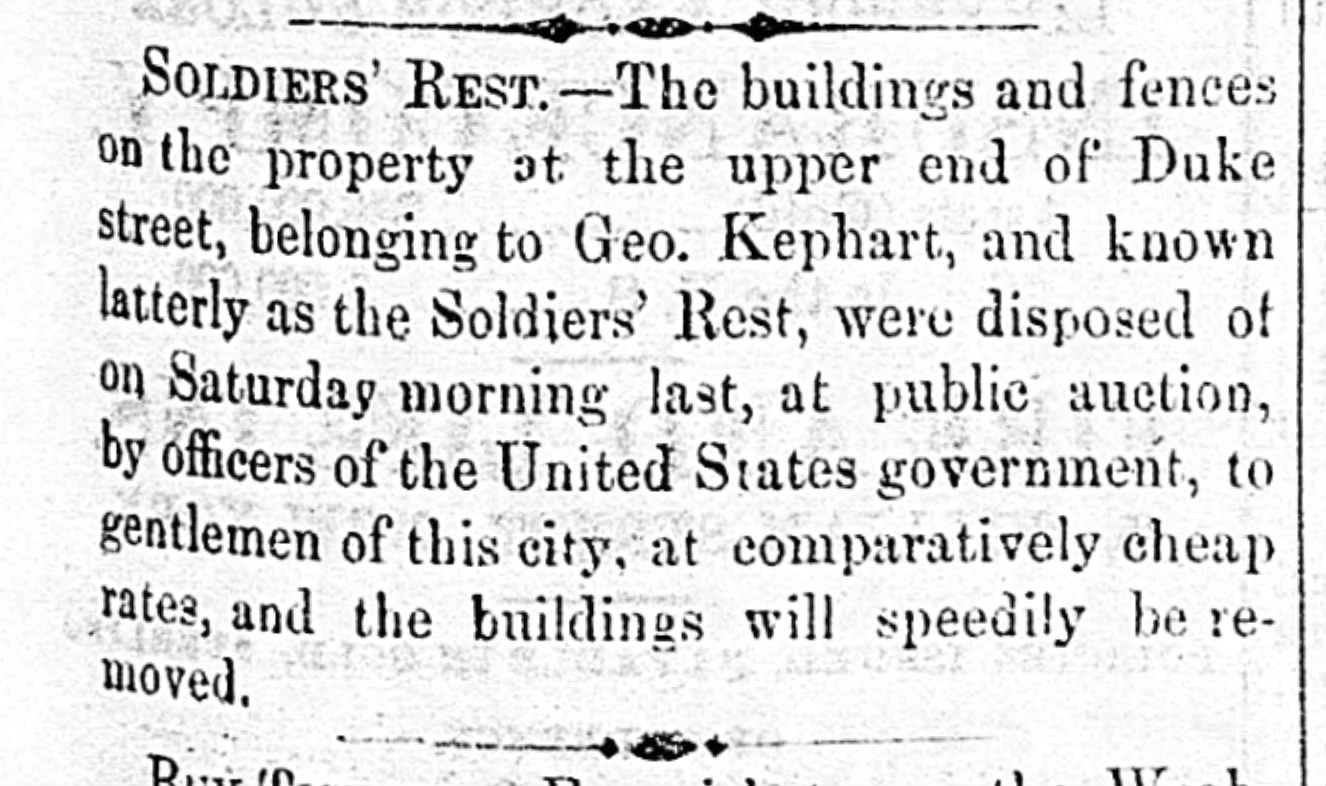
"Soldiers' Rest" Alexandria Gazette, November 12, 1866

In 1867 George Kephart donated "½ acre of land to the Methodist Episcopal Church of Baltimore County to erect a school house for colored children and a cemetery to bury the dead. This school in 1872 became part of the Black Public School System of Baltimore County and was designated Reisterstown School for Colored Children number 22."

At the time of the 1870 and 1880 censuses, Kephart was living in Baltimore, sharing a household with his widowed sisters, who kept house, and his nieces. Kephart died in 1888 after multiple strokes. He had been living with his sister and was described in an obituary as a "bachelor of sociable tastes". In his obituary he was described as having been a prosperous farmer, there was no mention of his past career as a slave trader.

== Legacy ==
The American poet and abolitionist John Greenleaf Whittier visited three slave jails in the District of Columbia in 1841, including the one at 1315 Duke Street. He later wrote a poem called "At Washington" that was subtitled "Lines, Suggested by a visit to the City of Washington, in the 12th month of 1845", and which historians suggest may have influenced by his visit to the slave jail owned at that time by Kephart.

From this glittering lie my vision Takes a broader, sadder range,
Full before me have arisen
Other pictures dark and strange;
From the parlor to the prison must
the scene and witness change Hark!

The heavy gate is swinging
On its hinges, harsh and slow;
One pale prison lamp is flinging
On a fearful group below
Such a light as leaves to terror
whatsoe'er it does not show.

Pitying God!—Is that a WOMAN
On whose wrist the shackles clash?
Is that shriek she utters human, Underneath the stinging lash?
Are they MEN whose eyes of madness
from that sad procession flash?

Still the dance goes gayly onward! What is it to Wealth and Pride
That without the stars are looking
On a scene which earth should hide? That the SLAVE-SHIP lies in waiting,
rocking on Potomac's tide!

Four documents from Kephart's slave-trading business, including the bill of sale for an enslaved woman, are in the collection of the New Jersey Historical Society. In 2021, the Kephart Bridge Landing in Loudoun County, Virginia, was nominated for renaming, as the existing name commemorated a major slave trader. Kephart "owned land along Goose Creek crucial to his business of transporting the enslaved from port to port." In 2022 the landing was renamed Riverpoint Drive Trailhead.

== See also ==
- List of American slave traders
- Slave markets and slave jails in the United States
- History of slavery in the District of Columbia
- History of slavery in Virginia
- History of slavery in Maryland
