= James H. Birch (slave trader) =

American slave trader (1803–1870)

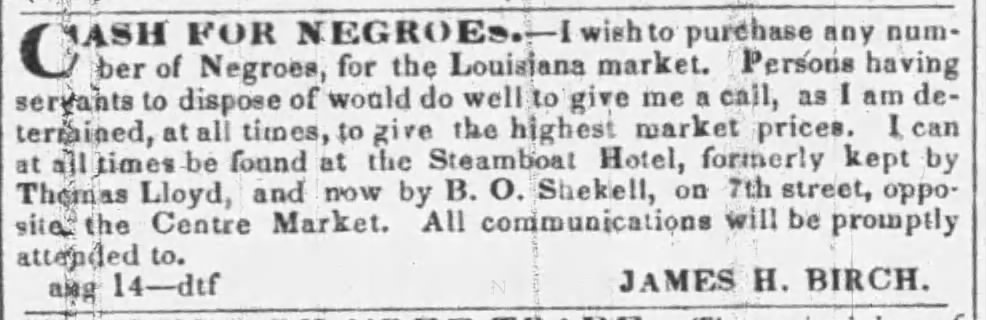
- Birch advertisement, published December 19, 1840, the winter before Solomon Northup was kidnapped, offering "cash for negroes" to be resold to the "Louisiana market"
- Born: October 3, 1803; Virginia, United States
- Died: December 20, 1870 (aged 67); Washington, District of Columbia, U.S.
- Burial place: Congressional Cemetery, Washington, D.C.
- Other names: Burch
- Occupations: Slave trader, hotel operator, municipal manager
- Known for: Slave trading in the capital city of the United States, 1830s–1840s

James H. Birch (October 3, 1803 – December 20, 1870) was an American slave trader in the District of Columbia. He was most active as a trader in the 1830s and 1840s and was infamously involved in the imprisonment of Dorcas Allen and Solomon Northup. He later became involved in municipal maintenance governance, and the Washington city watch, and was involved in running Potomac-region hotels and resorts. He died at his home "on the Island" (possibly Mason's Island) at age 67 in 1870 and is buried at the Congressional Cemetery.

== Biography ==
Birch was born in Virginia on October 8, 1803. He was married in Maryland in 1834 to Sarah B. Posey of Washington; by coincidence, the same newspaper column that announced the wedding also announced the marriage of John Armfield to Isaac Franklin's niece Martha Franklin.

In 1834 he was partnered with one Jones in the slave trading business, and their advertisements were noticed in the Liberator abolitionist newspaper: "We will pay the highest price for any number of likely Negroes, from 12 to 25 years of age. As we are at this time permanently settled in the market, we can at all times be found at Mr. Isaac Beers' Tavern, a few doors below Lloyd's Tavern, opposite to the Centre Market, in Washington, D. C., or at Mr. McCandless' Tavern, corner of Bridge and High Street, Georgetown. Persons having servants to dispose of, will find it to their advantage to give us a call." In 1835 he advertised in the Washington Daily National Intelligencer, "CASH FOR 200 NEGROES. Including both sexes, from 12 to 25 years of age. Persons having likely servants to dispose of will find it to their interest to give us a call, as we will give higher prices, in Cash, than any other purchaser who is now in this market. We can at all times be found at Isaac Beers' Tavern, a few doors below Lloyd's Tavern, opposite the Centre Market, Washington City. All commurications promptly attended to JAMES H. BIRCH." In 1836 he advertised for "400 negroes" and could be found at "the Mechanics' Hall, now kept by Isaac Sheckle" and formerly keep by Isaac Beers.

In 1837, Dorcas Allen and her four children were put up for sale by her old owner's wife's new husband. While in Birch's "three-story Duke street pen" previously owned by Franklin & Armfield, she killed two of her four children rather than see them sold south. District Attorney Francis Scott Key advised Nathan Allen, husband of Dorcas and father of the children, to raise money to try to buy their freedom. With contributions from figures like John Quincy Adams, it was done and Allen and her children were freed.

In December 1840 Birch advertised, "CASH FOR NEGROES. I wish to purchase any number of Negroes, for the Louisiana market. Persons having servants to dispose of woald do well to give me a call, as l am determined, at all times, to give the highest market prices. I can at all times be found at the Steamboat Hotel, formerly kept by Themas Lloyd, and now by B. O. Shekell, on 7th street, opposite the Centre Market. All communications will be promptly attended to."

Birch was responsible for the kidnapping and selling of Solomon Northup, a free man, in Washington in 1841. Northup wrote a memoir of his time as a slave, Twelve Years a Slave. Birch was tried for the kidnap of Northup; he was acquitted, in part because the law did not allow Northup, a black man, to give evidence. Following his acquittal, Birch demanded charges be filed against Solomon Northup for trying to defraud him, but then withdrew the case.

In 1846, James H. Birch was co-owner of the United States Hotel on Pennsylvania Avenue between 3rd and 4th.

In 1851 and 1852 he advertised Piney Point Pavilion, also known as Potomac Pavilion at Piney Point, as a resort destination. In 1856, Birch was the captain of the auxiliary guard in Washington.

In 1862, Birch's daughter Martha Birch Linton applied to the District of Columbia Compensated Emancipation Program, for eight people, Charlotte Mudd, Henry Geary, Camilia Jones, George P. Mudd, Cornelia Jones, George Jones, Frances Geary & Allice Jones stating in her application: "That your petitioner acquired the claim to the aforesaid service or labor of said Persons in manner following: They were Deeded by my Father James H. Birch to his Wife Sarah B. Birch and at her Death were to be held for the Sole use and benefit of his children I being the only child now living of Sarah B Birch am intitled to the claim, my Trustee—Wm. E. Posey when last herd from was living in Alabamma You will find the Deed Recorded in Libre W. B. Book 65 Page 49."

Birch died December 20, 1870, in Washington. Birch had purchased five burial sites at the Congressional Cemetery in May 1865. He was interred there in range 74, grave 33, in February 1871.

== See also ==
- List of District of Columbia slave traders
- Slave markets and slave jails in the United States
- Jilson Dove – American slave trader (~1783–1853)
