= Slave rebellion and resistance in the United States =

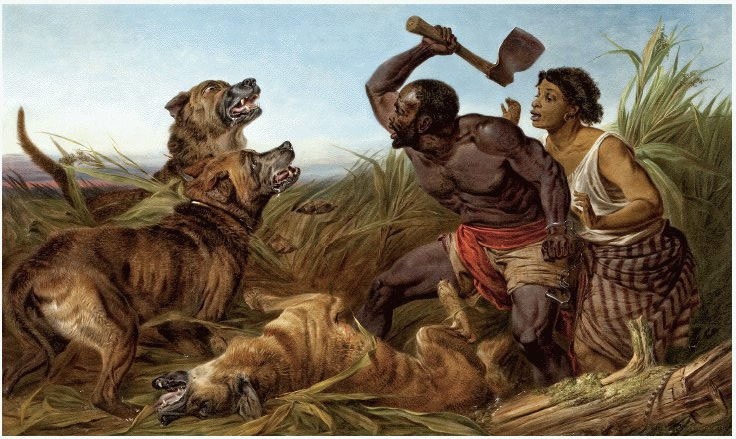
One child survivor of American slavery retold "his parents' stories about slaves sometimes killing the bloodhounds that some whites kept for tracking runaways" (Richard Ansdell, The Hunted Slaves, 1862, National Museum of African American History and Culture)

Slave rebellions and resistance were means of opposing the system of chattel slavery in the United States. There were many ways that most slaves would either openly rebel or quietly resist due to the oppressive systems of slavery. According to Herbert Aptheker, "there were few phases of ante-bellum Southern life and history that were not in some way influenced by the fear of, or the actual outbreak of, militant concerted slave action." Slave rebellions in the United States were small and diffuse compared with those in other slave economies in part due to "the conditions that tipped the balance of power against southern slaves—their numerical disadvantage, their creole composition, their dispersal in relatively small units among resident whites—were precisely the same conditions that limited their communal potential." As such, "Confrontation in the Old South characteristically took the form of an individual slave's open resistance to plantation authorities,"or other individual or small-group actions, such as slaves opportunistically killing slave traders in hopes of avoiding forced migration away from friends and family.

== List of slave rebellions in Colonial America ==
Colonial slave rebellions before 1776, or before 1801 in Louisiana, include:

- San Miguel de Gualdape (1526)
- Gloucester County Conspiracy (1663)
- Bacon's Rebellion (1676)
- New York Slave Revolt of 1712
- Chesapeake rebellion (1730)
- Samba rebellion (1731)
- Stono Rebellion (1739)
- New York Conspiracy of 1741
- Pointe Coupée Conspiracy (1791)
- Pointe Coupée Conspiracy (1795)

== List of slave rebellions in the United States ==
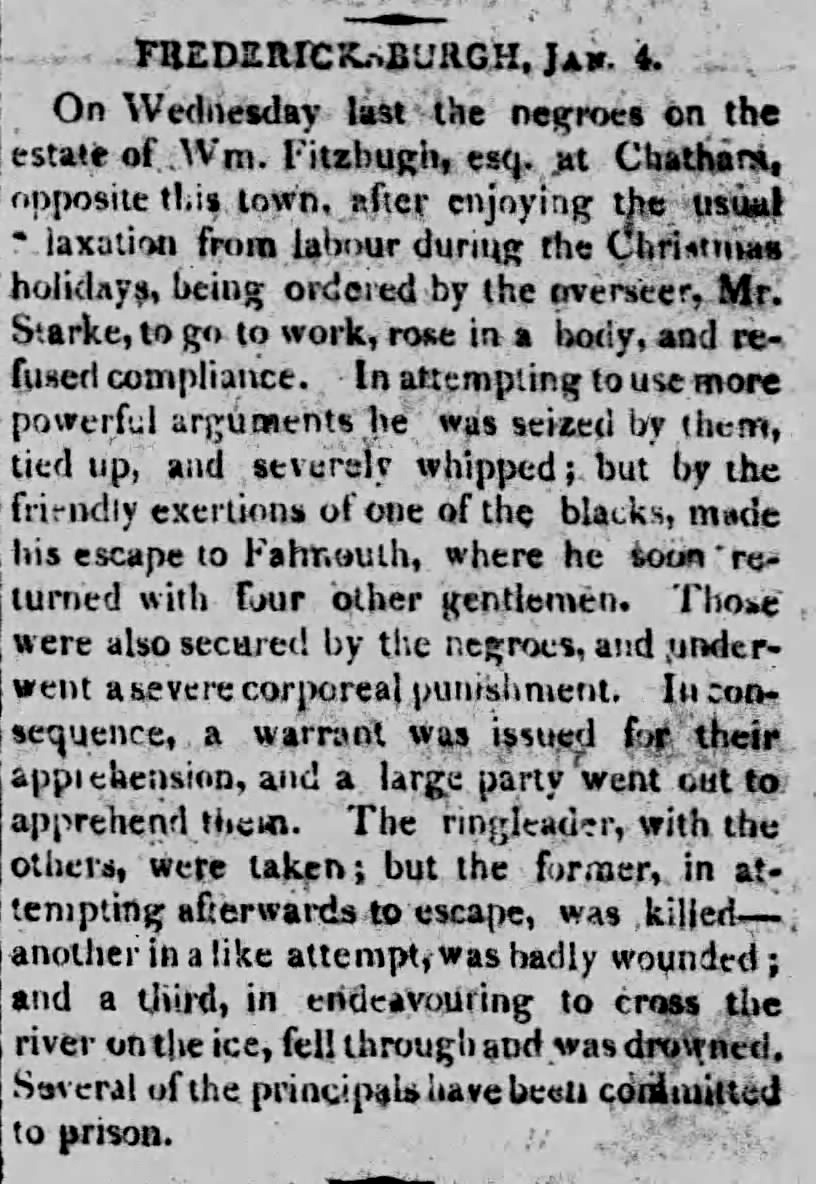
Newspaper report about the Chatham Manor Revolt (Aurora General Advertiser, Philadelphia, January 9, 1805)

Historians in the 20th century identified 250 to 311 slave uprisings in U.S. and colonial history. Those after 1776 include:

- Gabriel's conspiracy (1800)
- Igbo Landing slave escape and mass suicide (1803)
- Chatham Manor Rebellion (1805)
- 1811 German Coast uprising, (1811)
- George Boxley Rebellion (1815)
- Denmark Vesey's conspiracy (1822)
- Nat Turner's Rebellion (1831)
- Black Seminole Slave Rebellion (1835–1838)
- Amistad seizure (1839)
- 1842 Slave Revolt in the Cherokee Nation
- Charleston Workhouse Slave Rebellion (1849)
- Second Creek Slave Conspiracy (1860)

== List of slave-ship mutinies in the United States ==
There are four known mutinies on vessels involved in the coastwise slave trade: Decatur (1826), Governor Strong (1826), Lafayette (1829) from Norfolk to New Orleans, and the Creole (1841).

== List of slave traders killed by their prisoners ==
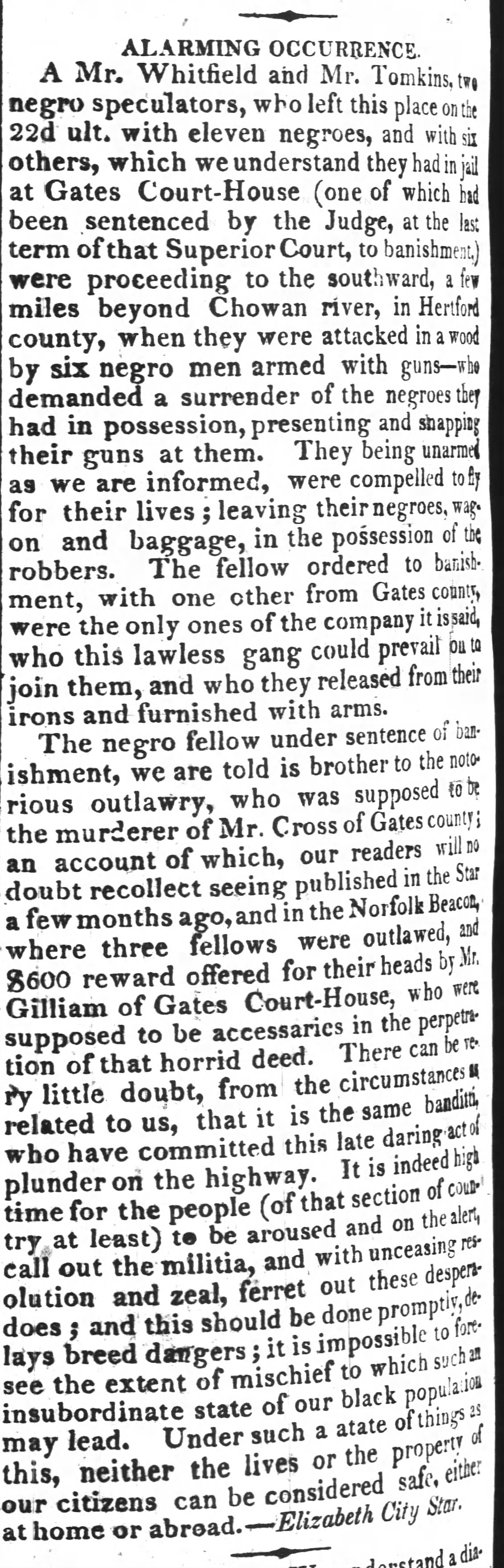
"Alarming Occurrence" Fayetteville Weekly Observer, North Carolina, May 20, 1824

- Speers, Georgia–Virginia, 1799
- Bradley and Nolen, 1817
- Ohio River slave rebellion – Edward Stone, Howard Stone, David Cobb, James Gray, and Davis, "killed midstream on the Ohio River" (1826)
- Jesse and John Kirby (1834)
- Thomas P. Trotter and Richard Bolton
- Greenup, Kentucky coffle revolt (1829)
- A. J. Orr (1855)

== Women and resistance ==
Gender played an imperative role in the treatment of slaves ranging from selling, harassment and expectations. Women showed resistance in different, but significant ways compared to men due to different expectations. For example, there were fewer women who would runaway due to the responsibilities as mothers and primary caretakers of their home.

Religion was utilised by enslaved African American women as a framework for resistance. The Bible was used to critique slavery and the conduct of slaveholders. Knowledge of the Bible allowed for enslaved women to gain social capital and become influential members of their communities by leading prayer meetings.

== Escape ==
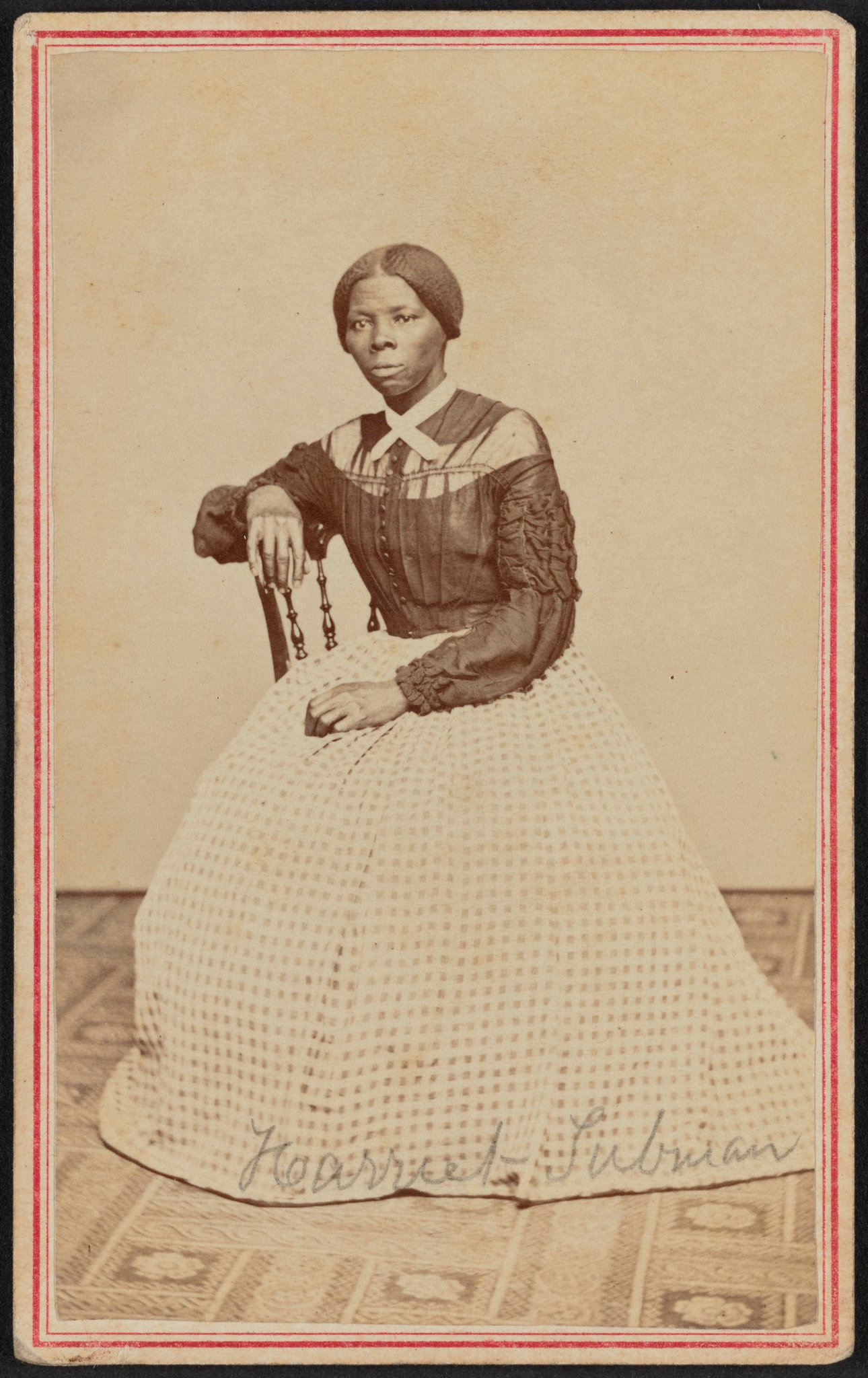
Harriet Tubman was one notable leader for slaves who made the perilous journey to escape towards freedom.

The most common forms of resistance was self-emancipation—escaping an enslaver's control either temporarily or permanently. The legal condition of fugitive slaves in the United States was a major hot-button political issue in antebellum America. In the years immediately prior to the American Civil War, collective escape actions called stampedes became increasingly common.

== Resistance ==
Resistance took many forms; as one historian, George P. Rawick, wrote, "While from sunup to sundown the American slave worked for another and was harshly exploited, from sundown to sunup he lived for himself and created the behavioral and institutional basis which prevented him from becoming the absolute victim."

One of these means of resistance was creating ways for the production of plantations to either slow down or stop. This could mean intentionally working slower, faking sickness or feigning confusion of a task. There may have been many purposeful accidents that would break equipment or stop and set back production.

Resistance could also be an empowerment of that slave. An enslaved person would secretly learn to how to read and write, communicate important information through songs and pray. Some committed suicide or fought back when beaten.

Resistance many times was an act of survival. Some would steal food to feed their families. Others may run away for a short time to prevent the selling of children.

There is evidence that some enslaved people in the United States "added back doors to their dwellings that provided access to an open space shielded by the dwellings on all sides."

Arson was known—gin houses filled with cotton were highly flammable. According to historian Daniel Immerwahr, arson was a frequent but often overlooked form of resistance among enslaved people. While accusations of arson were widespread, confirmed cases were rare due to the nature of fire destroying evidence. Immerwahr highlights the case of Harry Smith, an enslaved man who described in his memoir how he and others deliberately set fire to their enslavers' property as an act of defiance (Immerwahr, 2023, p. 2).

=== Petit Marronage ===
Some slaves would escape only to come back a short time later to take a break from their labor and disrupt the means of production of the plantations, this practice is known as petit marronage. During petit marronage, people could escape their oppressive overseers for a time. This allowed them opportunity to do many things which could include connecting with others, escaping incoming sale or mistreatment and organizing for a rebellion.

== Great Dismal Swamp ==
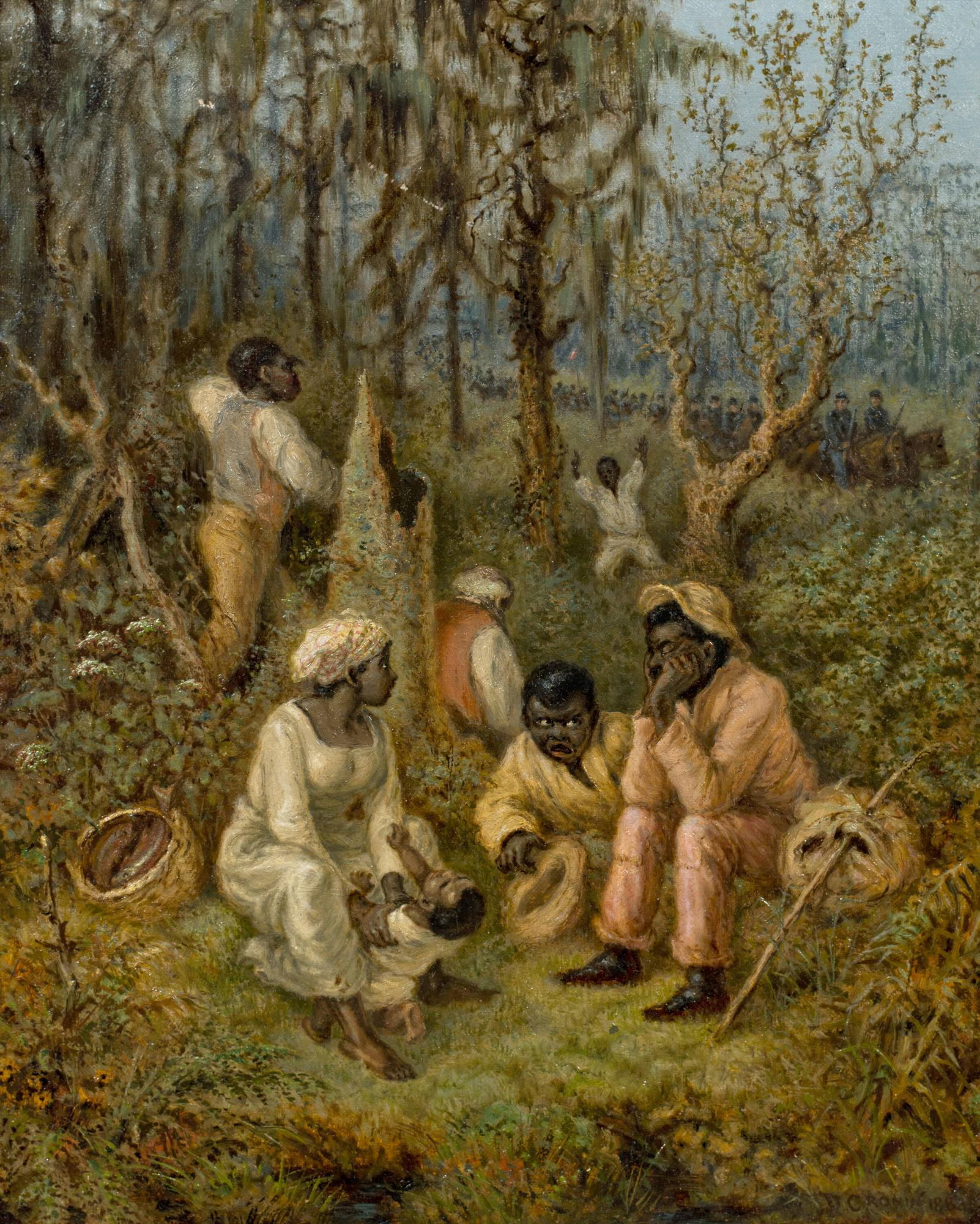
Fugitive slaves reside and make community in the Great Dismal Swamp.

The Great Dismal Swamp located in Virginia and North Carolina, was one prominent place where these slaves would go for this marronage, along with other long-term refugees. The location was strategic as the swamp was dense and could hide its refugees from the plantation owners, militia, and dogs. In the swamp, fugitives could take refuge and would make self-sustained communities. They would fish, farm, art and even trade in the rough swamp environment.

There would be trade for things like shingles, pork and corn. Some would directly sell timber to outside companies. By controlling the quality of the shingles and with competition from other multiple companies who wanted to buy their shingles, these traders had negotiating power. This created more financial freedom for the refugees.

The swamp became a particularly more enticing in times of great upheaval like the American Revolution, reflected by the increase in refugees.

Today the swamp is seen as a place of resistance, where enslaved people could share in their cultural, agricultural and artisan knowledge, make their own economy and have their own freedom.

== East Florida ==
East Florida was a refuge for escaped slaves as early as the American Revolutionary War. Some Black settlers were assimilated into what is now known as the Seminole Nation.

== See also ==
- Anti-Americanism among African Americans
- Gilbert (Tennessee)
- Haitian Revolution
- John Brown's raid on Harpers Ferry
- Suicide, infanticide, and self-mutilation by slaves in the United States
