= Thomas McCargo =

American slave trader (c. 1790–aft. 1854)

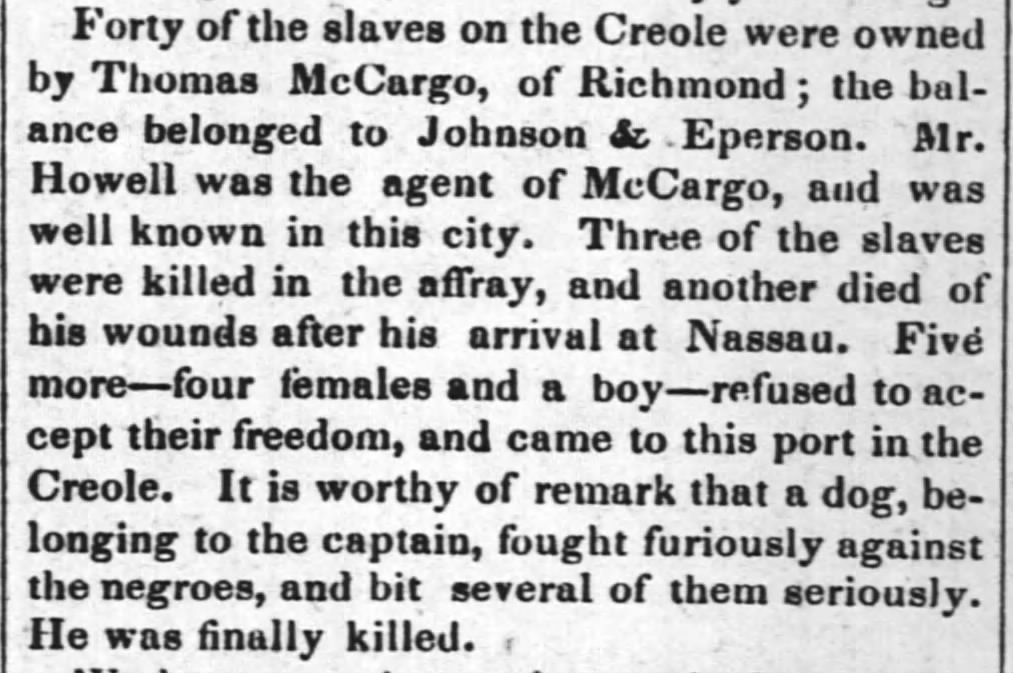
- Paragraph from "Mutiny and murder" article about the Creole takeover (New Orleans Times-Picayune, December 3, 1841)
- Born: c. 1790; Probably Charlotte County, Virginia, U.S.
- Died: After 1854; Unknown
- Other names: Thos. M'Cargo, Mac Cargo, Macargo
- Occupation: Slave trader
- Years active: Probably late 1820s to mid-1850s

Thomas McCargo, also styled Thos. M'Cargo, (c. 1790 – after 1854) was a 19th-century American slave trader who worked in Virginia, Kentucky, Mississippi and Louisiana. He is best remembered today for being one of the slave traders aboard the Creole, which was a coastwise slave ship that was commandeered by the enslaved men aboard and sailed to freedom in the British Caribbean. The takeover of the Creole is considered the most successful slave revolt in antebellum American history.

== Early life ==
Thomas McCargo was likely one of the nine children of David and Nancy McCargo of Charlotte County, Virginia. Census records suggest he was born around 1790 (give or take five years), and he was more than likely born on his parents' farm in the south-central part of the state. Thomas McCargo was enumerated in the 1810 census of Charlotte County, Virginia, at which time he was between 16 and 25 years old; there was one enslaved person living in his household. In March 1811, Thomas McCargo married Elizabeth W. Davis in Halifax County, Virginia. David McCargo bequeathed real estate and "my negro George" to his son Thomas McCargo in his will dated February 3, 1814. At the time of the 1820 census, McCargo was a resident of Banister town, Halifax County, Virginia, where he lived with one free white female under age 10, eight enslaved black men and boys, and one enslaved black woman. In June 1822, Thomas McCargo married Eliza Ragland in Halifax County, Virginia.

As a property-owning white adult male, McCargo was legally permitted to participate in democratic processes in the U.S. state of Virginia in the early Republic era, and as such, in December 1827 he was appointed to a committee of correspondence, which was intended to generate support for the candidacy of Andrew Jackson and in oppose to that of John Quincy Adams in anticipation of the 1828 Presidential election.

In 1830, Mary A. E. M. McCargo, daughter of Thomas McCargo, married James F. Hill in Halifax County, Virginia. Also in 1830, Thomas McCargo was enumerated in the fifth census of the United States as a resident of Halifax County, Virginia; his household consisted of three free whites and 41 black slaves, including 11 children under the age of 10.

== Interstate slave trading ==
McCargo possibly began participating in the interstate slave trade in the United States in the late 1820s. In 1831 McCargo and other passengers traveling north from New Orleans signed an open letter published in the Louisville Courier-Journal, which was addressed to Captain Shalcross and crew of the steamer Hibernia for their "energy, industry, and perseverance, in encountering the ice and other difficulties, which they have done to a more than common extent." (The Ohio River freezing over at Louisville in 1831 is one of the experiences documented in the travel journal of Alexis de Tocqueville.) In 1833, McCargo was seemingly involved in the establishment of the Forks of the Road slave market outside Natchez, Mississippi. Cholera was epidemic that year, and a shipment from Alexandria, Virginia to the Delta region arrived with a number of sick and dying enslaved passengers. Trader Isaac Franklin and his overseer apparently conspired to dump several of the bodies of the dead in a ravine near Natchez, Mississippi, and refused to participate in an investigation of the circumstances by which the barely buried bodies came to be in the ravine. The population of the town was irate at the dead babies and teenagers, and alarmed at the possibility that slave traders were importing contagion. To placate the citizens of Natchez, 10 slave traders, including McCargo, signed a public letter agreeing to relocate outside the city limits. According to one history, McCargo was a subsidiary trader to James Franklin Purvis of Baltimore, who was, in turn, subsidiary to Franklin & Armfield. For the year 1833 he paid $79.43 in taxes for slave sales made in Natchez, Adams County, Mississippi.

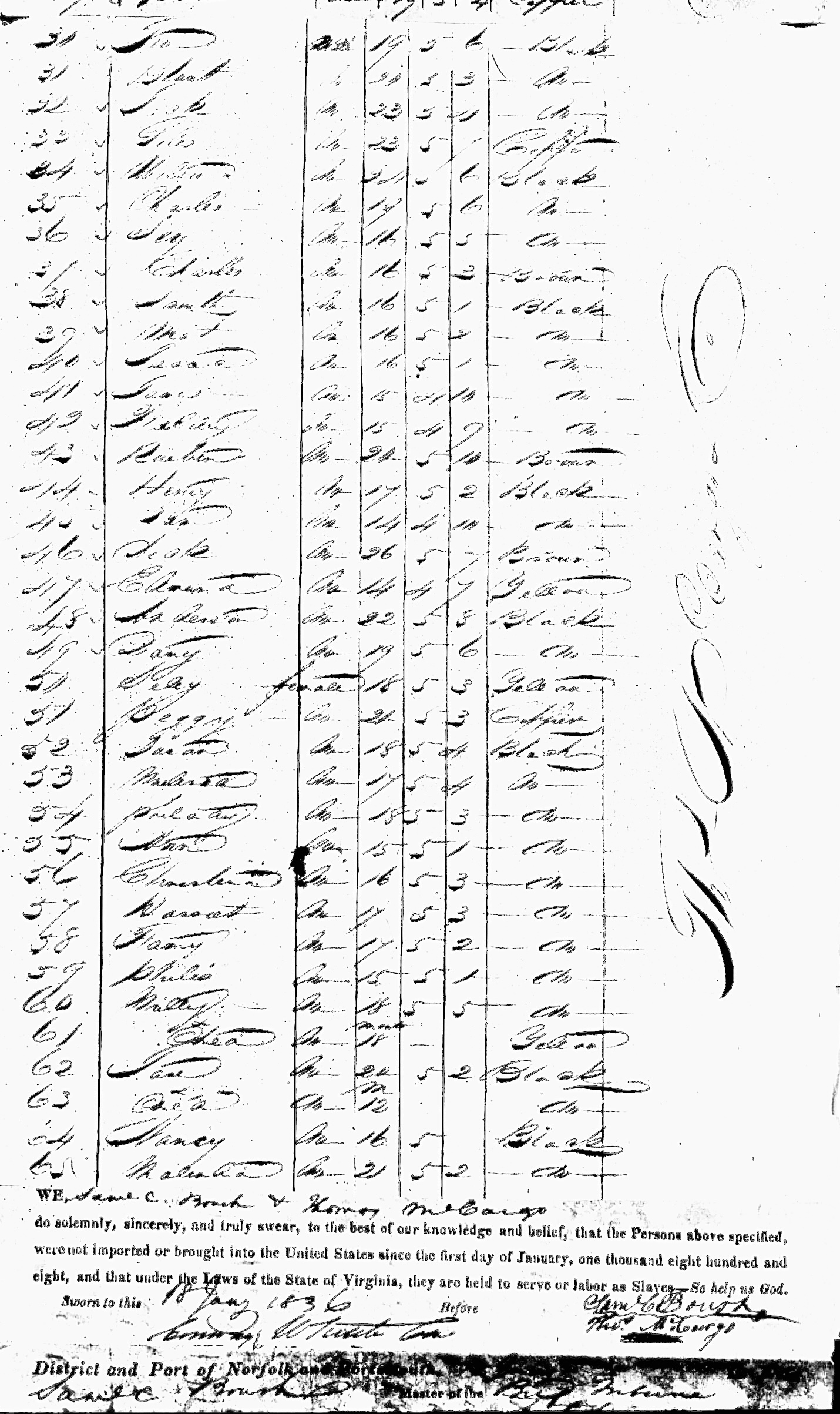
Partial manifest of a coastwise slaver brig, with cargo shipped by Samuel Boush (?) and Thomas McCargo from Norfolk to New Orleans in 1836

In 1835, Thomas McCargo placed an ad reporting that three "bills of exchange" had been stolen from him, totaling US$9,985 (equivalent to $311,629 in 2025). In February 1836, McCargo advertised in Virginia that he would like to pay cash for up 200 enslaved people, from ages 12 to 25. He invited potential sellers to visit his premises near Seabrook's Warehouse in Richmond, "where we are prepared to keep them safe and comfortable, whether for sale or otherwise." The University of Virginia Libraries hold a collection of letters to slave trader William Crow; according to a collection guide created by the library, a trader named Thomas Jackson wrote to Crow in autumn 1839 that the Richmond market was weak in both price and sales volume, but that "McCargo and Purvis had sold all of their slaves."

At the time of the 1840 census, McCargo was resident in Halifax County, Virginia, in a household with two free whites and 29 enslaved blacks, 15 of whom were engaged in agriculture. In 1840, McCargo marketed to New Orleans buyers, "NEGRO BRICKLAYERS. I HAVE for sale two likely young negro men, who have been regularly raised to the above business and are first rate workmen. Apply immediately to THOS. McCARGO, 20 Moreau st." In 1841 a widow named Sarah McMillan placed a runaway slave ad in several Mississippi River valley newspapers seeking the recovery of Jacob—described as 6 ft 2 in (1.88 m), late 30s, "blue eyes, stout built, quick spoken when spoken to"—whom she had purchased from "Macargo, a negro trader, from Virginia."

McCargo appears in John Brown's memoir Slave Life in Georgia. While a prisoner in Theophilus Freeman's slave pen in New Orleans, most likely sometime in the 1840s, Brown recalled being surprised by the number of people per chain-gang that were delivered by slave speculators connected with Freeman, including "Williams from Washington, and Redford and Kelly from Kentucky, and Mac Cargo from Richmond, Virginia." Historian Walter Johnson references Brown's experiences with Freeman and McCargo in his description of the daily lives of New Orleans slave traders:

During the selling season the traders lived with one another. In New Orleans both interstate and local traders boarded at the houses of other traders, sold one another’s slaves, served as witnesses for one another’s sales, and executors for one another’s wills. The company the traders kept was almost exclusively male, as were many of the spaces in which they entertained themselves. The traders usually took their meals in the pens, grouped around a single table, and socialized with one another, some spending their evenings, as ex-slave John Brown remembered of Theophilus Freeman and Thomas McCargo, going to saloons and gambling.

— Walter Johnson, Soul by Soul: Life Inside the Antebellum Slave Market (1999)

Another glimpse of McCargo is found in summary of a Mississippi court decision of 1846 relating to a business transaction of 1836:

Collins v. McCargo; 6 S. and M. 128, January 1846. McCargo; sued...on a writing obligatory,...[129] bill of sale...Natchez Dec'r 16, 1836. Received of...Collins, thirteen thousand dollars...for...eight negroes...note given...[130] Holden testified that...he rented to McCargo; a house near the race track; that McCargo; informed him that he had brought on a lot of negroes ['by land'] from Virginia for sale, and wanted a house to accommodate them in;...that McCargo was a negro trader, and had for many years previous sold a lot of negroes in Natchez, and had returned to Virginia;...that McCargo; had tents, wagons, and other arrangements for travelling," Held: [134] "The...contract was beyond all question void."...

== Creole and consequences ==
In 1841, according to Jeffrey R. Kerr-Ritchie's Rebellious Passage: The Creole Revolt and America's Coastal Slave Trade (2019), Thomas McCargo was one of several traders who were using the Creole to ship slaves from the Chesapeake region of the Upper South to the labor-hungry capitalists of the Cotton Kingdom. McCargo had more human cargo aboard the ship than any of the other traders, and was accompanying his cargo, along with his young nephew and a slave guard, or overseer, named John R. Hewell. He also had insurance on 26 of the enslaved people aboard the ship. The rebels were primarily "owned" by just three of the several traders using the Creole for transport: Robert Lumpkin, George W. Apperson, and Thomas McCargo. The rebels Richard Butler, Pompey Garrison, Williams Jenkins, Elijah Morris, George Portlock, Warner Smith, and Madison Washington were all shipped by McCargo. Of those, Elijah Morris and Madison Washington were two of the four men most commonly described as leaders of the saltwater rebellion. During the takeover, McCargo, his nephew, and Lewis, an elderly enslaved man in McCargo's service, were unharmed. Hewell (the overseer employed by McCargo) fired his pistol at the rebels, was disarmed, was then stabbed multiple times as part of a continuing fight, and was finally beheaded; Hewell's body was later thrown overboard.

McCargo had taken out an insurance policy on his shipment of US$800 (equivalent to $24,968 in 2025) per person; the insurance company claimed "slave revolt enabled by the British" was not covered under the policy. Surviving records of Thomas McCargo v. The New Orleans Insurance Company, McCargo's lawsuit and the insurance company's appeals, are primary sources for historians studying the Creole takeover. Attorney Judah P. Benjamin, later of the Confederate cabinet, represented the insurance company in its successful appeal before the Louisiana Supreme Court. McCargo ultimately did not receive the expected US$20,800 (equivalent to $718,714 in 2025) payout from New Orleans Insurance Company, but he did receive US$14,400 (equivalent to $497,571 in 2025) for his losses from another maritime insurance company.

== Later life ==
Thomas McCargo continued in the slave trade after the Creole revolt. There was a letter waiting for Thomas McCargo at the New Orleans post office in April 1851. "T McCargo, N O" arrived at the Galt House hotel in Louisville on October 15, 1851. "T McCargo Va" arrived at the Louisville Hotel on September 8, 1852. There were letters waiting for Thos. McCargo in Louisville in October 1853, and in New Orleans in January 1854. In 1855 McCargo was awarded a large settlement by an Anglo-American maritime claims commission in compensation for his losses on the Creole.

The circumstances of Thomas McCargo's life after 1855 are unknown.

== See also ==
- List of American slave traders
- History of slavery in Louisiana
- History of slavery in Mississippi
- History of slavery in Virginia
