= Decatur slave-ship mutiny =

1826 American slave rebellion

The Decatur slave-ship mutiny was an act of slave rebellion in the United States that occurred in April 1826 on a coastwise slave ship sailing out of Baltimore, Maryland, bound for the New Orleans slave market. The captain and first mate were thrown overboard. The hijacked ship was twice interdicted by other vessels and captives taken, but upon arriving in New York, 14 former captives escaped. One, William Bowser, was recaptured, tried, and hanged. The other 13 seem to have achieved their freedom.

The slaves aboard the Decatur had been shipped by Baltimore's infamous Austin Woolfolk. As retold by historian Calvin Schermerhorn, the Decatur mutiny led to a famous instance of anti-abolitionist violence. When pioneering abolitionist Benjamin Lundy covered Bowser's trial and execution, he reported that "Bowser forgave Woolfolk while walking to the Ellis Island gallows as the slave trader cursed him. When Lundy ran into Woolfolk near the Baltimore Post Office the following winter, the slave trader attacked the abolitionist for smearing him. Woolfolk was seven inches taller and as many years younger than the Quaker editor, who put up no resistance to being stomped on the head."

== See also ==
- La Amistad – 1839 slave-ship takeover
- Creole case – 1841 slave-ship seizure
- History of slavery in Maryland
- History of slavery in Louisiana
- Slave trade in the United States
