= The Heroic Slave =

Book by abolitionist Frederick Douglass (1852)

The Heroic Slave, a Heartwarming Narrative of the Adventures of Madison Washington, in Pursuit of Liberty is a novella written by abolitionist Frederick Douglass. When the Rochester Ladies' Anti-Slavery Society asked Douglass for a short story to go in their collection, Autographs for Freedom, Douglass responded with The Heroic Slave. The novella, published in 1852 by John P. Jewett and Company, was Douglass's first and only published work of fiction (though he did publish three autobiographical narratives).

The Heroic Slave was based on the Creole case, in which Madison Washington, an enslaved cook on the brig Creole, led a shipboard rebellion of 19 slaves in November 1841. They succeeded in taking control of the ship en route from Virginia to New Orleans (known as the coastwise slave trade) and ordered it sailed to Nassau, Bahamas, a British port. A total of 135 slaves gained their freedom there, becoming the largest and most successful slave rebellion in United States history.

== Plot ==
Part I opens as Madison Washington carries a heavy load through the woods, lamenting his condition under slavery. Mr. Listwell, a free white man, secretly watches him in silence.

In Part II, the story moves ahead five years. Mr. Listwell is sitting at the table with his wife when they hear a knock at the door. Madison Washington is running from slavery, and Mr. Listwell is more than willing to help him escape. As they talk, Mr. Listwell tells Madison he remembers him from so many years before, and asks him where he has been all of this time. Madison reveals that on the day Mr. Listwell saw him, he left his wife and children to escape and seek freedom. Unable to find his way to the North, he returned to his plantation a week later. He met with his wife who regularly gave him food and provision, and for five years hid in the woods. However, a great fire caused Madison to lose his hiding place, which is why he ran to see Mr. Listwell. Mr. Listwell gives Madison a new coat and provisions and helps him escape to Canada.

In Part III, Mr. Listwell is in a tavern and reveals that he has traveled 40 miles (64 km) that day. As he drinks, he sees a slave-gang on their way to market, and is surprised to see Madison Washington among the slaves. Madison reveals that he reached Canada, but he missed his wife so he returned to the United States to help her escape. He reached her bedroom window, but he scared her so much that she woke up her master. The couple were chased by the master and his dogs. His wife was shot down and killed and he had been sold to traders who would take him to the Deep South. Mr. Listwell realizes there's nothing he can do for Madison in these conditions, but implores the man to put his trust in God. As he is leaving, Mr. Listwell buys three files; he gives them and $10 secretly to Madison. Part III ends with Madison taken aboard a ship, put in chains together with other slaves, and sailing to the South for re-sale.

In Part IV, white men speak about "unfortunate" events that occurred aboard the ship Creole. Madison Washington gained the trust of all of the overseers on board and, using the files Mr. Listwell had given him, cuts through his fetters and leads the slaves in rebellion. Nineteen slaves survived the battle. Madison took over as captain of the ship, ordering it sailed to Nassau, the British colony of the Bahamas. Britain had abolished slavery there in 1833. In Nassau, a group of black soldiers declared that they only protected property, and people were not property, so the 19 slaves were freed.

== The Heroic Slave and the American Revolutionary Tradition Symposium ==
In 2014, a two-day symposium called "Frederick Douglass's The Heroic Slave and the American Revolutionary Tradition" took place at Purdue University in Indiana, where historians and literary critics discussed The Heroic Slave. Ideas surrounding African American fiction, the abolitionist movement, interracial relationships, and the historical and political context of slavery were debated. These topics were split into five sections of the volume of articles that was published after the symposium, titled The Heroic Slave: A Cultural and Critical Edition.

Contributions were given by many scholars, five of which were included in the published volume. The first was Stanley Harrold, a historian at South Carolina State University, who detailed the romanticism surrounding Douglass's version of Madison Washington's self-led slave revolt. The second article titled "Insurrection as Righteous Rebellion in The Heroic Slave and Beyond" by Linda Diane Barnes of Youngstown State University differentiates between natural "law" and natural "rights" in the context of slave ideology. The next part of the volume by professor, John R. McKivigan, and librarian, Rebecca A. Pattillo of the Douglass Papers Project explains Douglass's international impact with this piece and the support he garnered through "transnational coalitions". These efforts helped raise awareness on antislavery principles and celebrated the abolitionist movement. Jane E. Schultz of Purdue University provided the fourth part of this volume through her piece "Gimme Shelter" which highlighted the constant mobility, and as a result, lack of refuge that every slave was plagued with. Last, but not least, is the analysis given by the symposium's keynote speaker, Robert Levine from University of Maryland, who compared The Heroic Slave with other pieces like Uncle Tom's Cabin and Autographs for Freedom. Levine says that Douglass's story stands out for his incorporation of "heroic insurgency", and he notes its inclusion in the Norton Anthology of American Literature. For a more detailed overview on the themes discussed during the symposium, reference the "Themes" section below.

== The Fictitious Madison Washington ==
The Heroic Slave included many fictional elements. The narrative was based on the famous Creole revolt led by an enslaved cook, Madison Washington. Douglass's fictional Madison Washington was romanticized, deviating from nonfiction accounts of the real Madison Washington. William Wells Brown and Lydia Maria Child also wrote fictional accounts of the Creole uprising after Douglass's version came out, and the three versions portrayed the story's details differently. For example, Douglass doesn't give many details as to why Washington decided to escape in the first place, but Brown blames it on his failure to "gather an insurrection of slaves" and Childs says his wife, Susan, persuades him to leave. Additionally, the locations that Washington travels to are different in the three versions, as well as who captured him once he landed. Brown's version explains the details of the revolt further, while Child's version (like Douglass's) incorporates certain details like Susan "rushing into his arms" once they met up again.

=== Nonfiction vs. Fiction ===
Douglass points out that Washington's motives involved fighting for his freedom and natural rights but not necessarily being part of the abolitionist movement. However, in the nonfiction accounts of the revolt, Washington expressed his strong support for the abolitionist movement, having met many abolitionists like Lindley Murray Moore and Henry Highland Garnet. The fictitious versions also don't embellish on what may have inspired Washington to lead a slave revolt as big as the Creole. Nonfiction accounts have pointed to major precedents of Washington's revolt being events like the La Amistad revolt and white minister Abel Brown's mission to help slaves in Maryland escape. Additionally, according to the "Protest of the Crew of the American Brig Creole" published by the New Orleans Advertiser, many more white passengers died than were actually reported by Douglass. Lastly, doubts have been raised regarding Washington's sole leadership of revolt. In the same article in the New Orleans Advertiser, five crew members aboard the ship affirmed that, in addition to Washington, Ben Blacksmith, Elijah Morris, and D. Ruffin were also leaders of the revolt who killed the white passenger on guard. Despite these differences, Douglass's description of Washington as a strong masculine figure was corroborated by other witnesses. Overall, many details remain unclear, and whether any of these accounts are fabrications remains unknown.

== Themes ==
=== Nationalism ===
Nationalism refers to a group of people's joint effort to promote a common political or social cause or belief. University of California, Irvine professor Krista Walter argues that Frederick Douglass related the Creole slave revolt led by Madison Washington with a nationalistic viewpoint. She says Washington persuaded his fellow bondsmen to fight against the white authority that had pushed them around for too long and to stand together as one. Outside audiences have pointed to the incorporation of nationalism within the slaveholder ideology as well. It was believed that slavery upheld the unification and superiority of the white elite over other social classes, justifying the institution as a whole. The Heroic Slave portrayed how nationalism was exemplified by both slaves and masters.

=== Masculinity ===
Masculinity can be defined as characteristics or features usually applied to men. In mass media, examples of this include muscular body shapes, rigid emotions, valor, confidence, and many more. Frederick Douglass personified Madison Washington as having a strong figure, along with the other men involved in the revolt. Many scholars have pointed to possible reasons to include these attributes, such as the need to ensure the slave movement was taken seriously by outside audiences. Although Douglass's purpose of including these stereotypical features remains unknown, this is still a topic of discussion among literary and historical intellectuals.

=== Patriotism ===
The beginnings of Patriotism were first observed among the Americans leading up to and during the American Revolutionary War. Referred to as the Patriots, the American people fought for their independence against Great Britain, demonstrating their dedication and loyalty to their country. Krista Walter insinuates that The Heroic Slave showcases a similar example of patriotic feelings towards the abolitionist movement, and how these emotions triggered the eventual escape and freedom of 135 slaves. It is useful to note however that intense patriotism, according to many academics, may have clouded judgement on government actions. Post the American Civil War, remnants of inequality throughout the South still lingered, and this period was known as the Reconstruction era. During this time, the government often times put the best interests of the nation over those of its constituents when instituting certain laws, and ignored the discriminative mentalities that pursued. Walter concludes that it took many years to finally overcome the effects of superiority ideals, and this could've been the effect of intense patriotic values from the past.

=== Refuge ===
Refuge for runaway slaves was often brief, because they were constantly on the run, and this was the case for Madison Washington. He left his wife and children to escape but, as he was unsuccessful, he returned to his previous plantation. There he secretly met his wife and sought refuge in the woods for five years to avoid getting caught. When a forest fire occurred, he had to escape again and later meets Mr. Listwell who provides him with food and clothes. He leaves his residence shortly after to go to Canada, and the story continues with his escape to freedom aboard the Creole. Washington was never able to truly live in comfort or peace before he gained his freedom, and his fight was in part prompted by his desire to gain permanent refuge. As scholars John R. McKivigan and Jane E. Schultz point out, this is a common theme among many narratives when slaves try to gain their freedom, as they find themselves constantly traveling to different locations to avoid getting caught.

=== Law vs. Rights ===
McKivigan and Schultz also denote the distinction between natural law and natural rights as being critical in the understanding of the slave perspective and abolitionist agenda. They argue that rights in the United States are bestowed upon every person no matter their race, gender, or socioeconomic status from the moment they are born. These unalienable rights above all else include the right to freedom, and this is what bondsmen like Madison Washington fought for during their revolt. Washington quotes that he felt "robbed of his just rights" and that colored people like himself were "protected in all the rights of men", but the law at the time didn't reflect this. The law stripped basic human rights from African Americans, deeming them as inferior and upholding slaveholder principles. This divide between law and rights was a crucial component of many runaway slaves' motives throughout The Heroic Slave and has continued to be analyzed over the years.

=== Romanticism ===
Romanticism involves imaginative and emotional language in regards to pieces of media, literature, and social movements. Although a topic of subjectivity, scholars have pointed to the prolific romanticism detailed throughout Madison Washington's journey with attention to specific details. For instance, accounts of Washington's wife rushing into his arms after they meet again may have been overexaggerated according to nonfiction accounts. Additionally, Stanley Harrold stated that the nonviolent description of the uprising as a whole with an exclusion of details surrounding the death of White soldiers aboard the Creole speaks to Douglass's purpose in depicting a certain view of the abolitionist movement throughout the narrative. More about nonviolence in regards to The Heroic Slave is included below.

=== Nonviolence ===
A certain degree of Nonviolence was upheld throughout the piece to help create the heroic spin to the story according to Harrold. Douglass in the narrative writes that only two white men were killed by slaves aboard the ship, and this was only done when absolutely necessary. Although still a topic of discussion, historians have pointed out the disconect between Douglass's version of the journey and Washington's real accounts of what he experienced. His personal accounts as alluded to earlier, explain that many more white passengers died during the revolt. These conversations have brought into question whether nonviolence was really practiced aboard the Creole and among anti-slavery movements in general.

== Editions ==
- Douglass, Frederick. The Heroic Slave, The Life and Writings of Frederick Douglass: Supplement Volume 1844–1860. Vol. V. edited by Philip S. Foner. New York: International, 1975, pp. 473–505.
- Douglass, Frederick (2015). Levine, Robert S.; Stauffer, John; McKivigan, John R. (eds.). The Heroic Slave : A Cultural and Critical Edition. New Haven: Yale University Press. ISBN 9780300184624.
- Douglass, Frederick (2019). The Heroic Slave. Dover Thrift Edition.
- Douglass, Frederick (2023). The Frederick Douglass Collection: A Library of America Boxed Set, including Autobiographies, edited by Henry Louis Gates and Speeches & Writings, edited by David W. Blight.
