= Enterprise (slave ship) =

American merchant vessel and slave ship

The Enterprise was a United States merchant vessel active in the coastwise slave trade in the early 19th century along the Atlantic Coast. Bad weather forced it into Hamilton, Bermuda, waters on February 11, 1835, while it carried 78 slaves in addition to other cargo. It became the centre of a minor international incident when the British authorities freed nearly all the slaves. Britain had abolished slavery in its Caribbean colonies effective 1834. At that time it advised "foreign nations that any slavers found in Bermuda [and the Bahamas] waters would be subject to arrest and seizure. Their cargoes were liable to forfeiture" without compensation.

Bermuda customs officers called a gunboat and Royal Navy forces to detain the Enterprise ship, and a Bermudian ex-slave Richard Tucker served the white captain with a writ of habeas corpus, ordering him to deliver the slaves to the Bermuda Supreme Court so they could speak as to their choice of gaining freedom in the colony or returning with the ship to slavery in the United States. The court met from 9 p.m. to midnight on February 18, and the Chief Justice interviewed each slave. Seventy-two of the seventy-eight slaves from the Enterprise chose to stay in Bermuda and gain freedom.

The freeing of the slaves from Enterprise was one of several similar incidents from 1830 to 1842: officials in Bermuda and the Bahamas freed a total of nearly 450 slaves from United States ships in the domestic trade, after the ships had been wrecked in their waters or entered their ports for other reasons. United States owners kept pressing the government for claims for their losses. In the 1853 Treaty of Claims, the US and Britain agreed to settle a variety of claims dating to 1814, including those for slaves freed after 1834. This was ultimately settled by arbitration in 1855, establishing a payment of $270,700 against the US Government, due British subjects, and $329,000 against the British Government, due to American citizens. Ultimately some insurance companies were paid for the loss of property of the slaves.

== Background ==
Both the United States and Great Britain had banned the international slave trade since 1807, and both operated sailing patrols off Africa (UK West Africa Squadron and US Africa Squadron) and in the Caribbean to intercept illegal vessels and suppress the trade. The United States in its legislation preserved the right to operate ships for its domestic coastwise slave trade among various markets along the East and Gulf coasts, which became increasingly important as the Deep South rapidly developed cotton cultivation. With labor demand at a height, in the antebellum years, nearly a million enslaved African Americans were moved to the Deep South in a forced migration, two-thirds through the domestic slave trade. New Orleans had the largest slave market and its port was important for the slave trade and related businesses.

In 1818, the Home Office in London had ruled that "any slave brought to the Bahamas from outside the British West Indies would be manumitted." This interpretation led to British colonial officials freeing a total of nearly 450 slaves owned by U.S. nationals from 1830 to 1842, in incidents in which American merchant ships were wrecked in the Bahamas or put into colonial ports for other reasons. The American slave ship Comet was wrecked in 1830 off Abaco Island, as was the Encomium in February 1834. Customs officials seized the cargoes of slaves when brought into Nassau by wreckers, and colonial officials freed them: 164 slaves from the Comet and 45 from the Encomium. Britain paid an indemnity to the US in those two cases, but only in 1855 under the Treaty of Claims of 1853. Additional slaves were liberated from American ships during the intervening years.

Great Britain abolished slavery effective in August 1834 in the British Isles, most of its colonies and their waters. Since the emancipation, Britain had advised "foreign nations that any slavers found in Bermuda [and the Bahamas] waters would be subject to arrest and seizure. Their cargoes were liable to forfeiture" without compensation.

== Enterprise in Bermuda ==
In February 1835, seven days out on a voyage between Alexandria, Virginia, and Charleston, South Carolina, the American brig Enterprise was driven off-course by a hurricane and forced to put in for provisions at Hamilton, Bermuda, a British colony. When the customs officers arrived on the large, 127-ton ship on February 11, they discovered that it held a total of 78 slaves, in what they reported were appalling conditions. The captives were not listed on the ship's manifest for cargo. Alexandria and Washington, DC, comprised a major market for slaves from the Chesapeake Bay area, of Virginia, Maryland and Delaware, being sold and shipped to the Deep South. Most of the slaves on the Enterprise were owned by Joseph Neal, and they were highly valuable, as they were young, American-born and spoke English. They were listed as mostly between the ages of 7 and 15, and 19 to 25. There were a total of 41 females and 37 males.

The customs officials told Captain Smith that the slaves were illegal in Bermuda and subject to forfeiture; they ordered him to bring them ashore. The British summoned a gunboat and Royal Navy forces to put the crew under armed guard. When Smith threatened to leave in defiance, local forces detained the Americans.

Richard Tucker intervened; he was the Bermudian founder in 1832 of the local black Young Men's Friendly Lodge (a mutual aid group). He obtained a writ of habeas corpus from the court compelling the captain, Elliot Smith, to bring the slaves "before the Chief Justice and answer for themselves whether they would proceed with the vessel to her destined port and continue slaves, or remain at Bermuda and be free."

Some 78 slaves, many of them women with children, were removed from the ship to prepare for their court hearing. By the time they landed at Barr's Bay Park near Hamilton, an "immense crowd" had gathered to greet them. Many of the crowd had been freed just the year before and were excited to think the American slaves might gain freedom.

The Bermuda Supreme Court convened at 9 p.m. on February 18 to interview the slaves. The hearing lasted until midnight in a packed room; a large crowd of locals attended the session. Bermuda's Chief Justice Thomas Butterfield interviewed the slaves individually, and asked whether they wished to return to the US and slavery, or remain in Bermuda as free persons. During this session, the Court heard that many of the people had been free blacks in Maryland that raiders had kidnapped and sold into slavery.

A woman named Ridgely, with her five children, chose to return to the United States. The remaining 72 people chose to stay in Bermuda. That night, on February 18, 1835, the Supreme Court freed them. A journalist present wrote, "It would be difficult to describe the sense of joy and wonderment that prevailed."

The Attorney General initiated a subscription on behalf of the freedmen, and $70 was quickly raised from attendees to help them. Mayor William Cox of Hamilton offered them the use of a vacant storehouse as a place to sleep. Well-wishers and the Friendly Society aided the new freedmen in finding housing and jobs, and quickly integrating into local society.

The Enterprise case contributed to the tensions arising between Great Britain and the United States over the question of slavery during the period after it had been abolished in Britain and her colonies. The United States continued with it as a domestic trade and profitable institution in the South. This was one of several incidents in which British officials in Bermuda or the West Indies freed slaves owned by Americans. While the US and Britain worked to suppress the international slave trade from Africa, the US wanted to protect its domestic slavers if weather or accidents drove them into British colonial ports. In the case of the Enterprise and other incidents, local British citizens took action on behalf of American slaves.

== Related incidents ==
In 1840, Hermosa, a US schooner in the coastwise slave trade, carrying 38 slaves from Richmond to New Orleans for sale, went aground on one of the Abacos islands in the Bahamas. After salvors took the ship to port, the captain refused to let the slaves off. With the US consul, he tried to arrange for another ship to take his slave cargo for delivery. British magistrates backed with armed force boarded Hermosa, taking the slaves off and freeing them when they reached shore. The Americans protested.

The Creole Case gained notoriety as it resulted from a November 1841 slave revolt on an American brig. After 19 slaves took control of the crew of the Creole, they ordered the ship sailed to Nassau, Bahamas; one of the leaders had heard of the Hermosa case the year before and knew the British had abolished slavery. Ultimately, 128 of 135 slaves from the Creole were freed by the British colonists. It was the most successful slave revolt in US history. The US was concerned not only about compensation for slaveholders' losses. It feared that the success of the Creole slaves would encourage others to attempt such ship revolts to reach freedom in the British West Indies, and threaten the coastwise slave trade and slavery in the South.

The US-British negotiations on the Webster-Ashburton Treaty (1842) were underway at the time and partially resolved the international tensions. The Martin Van Buren administration had formally demanded the return of the American slaves from the Creole, which Britain refused. Southern slaveholders continued to press Congress for compensation for their loss of "property."

In correspondence with US Secretary of State Daniel Webster, the British diplomat Lord Ashburton, while repeating that British law forbidding slavery was unalterable, assured Webster that, in the interest of 'good neighbourhood,' the Crown would inform the governors of the colonies on the southern borders of the United States against "officious interference" when chance drove American vessels into British jurisdiction.

== Claims treaty and compensation ==
The articles of a February 1853 Treaty of Claims between Great Britain and the United States included the claims of slave-owners who had suffered financially through the British liberation of slaves in the Enterprise, Hermosa, and Creole incidents. A claims commission met in London from September 15, 1853, to January 15, 1855, to settle the amount of total awards covered under this treaty, which extended to a variety of claims dating from December 1814. In February 1855, Congress passed a bill accepting the commission's settlement and appropriating funds for the US payment required.

For several years following signing of the Webster-Ashburton Treaty, the United States had no complaints against Britain related to emancipating slaves from American ships at Caribbean ports. But, even if officials could be instructed to turn a blind eye, the residents of British colonies (many of whom had formerly been enslaved) sometimes took direct action to free American slaves.

On July 20, 1855, the New York Times reported that an American slave had been removed in late June by Jamaicans from the brig Young America at Savanna-la-Mar, Jamaica and "set at large". According to the US Consul in Jamaica, the man in question had boarded the Young America with papers showing he was a free man named Nettles. Later he said his name was really Anderson, and he was a slave escaping from a Mr. Robinson. The Consul noted that, if this were true, Anderson would have become free "on touching British soil." The Consul had written to the Collector of the Port of Norfolk, Virginia, advising shipmasters to avoid bringing black crew to Jamaica, because of their high rate of desertion at the island. He noted that it was difficult to recover deserters because of strong local opposition to slavery, as well as the US and Great Britain lacking any treaty applying to their recovery.

== Legacy ==
- The Bermudian Heritage Museum at St. George has an exhibit related to the Enterprise and the freeing of its slaves.
- Lucinda Spurling's documentary, The Lion and the Mouse: The Story of American and Bermuda (2009), includes a passage featuring teacher Verona Trott, who talks about her ancestor Mahalay Warfield, one of the 72 slaves freed from the Enterprise.
- To celebrate the 175th anniversary of the liberation of the slaves from the Enterprise, local authorities commissioned sculptor Chesley Trott to create a statue. We Arrive was unveiled in February 2010.
- In February 2010, the Freedom Schooner Amistad helped celebrate the 175th anniversary of the Enterprise slaves' freedom by making an 'ambassador of friendship' visit to Bermuda. Amistad is an American tall ship launched in 2000 to commemorate the U.S. Supreme Court decision upholding the rights of Africans on the Amistad to free themselves.
