= Madison Washington =

American slave and rebellion leader

Madison Washington was an American enslaved man who led a slave rebellion in the United States on November 7, 1841, on board the brig Creole, which was transporting 134 other slaves from Virginia for sale in New Orleans, as part of the coastwise slave trade.

Washington was born into slavery in Virginia. After spending most of his life on a slave plantation he managed to escape in 1839 and, with the help of the Underground Railroad, he fled to Canada. During his travels he was harboured by abolitionist Robert Purvis. Purvis recalled that Washington was fascinated by a portrait of Joseph Cinqué, a slave who led a successful uprising aboard the schooner La Amistad. Washington later returned to Virginia to look for his still-enslaved wife, which resulted in his being recaptured by an overseer and placed aboard the Creole to be sold alongside her.

On the night of Nov. 7, 1841, Washington led 18 of his fellow slaves into rebellion, killing slave trader John R. Hewell and subduing the crew. Taking control of the Creole, they commanded that it be sailed to Nassau, which was a British colony. The United Kingdom had already abolished slavery in 1833 in the British Empire. Despite American protests, the British declared the slaves to be free persons under their law and refused American demands for their return.

The British authorities in Nassau took Washington and his 17 conspirators into custody under charges of mutiny. A special session of the Admiralty Court heard the case, but ruled in favor of the men and freed them in April 1842. The remaining 116 slaves had achieved freedom immediately in the preceding fall. Five had remained on the ship and chose to return to the United States and slavery. As 128 slaves gained freedom resulting from this revolt, it is considered the most successful in American history.

== Legacy among abolitionists ==
- The abolitionist Henry Highland Garnet praised Madison Washington in his 1843 "Address to the Slaves of the United States," calling Madison Washington a "bright star of freedom" who "took his station in the constellation of true heroism." This call for open rebellion was considered too radical for abolitionist William Lloyd Garrison.
- Frederick Douglass wrote a novella, The Heroic Slave (1853), whose lead character was inspired by and named Madison Washington. This short story is considered one of the first known pieces of African-American fictional literature.
- William Wells Brown included a chapter on Madison Washington in his book, The Black Man: His Antecedents, His Genius, and His Achievements. New York: Thomas Hamilton; Boston: R.F. Wallcut, 1863.
- Lydia Maria Child included a chapter on Madison Washington in her book, The Freedmen's Book. (1865).

== See also ==
- List of slaves
- Slave revolt
- Slavery in the United States
- Coastwise slave trade
