= African-American patriotism =

Patriotism toward the United States is a contentious topic among African Americans due to historical and present day racism. As a result, different beliefs have formed, regarding the role of patriotism in the lives of African Americans.

== Historical ==
=== Frederick Douglass ===
In 1847, when most African Americans were still enslaved, the influential abolitionist Frederick Douglass denounced patriotism, stating "I have no love for America, as such; I have no patriotism. I have no country. What country have I? The institutions of this country do not know me, do not recognize me as a man."

=== James Baldwin ===
In Notes of a Native Son, James Baldwin advocated for constructive patriotism, claiming "I love America more than any other country in this world, and, exactly for this reason, I insist on the right to criticize her perpetually."

== Contemporary ==
=== Johnson's four profiles ===
After interviewing African Americans on their beliefs regarding patriotism, Micah E. Johnson described four distinct profiles among African Americans, which Johnson labelled the bystander, the sycophant, the subverter, and the conscious patriot.

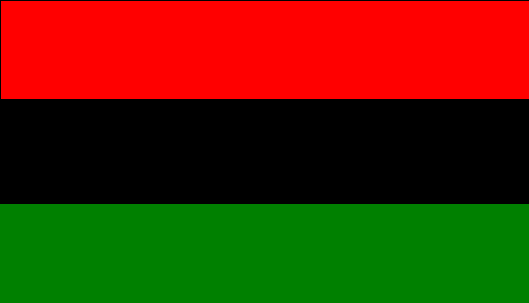
Several black nationalist organisations have rejected American patriotism and instead advocate for the creation of a new black nation.

Bystander
Johnson describes bystanders as African Americans who lack patriotism for the United States and are detached from American history and values. Furthermore, these individuals also tend to be detached from blackness and often espouse a color-blind, meritocratic understanding of society.
Sycophant
Johnson describes sycophants as African Americans who downplay racial inequalities and priotitize assimilation into mainstream America. These individuals tend to deny the existence of institutional racism.
Subverter
Johnson describes subverters as African Americans who reject patriotism towards the United States and are aware of the racial inequality present in American society. One subverter expressed:

"At what point in time in Americas history has America given the black man reason to be patriotic? On the contrary, America continuously shows the black man he has no rights that the white American has to respect."

Subverters usually express patriotism towards an alternative homeland such as Africa or a metaphorical black nation. Several historical and contemporary black nationalist organisations have advocated for the creation of a separate black nation in the United States.
Conscious patriot
Johnson describes conscious patriots as African Americans who feel attached to America and are willing to critique the social inequalities present in American society. Johnson describes Martin Luther King as a conscious patriot.

=== Surveys ===
Among African-American respondents in a 2022 YouGov survey of 1,000 American adults:

- 29% described themselves as "very patriotic".
- 30% described themselves as "somewhat patriotic".
- 12% described themselves as "not very patriotic".
- 9% described themselves as "not at all patriotic".

== See also ==
- Black nationalism
- American nationalism
- Americanism
- Anti-Americanism among African Americans
