= Hermosa (slave ship) =

American slave ship

Hermosa was an American slave ship whose 1840 grounding in the Bahamas led to a controversy between the United Kingdom and the United States over the 38 slaves who had been on board the ship and were freed by the British authorities.

== Background ==
Hermosa was sailing from Richmond, Virginia, to New Orleans, Louisiana, in 1840 with a cargo of slaves when she was wrecked in the Abaco Islands. Because the United Kingdom had abolished slavery in 1833, the local government forcibly removed and freed the slaves after the ship docked in Nassau in the Bahamas.

== Impact ==
The freeing of Hermosa's slaves was widely discussed in the United States. The next year, slaves on the slave ship Creole rebelled against Creole′s crew, and chose to go to the Bahamas because they had heard about Hermosa. The cases of both ships were discussed in the United States Congress, leading to at least one call for war against Britain if compensation was not made.

== Resolution ==
The owner of Hermosa's slaves, Robert Lumpkin, sought compensation in admiralty court. The case was dealt with together with claims related to Creole and the slave ship Enterprise, and the ship's insurers were awarded $16,000 in compensation in 1855.
