= Anti-Americanism among African Americans =

Panel from the comic Death Rap: Tupac Shakur, A Life, in which America is spelt "AmeriKKKa" and the patriotic song My Country, 'Tis of Thee is satirized.

Anti-Americanism has been a recurring theme among several influential African American political organizations and activists due to racism against African Americans domestically, and against other non-white people internationally. African-American anti-Americanism can be contrasted with African-American patriotism, although the two are not necessarily mutually exclusive antonyms.

== History ==
The African-American community is unique compared to Afro-Caribbean or Afro-Brazilian peoples in that "unique natural population growth resulted in a slave population that was already about four-fifths American-born by the late 18th century; after the end of the slave trade in 1808 the number of African-born slaves in the South faded to statistical insignificance." Revolutionary Anti-Americanism, as manifested by politically active African-American elites, was rare in the 19th and earliest 20th century, in part because African-Americans of the era were educated at institutions that manifested the paternalistic and elite worldviews of the high-caste WASPs who contributed to their establishment. Some early African-American nationalism was integrated with the idea of the African diaspora and the concept of pan-Africanism, developed by Alexander Crummell, Martin R. Delany, and Henry McNeil Turner, among others.

== Political organizations ==
Several African-American radical and underground movement organizations professed anti-Americanism.

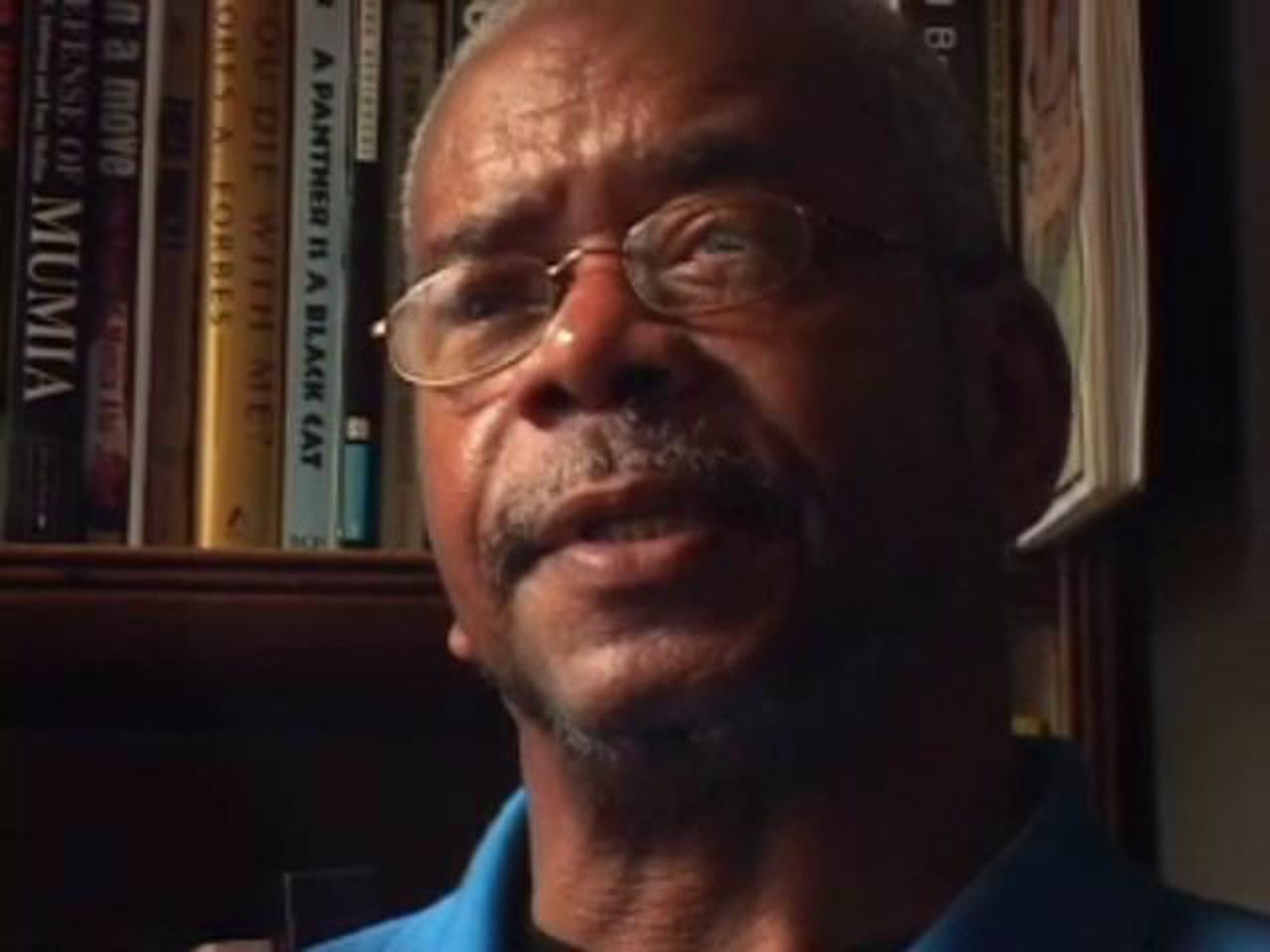
RAM leader Muhammad Ahmad (previously Max Stanford) advocated for the destruction of the United States, along with other "white imperialist oppressors", including the Soviet Union.

=== Black Panther Party ===
The Black Panther Party's founder Huey P. Newton criticized American nationalism. Furthermore, the party believed that the destruction of the United States was a prerequisite for a world revolution.

=== Revolutionary Action Movement ===
In 1966, the Revolutionary Action Movement (RAM) published a document titled "World Black Revolution", in which the organisation advocates for the destruction of the United States, along with Europe and the Soviet Union, which they considered equally as imperialistic and white supremacist as the United States.

=== Black Guerrilla Family ===
The Black Guerrilla Family rejected patriotism for the United States and called for the overthrow of the American government.

== Literature ==
=== Blood in My Eye ===
In Blood in My Eye (1972), George Jackson calls for the destruction of the United States, stating:

"We must accept the eventuality of bringing the U.S.A. to its knees; accept the closing off of critical sections of the city with barbed wire, armored pig carriers crisscrossing the streets, soldiers everywhere, tommy guns pointed at stomach level, smoke curling black against the daylight sky, the smell of cordite, house-to-house searches, doors being kicked in, the commonness of death."

== Research ==
=== Johnson (2018) ===
Studying patriotism towards the United States among African Americans, Micah E. Johnson identified a subset of the African American population which he termed "subverters". Johnson describes subverters as African Americans who reject patriotism for the United States, due to the racial inequality present in the country.

Music video depicting the desecration of an American flag by several African American men

During the study, one subverter expressed

"American patriotism glorifies a world that doesn’t exist. The idea is that all Americans benefit from their rights to liberty, life, and justice for all, but this is a false ideal because everyone isn’t allotted to those rights in America. I’m not patriotic because I don’t feel there is anything to love about this country that globalizes imperialism and capitalism crippling every nation it comes across."

=== YouGov (2022) ===
In a 2022 survey of 1,000 American adults by YouGov, 12% of African American respondents described themselves as "not very patriotic", while 9% of African American respondents described themselves as "not patriotic at all".

== See also ==
- African-American culture
- African-American history
- Afrophobia – Fear or hatred of African people
- Anti-Black racism – Discrimination against Black people and culture
- Racism against African Americans
- Racism in the United States
- Double consciousness – Concept in social philosophy
- Black nationalism – Ideology that seeks to develop a Black national identity
- Black power – Political slogan and ideology
- Black Power movement – 1960s to 1980s African-American social movement
  - Black Panther Party – American political organization (1966–1982)
- Black separatism – Movement for separate institutions
- Black supremacy – Belief in superiority of black people
- American exceptionalism – Idea of the United States as unique nation
