= Chesapeake rebellion =

1730 colonial American slave rebellion

Chesapeake Rebellion
- Part of the Slave Revolts in North America
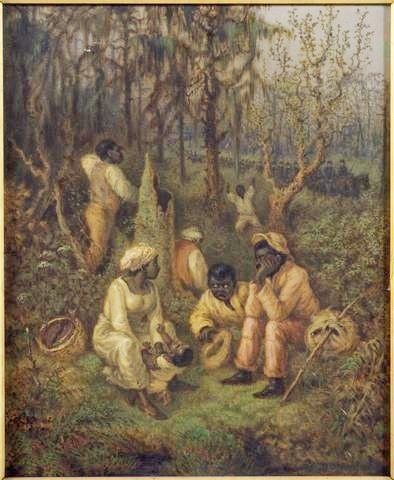
- Escaped slaves in the Great Dismal Swamp, where many fled after the suppression of the revolt
- Date: 1730
- Location: Princess Anne County, Virginia
- Caused by: Slavery, mistaken belief that King George II had emancipated the slaves
- Goals: Liberation
- Result: Suppression

Parties
Rebel slaves	Colonial Government of Virginia; Native American groups

Number
200 or more	

The Chesapeake rebellion of 1730 was the largest slave rebellion of the colonial period in North America. Believing that Virginian planters had disregarded a royal edict from King George II which freed baptized slaves, 200 slaves (many or most of them Kongolese Catholics recently arrived from West Africa) gathered in Princess Anne County, Virginia, in October, electing captains and demanding that Governor William Gooch honor the supposed edict. White planters stopped these meetings, arresting some slaves and forcing others to flee. Although hundreds of slaves fled to the Great Dismal Swamp, they were immediately hunted down by the authorities and their Indigenous allies.

== Background ==
=== Rumor of royal emancipation ===
In the early fall of 1730, a rumor spread among African slaves that King George II of Great Britain had issued an order to free all baptized slaves in the American colonies. The exact source of the rumor was unknown, but it was believed to originate among slaves since colonial officials were not able to explain its origin and no such order had been issued. James Blair, the commissary of the Virginia Colony, described the cause of rebellion as following in his letter to Bishop of London, Edmund Gibson: "There was a general rumor among them that they were to be set free. And when they saw nothing of it they grew angry and saucy, and met in the night time in great numbers, and talked of rising."

=== Religion ===
==== Kongo Christians and Virginia law ====
The slaves present in the Chesapeake region were in large part recently enslaved from the Bakongo region in West Africa, part of the larger Kingdom of Kongo, which had been converted to Catholicism by the Portuguese in the 15th century. As a result, many of the African slaves in Virginia were in fact already Christians before coming under British colonial rule. According to some historians, most of the enslaved people imported to Virginia between 1710 and 1740 were Kongolese.

Beginning in the 1660s, the Virginia legislature had repeatedly passed laws that confirmed that conversion to Christianity did not change a slave's hereditary status. Although slaves sought to gain freedom because of their faith or after converting to Christianity in Virginia, slave-holders and colonial officials did not share the same opinion. In September 1667, the Virginia officials passed the following law to prevent baptized slaves from gaining freedom:

September 1667 Whereas some doubts have risen whether children that are slaves by birth, and by the charity and piety of their owners made partakers of the blessed sacrament of baptism, should by virtue of their baptism be made free, it is enacted and declared by this Grand Assembly, and the authority thereof, that the conferring of baptism does not alter the condition of the person as to his bondage or freedom; that diverse masters, freed from this doubt may more carefully endeavor the propagation of Christianity by permitting children, through slaves, or those of greater growth if capable, to be admitted to that sacrament.

==== Spanish sanctuary ====
As early as 1693, Spain offered sanctuary in Spanish Florida to fugitive slaves from the Thirteen Colonies who converted to Catholicism. However, news of this policy did not spread northward until the late 1730s, but still inspired many enslaved Africans from North Carolina to Boston to seek freedom in Spanish Florida. Spain would keep this policy in place for as long as it held the territory, only amending it to remove any compensation to owners of runaway slaves and stipulate that fugitive slaves had to serve a four-year term of service to the colonial militia.

==== Religious revival ====
Religious revivalism and the Great Awakening in the 18th century forced colonists to rethink worship and also kindled greater interest in the conversion of slaves. In 1724, in response to a questionnaire sent by Bishop of London on the conversion of infidels, eleven out of twenty-eight of the respondents noted that they were interested in obtaining slave conversions. Despite a relatively-high portion of Anglican clergymen expressed interest in bringing African slaves into Anglican churches, baptized Africans were not treated equally in comparison to whites in even the most aggressive clergyman's parish, in order to maintain the hierarchical relationship between masters and slaves. Baptized slaves believed that slavery was not compatible with Christianity, triggering rebellion.

Many slave owners at the time feared that a slave's conversion to Christianity could infringe on property rights as referring to chattel slavery, and slaves themselves hoped that Christianity, whether through African tradition or conversion, might lead to their freedom. In the years leading up to 1730, slaveholders had failed to convince slaves that Christianity was compatible with slavery.

== Rebellion ==
The aforementioned practices of inequality outraged baptized slaves, especially Kongolese Catholics, who genuinely believed the king had set them free. They planned their insurrection on a Sunday morning in October, when the whites were attending Protestant church meetings. 200 slaves gathered in Princess Anne County, Virginia, electing captains and demanding that Governor William Gooch honor the supposed royal edict. White planters stopped the meetings, arresting some slaves and forcing others to flee. The activities of the enslaved also reportedly featured violent "outrages" against the whites. Although hundreds of slaves fled to the Great Dismal Swamp, they were immediately hunted down by the authorities and their Pasquotank allies.

=== Native Americans and Fugitive Slave Clause ===
The rebellion was successfully suppressed in a short time period due to help from indigenous tribes. Since early 1700s, concerns of slave insurrection led colonial officials to seek help from Native Americans. Attempts were made many times with different outcomes. The Haudenosaunee had long been asked by colonial officials to return the fugitive Blacks that they had heard were among them, but without result; the Iroquois stated many times that returning fugitives was not part of their jurisdiction. On the other hand, the Cherokee agreed to a fugitive slave clause in a treaty signed in 1730 with representatives of the Commissioners for Trade and Plantations.

Fleeing through the Great Dismal Swamp, the slaves faced confrontation by the local native groups, who assisted in the capture of many of the participants.

== Aftermath ==
The aftermath of the 1730 rebellion greatly reduced efforts for large-scale insurrections, as increased slave surveillance limited their ability to organize, and for many years after slave owners opposed religious conversion or gatherings out of fear such gatherings could spark more revolts. Despite this, religious upheaval in the colonies, much sponsored by George Whitefield, encouraged slave owners to allow their slaves to attend services and join various churches by the early 1740s.
