= Slave Life in Georgia =

1855 memoir by John Brown

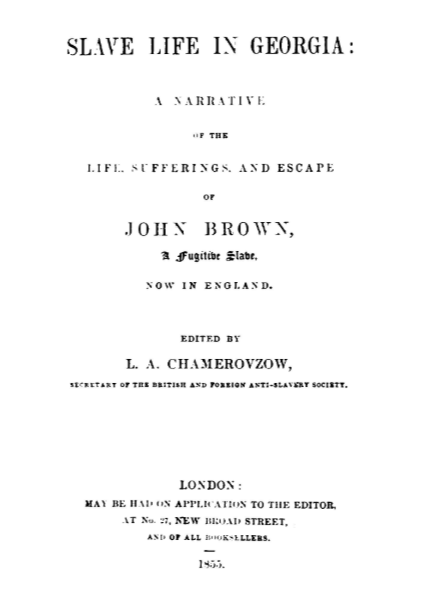
- Title page for Slave Life in Georgia (1855)
- Author: John Brown with Louis Alexis Chamerovzow
- Language: en
- Publisher: W. M. Watts, London
- Publication date: 1855
- Publication place: United Kingdom
- LC Class: E444 .B87

Slave life in Georgia: a narrative of the life, sufferings, and escape of John Brown, a fugitive slave, now in England is an 1855 American fugitive slave narrative written by John Brown with the editorial assistance of a British anti-slavery society and published in England. Published in the wake of Harriet Beecher Stowe's abolitionist blockbusters Uncle Tom's Cabin and A Key to Uncle Tom's Cabin, Brown states "Mrs. Stowe has told something about Slavery. I think she must know a great deal more than she has told. I know more than I dare to tell." Indeed, when describing the prison of slave trader Theophilus Freeman, Brown stops short of explicitly describing the sexual abuses that took place therein: "...the youngest and handsomest females were set apart as the concubines of the masters, who generally changed mistresses every week. I could relate, in connection with this part of my subject, some terrible things I know of, that happened, and lay bare some most frightful scenes of immorality and vice which I witnessed; but I abstain, for reasons which my readers will, I hope, appreciate. I think it only right, however, to mention the above fact, that people may get a glimpse of the dreadful fate which awaits the young slave women who are sold away South, where the slave-pen is only another name for brothel." According to historian Walter Johnson, the explanations of cotton agriculture written by John Brown, Charles Ball, Louis Hughes, and Solomon Northrup were superior to anything published in American Cotton Planter magazine.
