= John Brown (fugitive slave) =

African-American author (1810–1876)

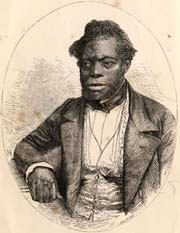
John Brown

John Brown (c. 1810 – 1876), also known by his slave name, "Fed," was born into slavery on a plantation in Southampton County, Virginia. He is known for his memoir published in London, England in 1855, Slave Life in Georgia: A Narrative of the Life, Sufferings, and Escape of John Brown, a Fugitive Slave, Now in England. This slave narrative, dictated to a helper who wrote it, recounted his life and later escape from slavery in Georgia. He lived in London from 1850 to the end of his life, marrying an English woman.

== Life ==
Born in Southampton County, Virginia, to slave parents Joe and Nancy (called Nanny), Fed grew up with his twin siblings, Silas and Lucy. They lived on the plantation of Betty Moore, his mother's mistress. He later recalled seeing their father Joe only once, when he was allowed to see the family. His father was held by a planter named Benford in Northampton County. Fed's paternal grandfather had been stolen from Africa, and he was of the Eboe (Igbo) tribe.

After his father's master moved with Joe from the area, Fed's mother was forced to take another husband. He was known as Lamb and was held by a nearby planter and miller known as Collier. Nancy had three more children with him: Curtis, Iraene, and Cain. Fed and his family all lived in a two-room cabin, with the other room occupied by his mother's niece Annike and her children.

According to the will of Moore's husband, when the last of their three daughters married, the "slave property" was to be divided equally among her and the three daughters. There were more than 100 slaves to be divided among the four. Having to leave much family behind, Fed, his mother and brother Curtis were assigned to the lot of the second daughter and her husband, James Davis, and forced to walk to their plantation at Northampton. When Fed was about ten, Davis sold him to a slave trader eager for slaves to take to Georgia, which was rapidly developing. He was sold for about $310 and separated forever from his mother.

In Georgia, Fed was sold to planter Thomas Stevens, a man of Welsh descent, who had a cotton plantation and whiskey still near Milledgeville. He was the maternal grandfather of Mary Ann Harris Gay. She published two works in the late 19th century, a memoir about Atlanta during the Civil War and a novel about antebellum plantation life, set first in Mississippi.

Fed worked under Stevens for more than 15 years, and described the man as "savage" in his treatment. He detailed Stevens' cruel treatment and regular physical abuse of him and other slaves over the years. After several attempts, Fed escaped, taking the name of John Brown.

Brown made his way North, working in various places. He sailed to England in 1850, as the new Fugitive Slave Law passed in the United States increased enforcement against fugitive slaves even in free states. He did not want to be taken back into slavery. In London, Brown worked as a carpenter. There he contacted the British and Foreign Anti-Slavery Society to tell his story. In 1855 he dictated a memoir to the society's secretary, Louis Alexis Chamerovzow. It was published in London as Slave Life in Georgia: A Narrative of the Life, Sufferings, and Escape of John Brown, a Fugitive Slave, Now in England. Brown's is one of numerous slave narratives published before and after the Civil War.

Brown married a local Englishwoman. He remained in London until his death, earning a living as a herbalist. He died in London in 1876.

In 2024 Dorset Museum had a display about Brown based on research carried out by Jordan Cole, a student from Bath Spa University. Brown had lived in Dorchester where the museum is located, between 1865 and 1870, and lectured on his experiences of slavery at the Corn Exchange near the museum.

== See also ==
- List of slaves

== Books ==
- Brown, John (1855), and Chamerovzow, Louis (ed.). Slave Life in Georgia: A Narrative of the Life, Sufferings, and Escape of John Brown, a Fugitive Slave, Now in England, London: W.M. Watts.
- Fradin, Dennis B. (October 16, 2000). Bound for the North Star: True Stories of Fugitive Slaves. Houghton Mifflin Harcourt. ISBN 0395970172.
- Brown, John (1855), and Chamerovzow, Louis (ed.).Slave Life in Georgia: A Narrative of the Life, Sufferings, and Escape of John Brown, a Fugitive Slave, Now in England. Narrated in 1855 by John Brown to I. A. Chamerovzow. Preface by I. A. Chamerovzow. Published in 1972 by Beehive Press. Reprinted in 1991 by Beehive Press with a revised introduction by F. N. Boney. https://beehivefoundation.org/product/slave-life-in-georgia/
