= Creole mutiny =

1841 slave-ship seizure

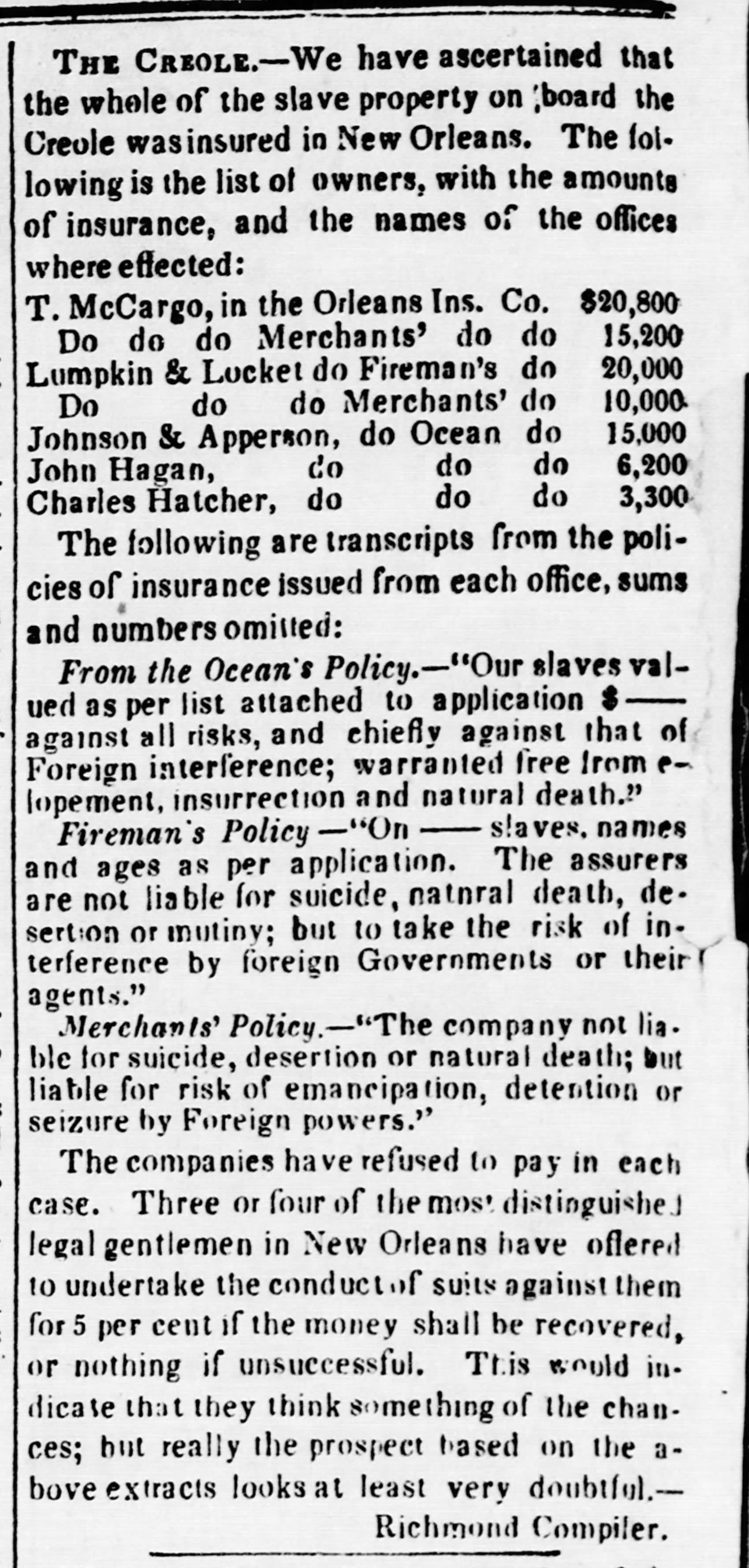
"The Creole (Richmond Compiler)" Alexandria Gazette, December 20, 1841

The Creole Mutiny, sometimes called the Creole case, was a slave revolt aboard the American slave ship Creole in November 1841, when the brig was seized by the 128 slaves who were aboard the ship when it reached Nassau in the British colony of the Bahamas, where slavery had been abolished. The brig was transporting enslaved people as part of the coastwise slave trade in the American South. It has been described as “the most successful [antebellum] slave revolt in US history.” Two died in the revolt, an enslaved person and a member of the crew.

The United Kingdom had abolished the slave trade with the Slave Trade Act in 1807, and the practice of slavery throughout the British Empire in 1833. Accordingly, British officials in the Bahamas ruled that the enslaved people on Creole were freed after their arrival in Nassau, if they chose to stay. Nineteen men who were identified as being responsible for the revolt were imprisoned on charges of mutiny; an Admiralty Court hearing in April 1842 ruled that the men had been illegally held captive as slaves and had the right to use force to gain freedom.

When the Creole reached New Orleans in December 1841 with three enslaved women and two enslaved children aboard (who had refused to leave the ship), Southerners were outraged about the loss of property; calls for compensation ensued. Relations between the United States and Britain were strained for a time. The incident occurred during negotiations for the Webster–Ashburton Treaty of 1842 but was not directly addressed. The parties settled on seven crimes qualifying for extradition in the treaty, but they did not include slave revolts. Eventually claims for losses of slaves from Creole and two other American ships transporting enslaved persons were repaid to their owners, along with other claims dating to 1814, in a treaty of 1853 between the United States and Britain, for which an arbitration commission awarded settlements in 1855 against each nation.

== Background and revolt ==
In the fall of 1841, the American brig Creole, owned by Johnson and Eperson of Richmond, Virginia, was transporting 135 enslaved African-Americans for sale in New Orleans, a major market in the American South for slaves. 103 of those who would be transported on Creole were being kept in slave pens at Richmond, while another 32 were purchased at Hampton Roads for transport. Most of the slaves were owned by Johnson and Eperson. 26 people were owned by Thomas McCargo, who operated as a slave trader and was one of the passengers on board. While the United States government had abolished the transatlantic slave trade in 1807, it permitted the domestic trading of slaves among the states which kept slavery legalized; a "coastwise slave trade" had sprung up in the 19th century, transporting enslaved African-Americans among the American South. Creole also carried tobacco, a crew of ten, the captain's wife, daughter and niece; four white passengers, including slave traders; and eight enslaved black servants, for a total of 160 individuals on board.

Madison Washington, the leader of the revolt, had been born into slavery but managed to escape to Canada. However, he was forced back into slavery after returning to Virginia to look for his wife, who was among those being transported to New Orleans to be sold as slaves. The enslaved persons were kept in the forward hold, but Washington managed to gain access to the deck after one of the crew had lifted the grate. On November 7, 1841, Washington and eighteen other enslaved men rebelled; they overpowered the crew and killed John R. Hewell, one of the slave traders, with a knife. The crew and passengers had only one gun among them - which they never used. The captain, who was wounded, joined two of the crew who had gone up into the rigging to escape the fighting. One of the enslaved persons was badly wounded and later died. Some other members of the crew were wounded but all survived.

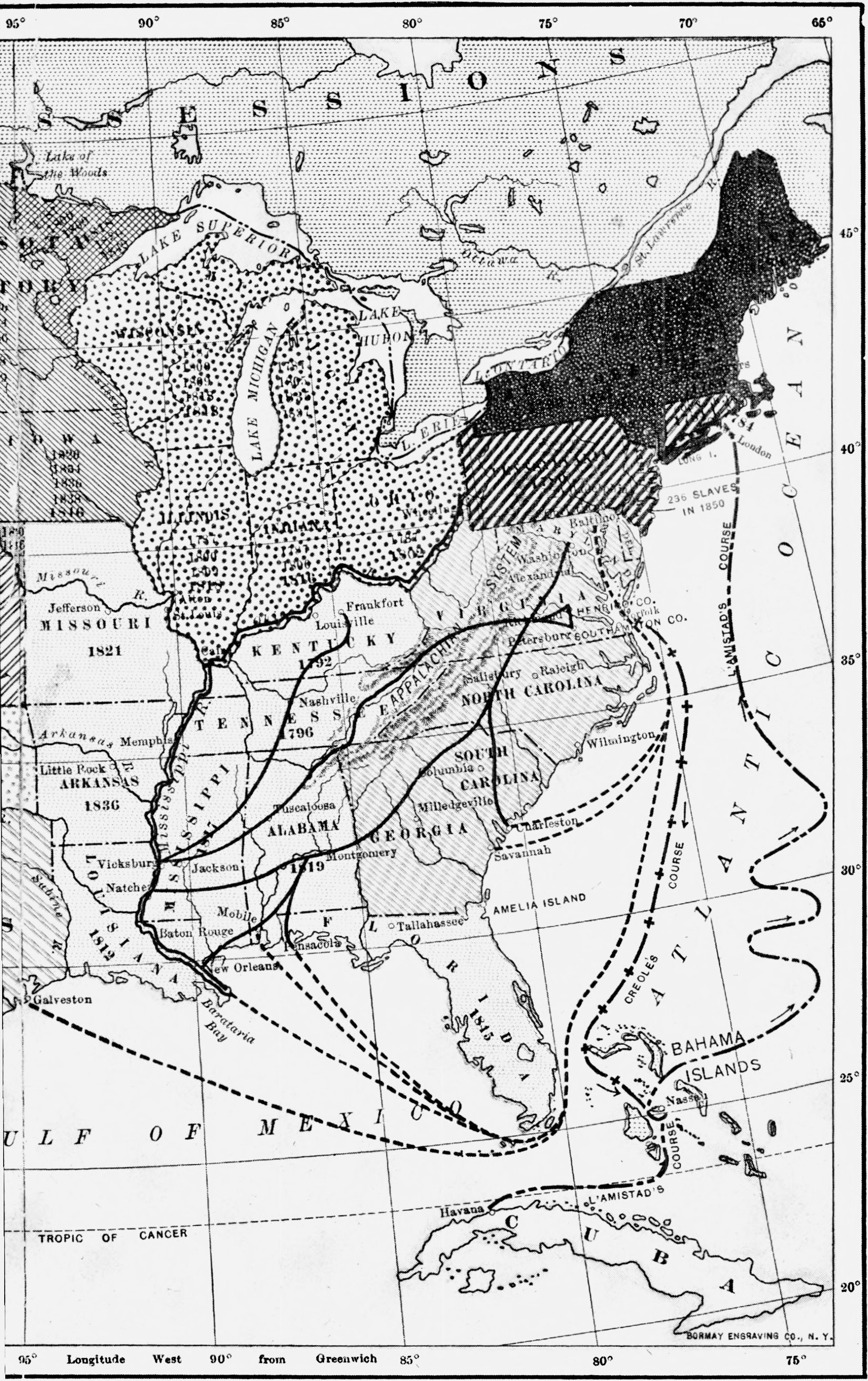
Map of slavery and slave trade in the United States 1830–1850 by Albert Bushnell Hart (1906), showing route of the Creole

The enslaved people demanded that plantation overseer William Merritt navigate the ship for them, which he promised to do. They first demanded that the ship be taken to Liberia, which the American Colonization Society had established as a colony for freed African-Americans in West Africa. Merritt informed them that the voyage was impossible as the ship did not have enough food or water for the journey. Another leader of the revolt, Ben Blacksmith, said they should be taken to the British West Indies, as he knew the enslaved people from the Hermosa had gained their freedom there the previous year.

== Arrival in Nassau ==
On November 9, 1841, the Creole reached Nassau, where it was boarded by the harbor pilot and his crew, all local black Bahamians. They told the enslaved people who had been held on board, under Bahamian colonial law, they were free. The crew advised them to go ashore at once. The Bahamian Quarantine Officer came aboard. As the captain Robert Ensor was badly wounded, the officer took First Mate Zephaniah Gifford to the American consulate to inform the American consul of the events which had transpired. At the consul's request, the governor of the Bahamas ordered a group of soldiers to board the Creole to prevent the escape of the men implicated in Hewell's death. Fearing the British authorities would attempt to free the enslaved people being transported on Creole as per their laws, the American consul attempted to organize a group of American sailors on the island to take back control of the ship. He intended to have them sail the ship out of British jurisdiction with the enslaved people still aboard. The group of American sailors approached the ship on November 12, intending to sail it away, but they were foiled by a Bahamian who shouted a warning to the officer of the soldiers aboard the Creole. He threatened to order his men to fire into the boat of the Americans so they withdrew.

After an investigation by magistrates, on Friday, 13 November 1841, the Bahamian Attorney-General went aboard. He told the nineteen rebels that they would be imprisoned. He informed the remainder of the enslaved people of their new circumstances: "You are free, and at liberty to go onshore, and wherever you please." A fleet of small boats manned by locals, who until then had surrounded the brig at a distance, immediately came forward. The Attorney-General warned the people against boarding the Creole, but said they could provide passage to the enslaved persons who wished to go ashore. Most did so, although three women, a young girl and boy stayed in hiding on board. They eventually sailed with the ship to New Orleans and were sold as slaves. The New Providence authorities arranged for a ship bound for Jamaica, also a British colony, to take the passengers to the island for free, and announced it in the local newspaper. Numerous enslaved people from the Creole left for Jamaica aboard it. After the Bahamian colonial government arrested the conspirators, the United States government dropped its claims for all the enslaved people to be returned to its custody. There was no extradition treaty at the time between Britain and the United States governing such circumstances.

The British authorities determined that the people who had been enslaved had not committed any breach of British or maritime law. As under British law they were free men, they were considered to have the right to use force to escape the detention of illegal enslavement. The Admiralty Court in Nassau held a special session in April to consider a charge of piracy against the men implicated in the mutiny. Ruling that their action was not piracy, the Court ordered the 17 men (two had died in the interim) to be released on April 16, 1842. As a total of 128 people who had been held as slaves gained their freedom, the case has been described as the "most successful slave revolt in US history".

The Creole had departed months before for the United States, reaching its original destination of New Orleans on December 2, 1841. Five people were still aboard, outraging planters and politicians who learned that the remaining people had been freed from slavery by the British authorities. The case attracted national attention in the United States and provoked a diplomatic controversy. In Boston in 1842, abolitionist William E. Channing published a pamphlet, "The Duty of the Free States or Remarks Suggested by the Case of the 'Creole'", to refute claims by Southern politicians that the human property of American slave owners should be protected in foreign ports. The issue was also under discussion due to negotiations over the Webster-Ashburton Treaty, which was ratified with the United Kingdom that year. Less than a year later, the Creole was wrecked in a violent storm while in harbor at Funchal, Madeira.

== Political consequences ==
The Creole case generated diplomatic tension between the United Kingdom and the United States and caused political rumblings within the United States. Southerners were outraged to have lost "property" in another instance of British authorities freeing the enslaved persons from American ships that had gone into their ports in the Caribbean. The John Tyler administration supported Southerners in seeking the return of the enslaved people to captivity.

Secretary of State Daniel Webster stated the US position to the United Kingdom that the enslaved people were legal property of US citizens and demanded their return.

The United Kingdom had abolished slavery effective August 1834, and it rejected the U.S. claim. It had advised all nations that under its law, ships that went into its ports would forfeit any people who were enslaved on board. The British government said that Nassau was a British territory where British law must be applied. Under it, the 'slaves' aboard the Creole were to be considered free passengers. Accordingly, unless they could be proved to have broken local or maritime law, it would be false imprisonment to hold them against their will.

The abolitionist Charles Sumner argued that enslaved people "became free men when taken, by the voluntary action of their owners, beyond the jurisdiction of the slave states." In March 1842 US Representative Joshua Reed Giddings of Ohio introduced a series of nine resolutions on this topic, arguing against the federal government acting on behalf of the slaveholders. He argued that Virginia state law did not apply to enslaved persons who were outside Virginian waters, the federal government had no part in it, and the coastwise slave trade was unconstitutional, as enslaved people were beyond state law on the high seas, and thus free people.

Southerners in the House of Representatives disagreed with his position. The members censured Giddings by a large margin for violating an informal gag rule that had been in effect since 1836, barring discussion of slavery in the House. He promptly resigned. When the Ohio legislature held a special election in May 1842 for his seat, the voters of Ohio overwhelmingly reelected Giddings, by 7,469 to 383.

Encouraged by the outcome of the Creole revolt, abolitionists renewed their political attacks on slavery and the coastwise trade. In the newspaper article, "The Hero Mutineers," Madison Washington was named the 'romantic hero.' Washington was said to have shown sympathy toward the white crew members on the Creole by preventing others who had been enslaved from killing all of them when they made a last effort to regain control and as such, their freedom. He was said to have personally dressed sailors' wounds after the revolt.

The case roused strong feelings on both sides of the Atlantic, as the events occurred during the negotiations related to the Webster-Ashburton Treaty of 1842 between the two nations, primarily to settle the borders between the US and Canada, a British colony. According to the New York Courier and Inquirer, Daniel Webster, as Secretary of State, wrote to Lord Ashburton, then in Washington, DC:

The Creole case is presented in strong terms by Mr Webster in a letter (which, when published, will bring all the anti-slavery people about his ears)..." To this Lord Ashburton replied that as the case had effectively arisen after his departure from England he was 'not empowered to treat upon the subject'. He reaffirmed the position that as slavery was no longer recognized under British law, any foreign person (enslaved) arriving in British possessions was automatically considered as free – as was also the case in those American states that did not recognize slavery. He did however promise that British officials in the West Indies would be given 'directions'...'to do nothing in this respect when it can be properly avoided' in the interests of 'good neighbourhood'.

Among other declarations, the Webster-Ashburton Treaty called for a final end to the slave trade (profiting from the sale and suffering of human beings) on the high seas, to be enforced by both signatories.

Seven lawsuits were lodged against insurance companies in Louisiana by the slaveowners who had experienced financial losses due to the revolt, as the insurance companies initially refused to compensate them. Most of these insurance cases were consolidated and eventually heard by the Louisiana State Supreme Court.^{Result?}

== Earlier cases ==
The Comet in 1830 and the Encomium in 1833 were American ships in the coastwise slave trade that were forced by weather into British ports in the Caribbean while carrying numerous enslaved persons bound for the domestic (slave) market in New Orleans. The British freed both groups. Britain eventually paid compensation for these seizures, as it had not yet abolished slavery in its territories.

When Parliament abolished slavery in its territories in 1833, Britain advised other countries that slave ships that put into its ports would forfeit the enslaved persons without compensation. After British abolition of slavery in its colonies, effective in 1834, its officials freed enslaved persons from the Enterprise (1835), and the Hermosa (1840), without compensation.

In 1840, the Hermosa, a US schooner in the coastwise slave trade carrying 38 enslaved people from Richmond to New Orleans for sale, went aground on one of the Abacos islands in the Bahamas. After wreckers took the ship to port, the captain refused to let the enslaved persons off and with the US consul, tried to arrange for another ship to take and deliver the enslaved persons to the United States. British magistrates backed with armed force went onto the Hermosa, removing the enslaved people and freeing them when they reached the port. The Americans protested. The Enterprise and Hermosa cases were submitted for arbitration under an 1853 claims treaty and, together with claims for the Creole and a variety of other unrelated claims dating to 1814, Britain paid a settlement in 1855 to the United States for these three cases. A total of nearly 450 American enslaved persons achieved freedom due to British colonies' actions in these five cases.

== Compensation ==
After years of discussion, the United Kingdom and the United States signed a February 1853 Treaty of Claims which articles included the claims of slave-owners who had suffered financially through the British emancipation of slaves in the Enterprise (1835), Hermosa (1840) and Creole incidents. A claims commission met in London from September 15, 1853, to January 15, 1855, to settle the amount of total awards covered under this treaty, which extended to a variety of claims dating from December 1814. In February 1855, Congress passed a bill accepting the commission's settlement and appropriating funds for the US payment required.

== Related incidents ==
British officials may have been warned off liberating enslaved people from US ships but citizens sometimes acted independently. In 1855 the New York Times reported that an enslaved American person had been removed by Jamaicans from the brig Young America at Savanna-la-Mar and "set at large". Although the action was taken by private individuals and not officials, the paper noted the potential for future conflict between the nations, and called for a lasting solution to be found by "the two governments interested".

== In popular culture ==
- In 1852 the noted abolitionist Frederick Douglass published a novella called The Heroic Slave, featuring Washington and inspired by the Creole revolt. He stressed the personal aspects of the slaves' rebellion, placing it firmly within American revolutionary tradition.

== Rebellion leaders and supporters, passengers, and crew on the Creole ==
Leaders of the slave rebellion:

- Madison Washington
- Ben Blacksmith (Johnstone)
- Elijah Morris
- Doc Ruffin

Supporters:

- Pompey Garrison
- George Portlock
- Tyler
- Addison
- T. Smallwood
- William Glover
- America Woodis
- George Benton
- Adam Carney
- Reuben Knight
- Jordan Philips

Officers:

- Robert Ensor, of Richmond, VA, captain, wounded
- Zephaniah C. Gifford, first mate, wounded
- Lucius Stevens, second mate

Crew:

- William Devereux, free man of color, cook and steward
- Blinn Curtis, Owls Head, Maine, wounded
- Francis Foxwell
- Jacques Lacombe, Leconte or Lecompte, French helmsman
- Jacob Leitener, Prussian cook
- John Silvy (Antonio)
- Henry Sperk or Speck

Passengers:

- "Lewis" an old servant who was enslaved, belonging to Thomas McCargo
- Captain's wife, baby and niece
- John R. Hewell, slave trader, killed
- Thomas McCargo, slave trader
- Theophilus J. D. McCargo, nephew of Thomas
- William Henry Merritt, slave trader
- Jacob Miller

== Giddings's Resolutions ==
Joshua Giddings introduced these resolutions in Congress in 1842 and was censured for opening debate on slavery in defiance of a ruling against it. He resigned and returned to his home state of Ohio, where he was quickly re-elected by his constituents in a special election. He soon returned to Congress.

1. Resolved, That, prior to the Adoption of the Federal Constitution, each of the several States composing this Union exercised full and exclusive jurisdiction over the subject of slavery within its own territory, and possessed full power to continue or abolish it at pleasure.
2. Resolved, That, by adopting the Constitution, no part of the aforesaid powers were delegated to the Federal Government, but were reserved by and still pertain to each of the several States.
3. Resolved, That, by the 8th section of the 1st article of the Constitution, each of the several States surrendered to the Federal Government all jurisdiction over the subjects of commerce and navigation upon the high seas.
4. Resolved. That slavery, being an abridgment of the natural rights of man, can exist only by force of positive municipal law, and is necessarily confined to the territorial jurisdiction of the power creating it.
5. Resolved, That when a ship belonging to the citizens of any State of the Union leaves the waters and territory of such State, and enters upon the high seas, the persons on board cease to be subject to the slave laws of such State, and therefore are governed in their relations to each other by, and are amenable to, the laws of the United States.
6. Resolved, That when the brig Creole, on her late passage for New Orleans, left the territorial jurisdiction of Virginia, the slave laws of that State ceased to have jurisdiction over the persons on board such brig, and such persons became amenable only to the laws of the United States.
7. Resolved, That the persons on board the said ship, in resuming their natural rights of personal liberty, violated no law of the United States, incurred no legal responsibility, and are justly liable to no punishment.
8. Resolved, That all attempts to regain possession of or to re-enslave said persons are unauthorized by the Constitution or laws of the United States, and are incompatible with our national honor.
9. Resolved, That all attempts to exert our national influence in favor of the coastwise slave trade, or to place this nation in the attitude of maintaining a "commerce in human beings", are subversive to the rights and injurious to the feelings of the free States, are unauthorized by the Constitution, and prejudicial to our national character.

== See also ==
- Decatur slave-ship mutiny
