= Coastwise slave trade =

Part of the United States domestic slave trade

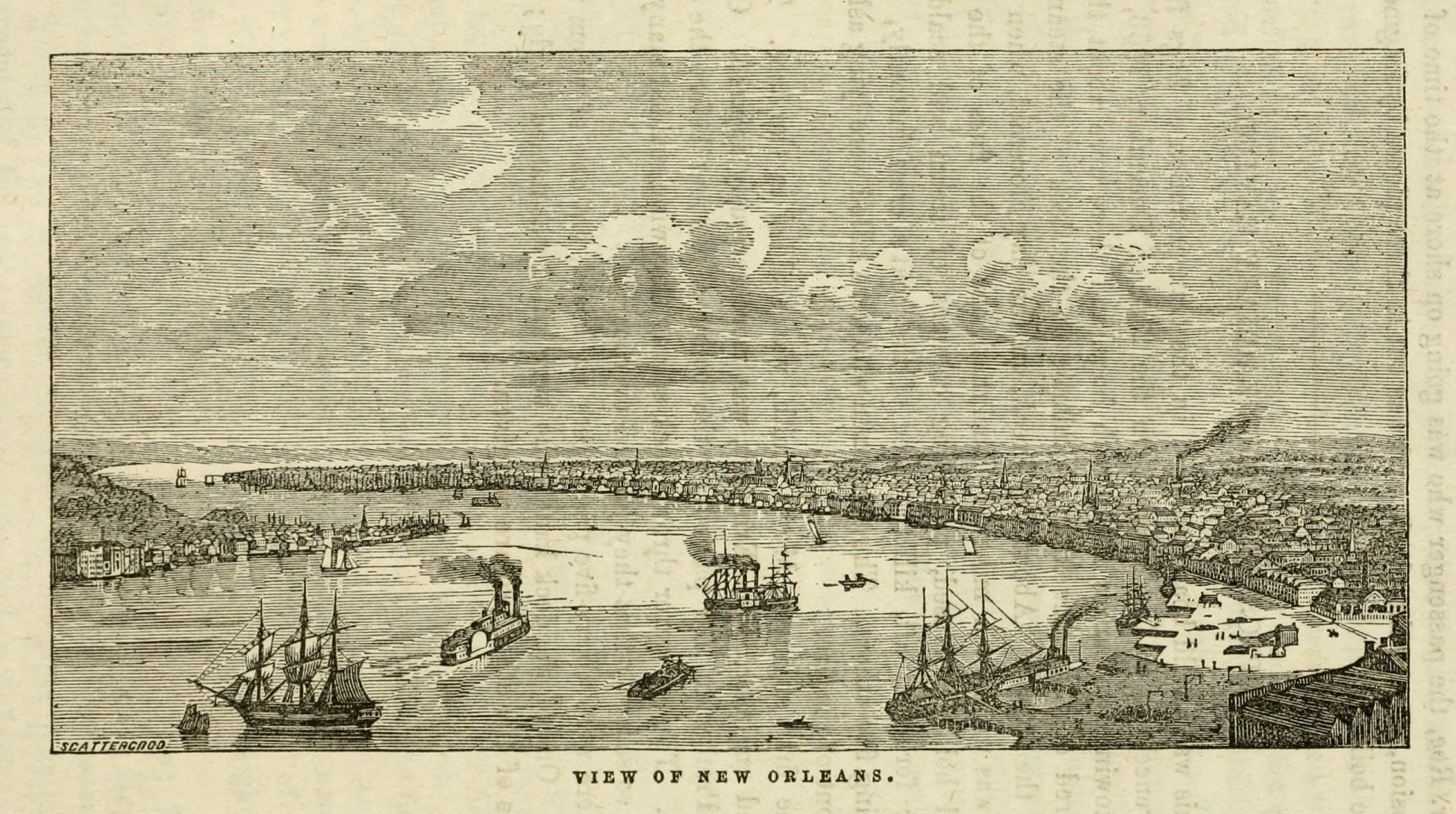
View of the port of New Orleans in the 1850s, etching by Scattergood in Lloyd's Steamboat Directory

The coastwise slave trade existed along the southern and eastern coastal areas of the United States in the antebellum years prior to 1861. Hundreds of vessels of various capacities domestically traded loads of slaves along waterways, generally from the Upper South which had a surplus of slaves to the Deep South where new cotton plantations created high demand for labor.

International tensions developed when ships were forced by weather or incident into ports in Bermuda and the British West Indies, as the British freed the slaves as part of the banned trade on the high seas, even before its abolition of slavery in its territories in 1834. There were several cases: Comet (1830), Encomium (1833), Enterprise (1835), Hermosa (1840), and, most notably, the Creole case of 1841, the result of a ship slave revolt that forced the vessel into Nassau, Bahamas. British officials freed the 128 slaves who chose to stay in the Bahamas.

== Legal rights ==
Prior to 1807, the 1787 United States Constitution and the 1793 Fugitive Slave Act were the only national United States laws on slavery. Individual states had enacted laws authorizing and regulating slavery within their boundaries.

The multi-faceted 1807 Act Prohibiting Importation of Slaves abolished the "importation of slaves" from Africa, effective in 1808. The United States and Great Britain patrolled to create an international Blockade of Africa, trying to suppress the slave trade. In addition, American and British ships patrolled the Caribbean, where illegal slaves were generally brought for sale to the sugar plantations and smuggling into the United States.

The 1807 Act also regulated the United States' "coastwise slave trade"; it protected shipping by domestic slave traders between markets along the other slave trading coasts. Attorneys argued that ships at sea were an extension of United States sovereignty, which permitted domestic slave trade among the states.

== Conflict between the United States and Britain in the Caribbean ==
Complications developed between the United States and Great Britain from their differing interpretations of the application of laws against the slave trade in the Caribbean colonies. When American merchant ships were forced by weather or incident into ports in Bermuda and the British West Indies, the British freed the slaves as part of the banned trade on the high seas, even before its abolition of slavery in its territories in 1834. As early as 1825, the Home Office in London had ruled that "any slave brought to the Bahamas from outside the British West Indies would be manumitted, which led to 300 slaves owned by U.S. nationals being freed." In addition, slaves who escaped to the Bahamas from Florida became free.

Several cases occurred as anti-slavery agitation increased and abolition was passed: Comet (1830), Encomium (1833), Enterprise (1835), and Hermosa (1840) In each case, the British freed the slaves from the ships that had put into ports in Bermuda and the Bahamas, whether by weather or accident.

The most notable case was the 1841 Creole, the result of a ship slave revolt that forced the vessel into Nassau, Bahamas. One of the slave leaders had heard of slaves being freed from the Hermosa there the previous year.

Holding that the slaves were free persons illegally detained in slavery, British officials ultimately freed the 128 of 135 slaves from the Creole who chose to stay in the Bahamas. It has been termed the "most successful slave revolt in U.S. history". The US slaveholders feared this would encourage other slave ship revolts.

== Selected list of laws and court rulings ==
The following are generally considered the most important United States statutory laws and case laws on slavery, in the order of their enactment:

1787: United States Constitution
1793: Fugitive Slave Act
1807: Act Prohibiting Importation of Slaves
1841: United States v. The Amistad
1850: Fugitive Slave Act
1857: Dred Scott v. Sandford
1865: 13th Amendment to the United States Constitution

== Cabotage ==
The act of sailing along a coast and using landmarks for guidance is called cabotage, from the French word caboter ("to coast," "go from cape to cape"). When slaves were the merchandise being transported by cabotage, the practice was called the coastwise slave trade.

== New Statistical Analysis ==
In an important recent study, historians examined more than 24,400 official records of slave transportation from the U.S. National Archives. These records contain information about around 135,000 enslaved people who were transported by sea along the U.S. coast between 1810 and 1861.

The study shows that, unlike what many people believe, professional traders organized much of this trade. Shipowners, middlemen, and brokers worked together to transport enslaved people by force.

== Maritime networks of slave resistance ==
New research shows that ships carrying enslaved people were not only used for transportation but also became places where people resisted slavery and planned escapes. During some voyages, enslaved people shared information and planned rebellions or escapes with help from Black sailors, freed people, and supporters of their cause. These findings show that the sea also played an important role in resistance to slavery.

== The Baltimore to New Orleans Route ==
A study of 365 voyages between Baltimore and New Orleans shows that this was a major route for transporting enslaved people to plantations in the American South. Most of the people transported were teenagers or young adults. Many were sold separately from their families, causing many enslaved families to be broken apart.

== Other cases ==
=== Expansion of the Cotton Economy ===
Historians believe that the coastal slave trade helped the cotton industry grow in the American South. As states like Alabama, Mississippi, and Louisiana needed more workers, thousands of enslaved people were moved from the eastern states to these areas. This forced movement allowed cotton plantations to grow quickly and helped make the United States one of the world's biggest cotton exporters during the 19th century.

=== Acts of 1807 ===
Although the 1807 Act banned bringing enslaved people from Africa, the sale and transport of enslaved people within the United States remained legal, especially by sea. This allowed the slave trade between the eastern and southern states to continue until the Civil War began. Thousands of enslaved people were transported by merchant ships.

=== New Research on the Legacy of Maritime Slavery ===
In recent years, researchers have worked to find and record the remains of ships used in the slave trade. Their work has helped uncover new historical information and examine the social, cultural, and legal effects of slavery. It has also explored how these ships are remembered today and how this history can help achieve justice for the victims and their descendants.

=== Databases ===
In recent years, historical databases have helped researchers study the slave trade more accurately by using statistics. One of the most important resources is the Slave Voyages Project, which has collected information about thousands of ships that carried enslaved people by force. Besides the transatlantic slave trade, the database also has a separate section on the Intra-American Slave Trade. It includes sea routes used to transport enslaved people between ports in the United States, Brazil, and other parts of the Americas.

These records show that the slave trade was not limited to transporting people from Africa to the Americas. After arriving, millions of enslaved people were also moved between different regions of the Americas, where they were forced to work in new places.

=== Customs Documents ===
One of the most important sources for studying the coastal slave trade is ships' customs records. Under U.S. federal law in the early 19th century, ships carrying enslaved people along the coast had to provide lists with details about each person. These details included their age, sex, the owner's or sender's name, and the destination port. Today, these records help researchers learn about the actual people who were forced into the slave trade, rather than relying only on general statistics. Many of these documents are kept in the U.S. National Archives and include hundreds of records from major ports such as Charleston, Savannah, and other important trading centers.

== See also ==
- Enterprise (slave ship)
- Creole case
- United States v. The Amistad (1841)
- Slavery in the United States
- Atlantic Creole
- Bristol slave trade
- Colonial South and the Chesapeake
- Scramble (slave auction)
- Seasoning (slavery)
- Tobacco colonies
