= Washington Robey =

American slave trader (~1799–1841)

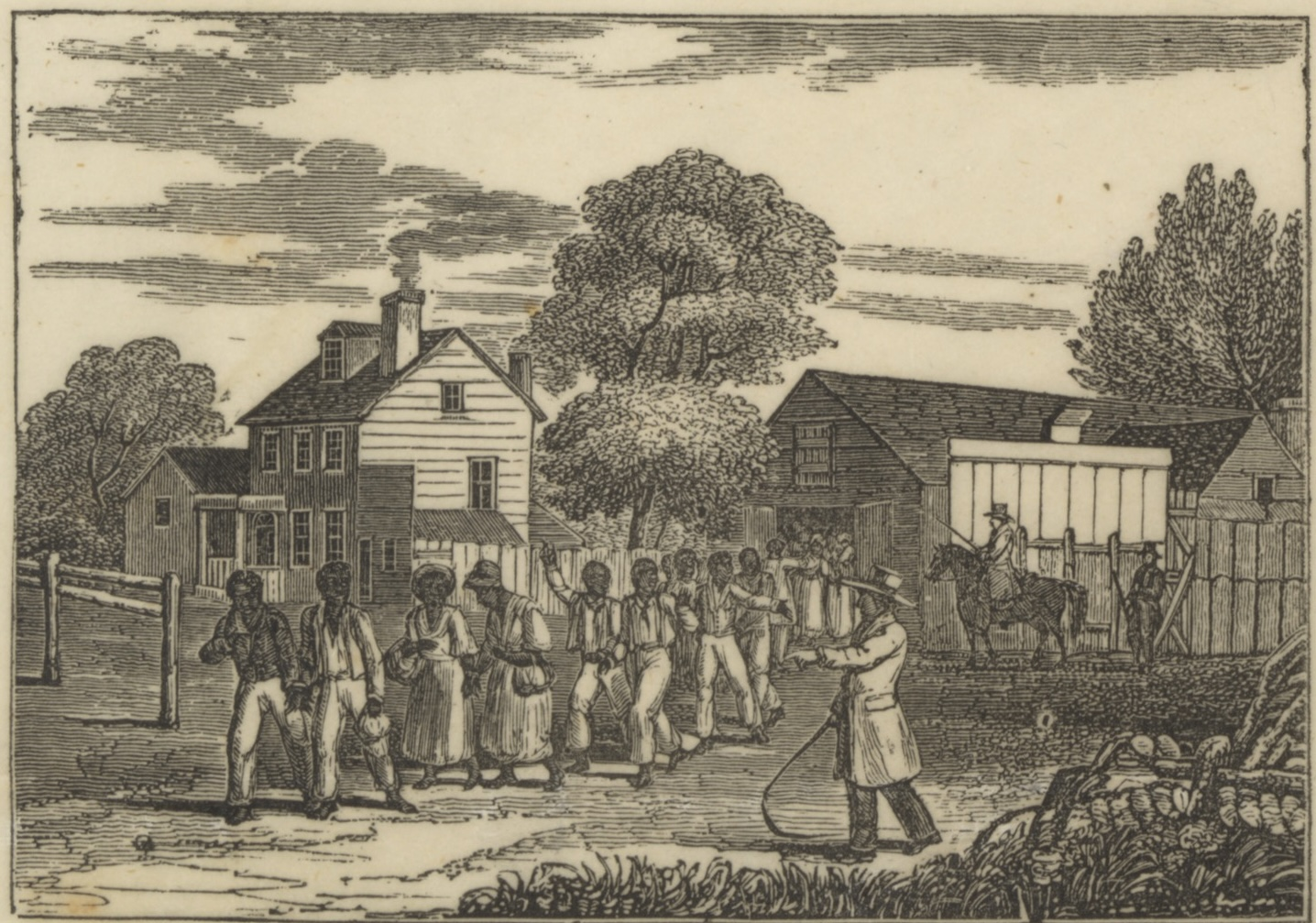
- Washington Robey's tavern and slave jail c. 1836
- Born: c. 1799
- Died: January 1, 1841; District of Columbia
- Occupations: Tavern keeper, livery stable operator, slave trader, slave jail proprietor

Washington Robey (c. 1799 – January 1, 1841), sometimes Washington Robie, was an American tavern keeper, livery stable operator, slave trader, and slave jail proprietor in early 19th-century Washington City, District of Columbia.

== Life and work ==
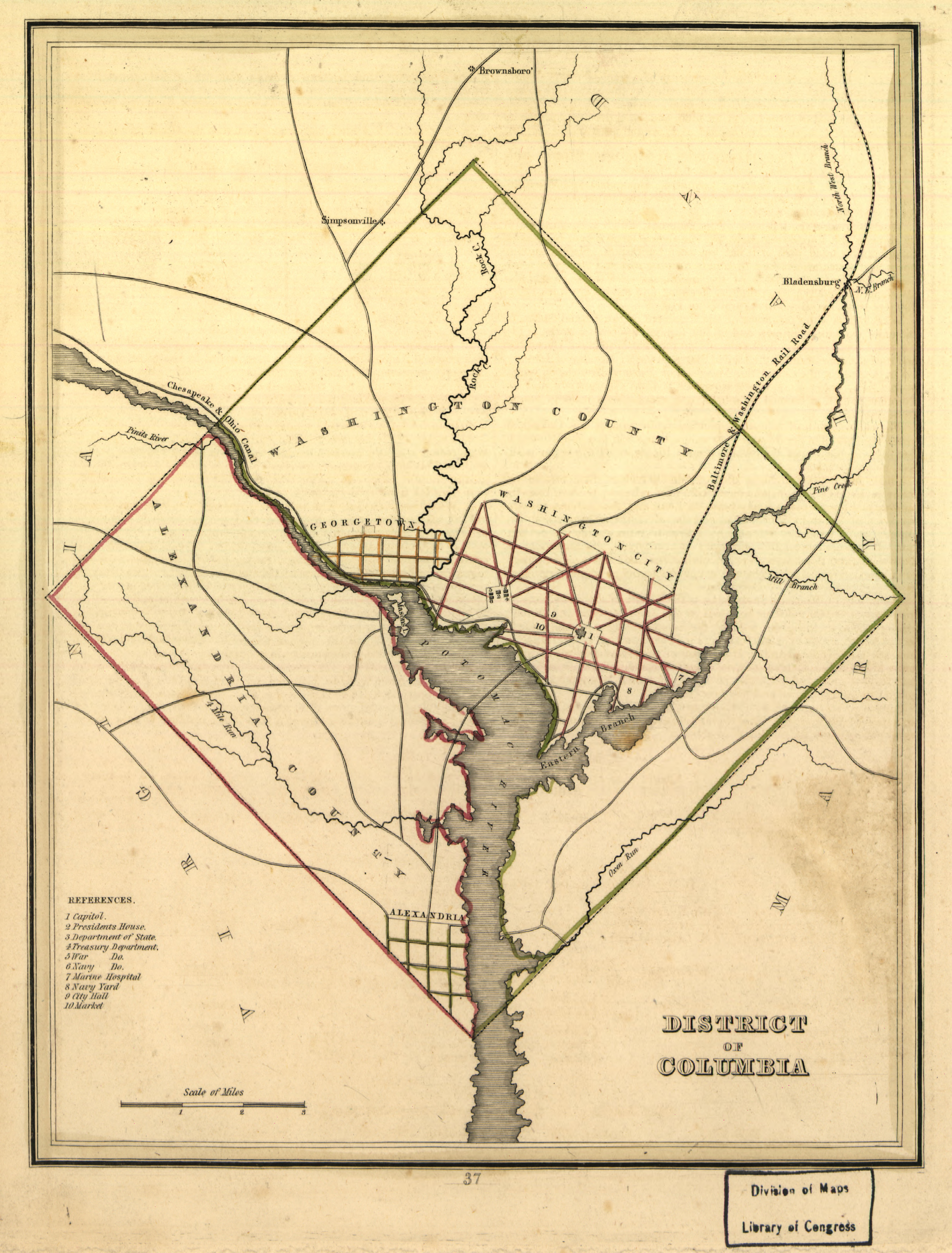
The federal district in 1835, before Alexandria was retroceded to Virginia, showing Alexandria County and Washington County, and Washington City and Georgetown within Washington County

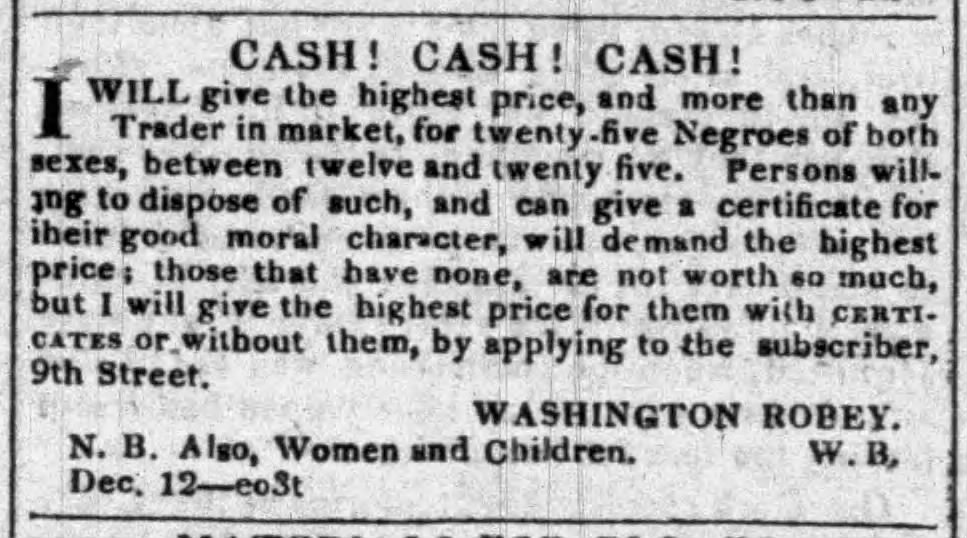
"CASH! CASH! CASH!" Daily National Intelligencer and Washington Express, December 16, 1829

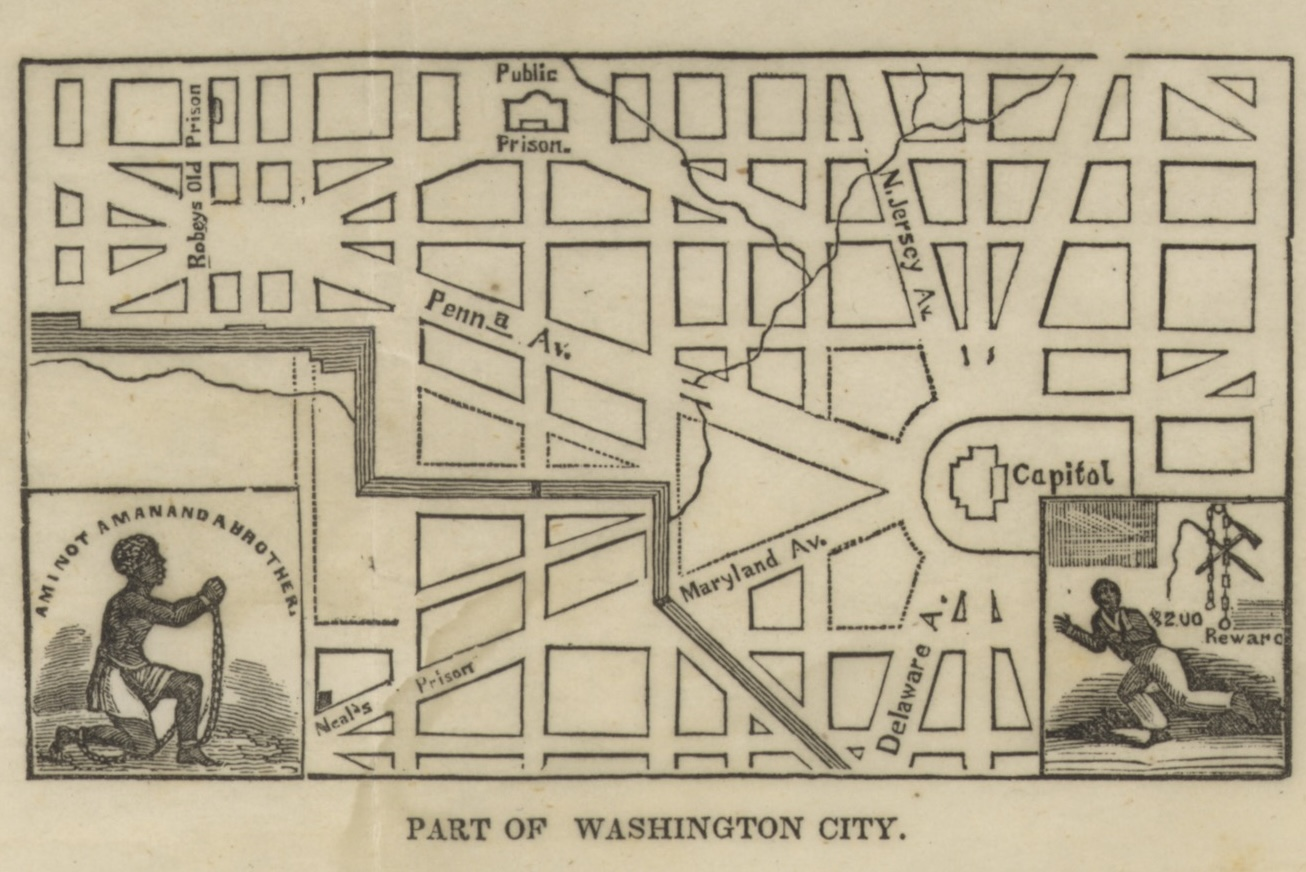
Robey's 7th and 9th Street taverns and slave jails were pictured on this 1836 map produced by the American Anti-Slavery Society; the 7th Street property is listed as Neal's Jail

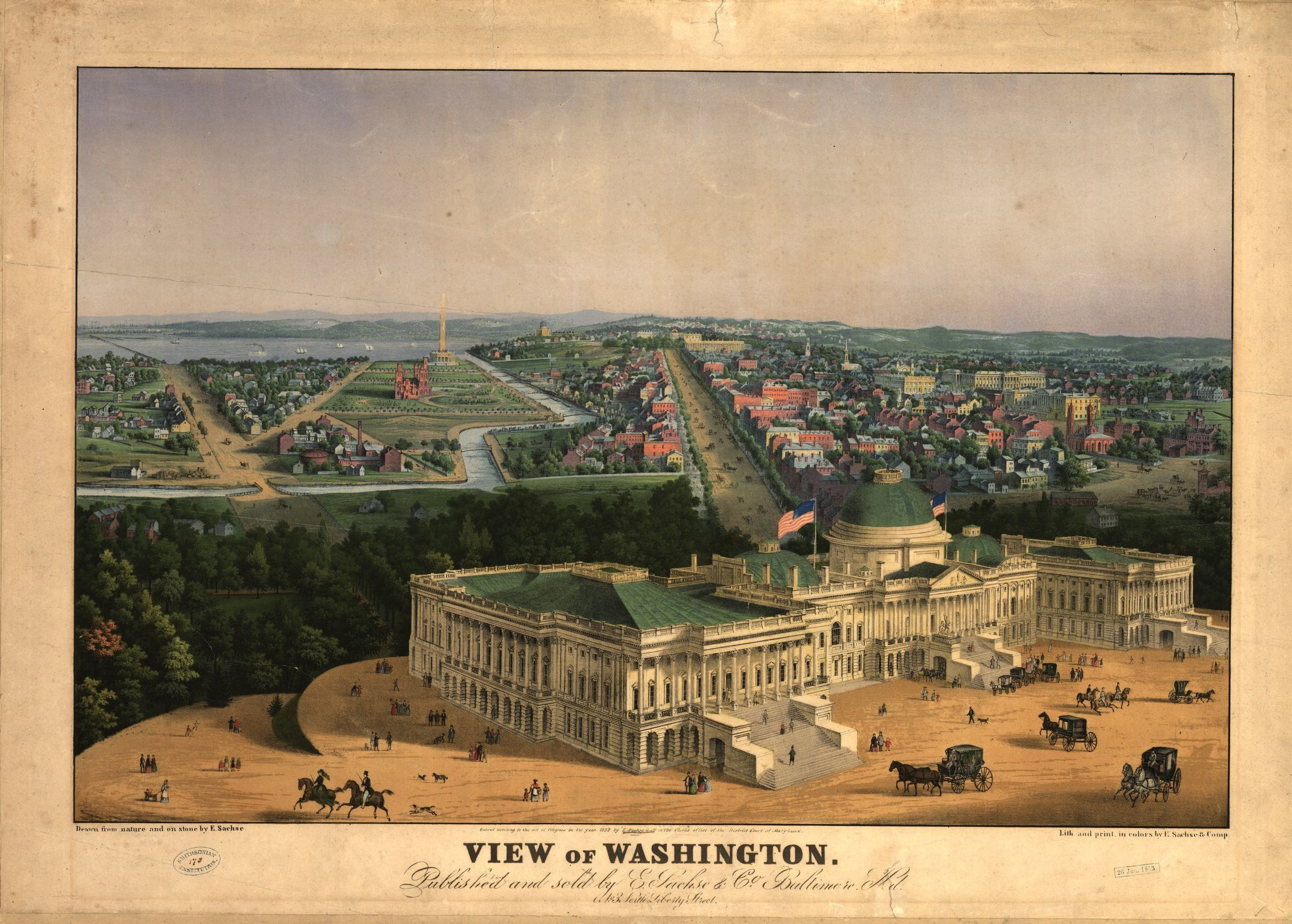
View of Washington in 1852, showing Maryland Avenue between the U.S. Capitol and the Potomac River

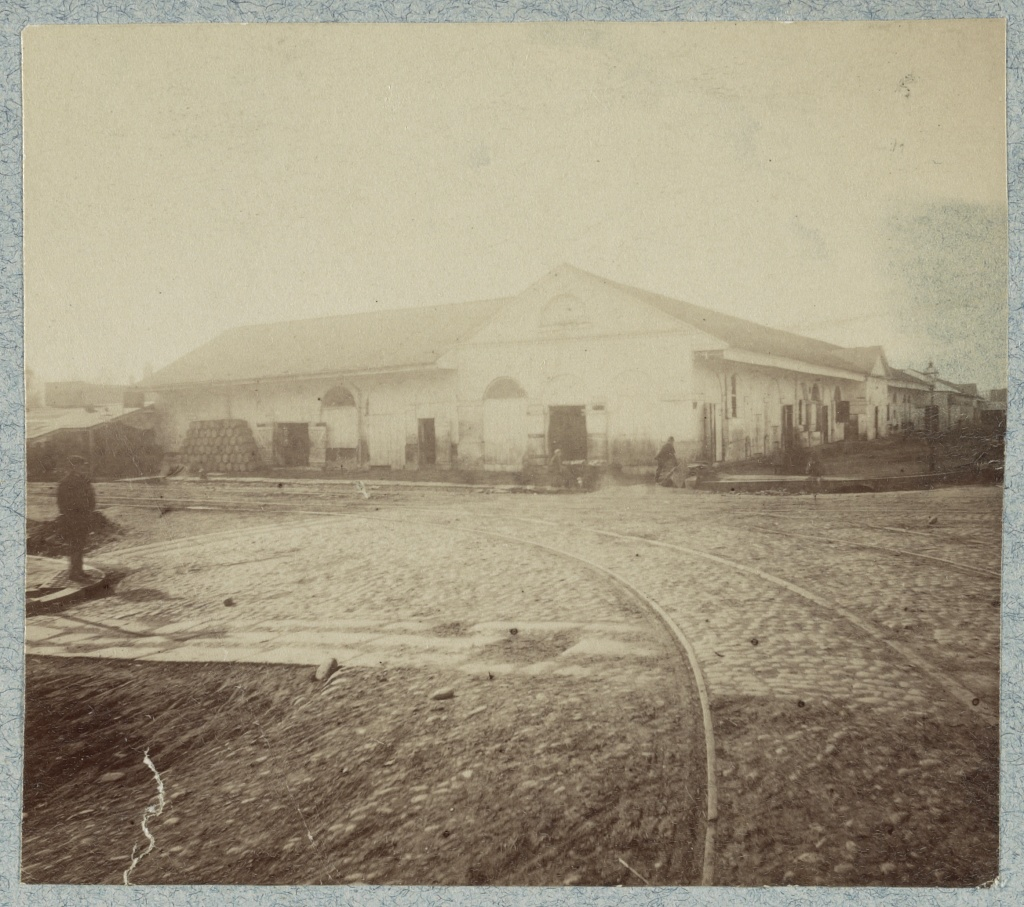
Centre Market, also known as the Seventh Street Market, photographed during the American Civil War

Robey was deemed a "resident of this city" by the Washington Gazette at the time of his wedding to Miss Sarah Talbot in 1823. He was in the slave trade by 1825, as in fall of that year he advertised in the Washington Intelligencer that he sought "to purchase from fifteen to twenty likely young NEGROES of both sexes from fifteen to twenty-five years of age for which the highest price will be given in cash." In 1829 he was located on 9th Street and again offering "CASH! CASH! CASH" for "Negroes of both sexes, between twelve and twenty-five." Robey's ads were known to catch the attention of overseas visitors to the capital. For example, a Bristol, England newspaper reported in October 1830, "Liberty! — The John Bull of Sunday says — 'Who would not be a republican ?— who that could be free would have a King ? — Read the following specimen of liberty in that glorious republic America : one Mr Washington Robey advertises in the Washington Daily National Intelligencer thus — 'Cash ! Cash ! Cash ! The advertiser will give the highest prices for likely young negroes of both sexes from twelve to twenty-five rears of age' In the same Paper there are two other advertisements offering 'Cash for likely young negroes!" Similarly, in 1832 a Welsh newspaper reprinted several slave-trade ads from the Washington Intelligencer, including one by Jilson Dove and one of Robey's, and commented that they would be read with "astonishment and disgust."

Together with Williams brothers' Yellow House, and the slave jail of Franklin & Armfield in Alexandria, District of Columbia, the national capital of the United States was one of the busiest and most prominent slave-trading hubs in the country by the 1830s. These two, along with "McCandless's tavern in Georgetown," were considered "notorious." Robey's jail was in use in December 1830 when the Genius of Universal Emancipation described a procession of "colored human beings handcuffed in pairs, and driven along by what had the appearance of a man on a horse! A similar scene was repeated on Saturday last; a drove consisting of males and females chained in couples, starting from Robey's tavern on foot, for Alexandria, where, with others, they are to embark on board a slave-ship in waiting to convey them to the South." Robey's pen was located at one time on the east side of 7th Street near the intersection with Maryland Avenue. This tavern offered jail facilities to enslavers and other traders, including Joseph W. Neal. This location was apparently conveniently sited between the market house and the steamboat wharf.

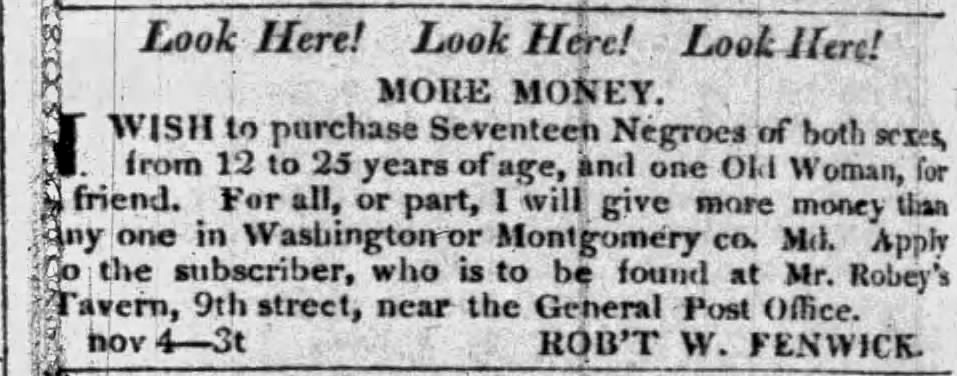
Trader Robert W. Fenwick was working out of Robey's first tavern at the beginning of the 1830s ("Look Here!" Daily National Intelligencer and Washington Express, November 7, 1831)

Robey's jail was visited in 1833 or 1834 by a British traveler named E. S. Abdy, who later described it in his book about the United States:

One day I went to see the 'slaves' pen'— a wretched hovel, right against the Capitol, from which it is distant about half a mile, with no house intervening. The outside alone is accessible to the eye of a visitor; what passes within being reserved for the exclusive observation of its owner, (a man of the name of Robey,) and his unfortunate victims. It is surrounded by a wooden paling fourteen or fifteen feet in height, with the posts outside to prevent escape, and separated from the building by a space too narrow to admit of a free circulation of air. At a small window above, which was unglazed and exposed alike to the heat of summer and the cool of winter...two or three sable faces appeared, looking out wistfully, to while away the time and catch a refreshing breeze; the weather being extremely hot.

Robey's tavern is listed in the 1834 Washington City directory. According to Frederic Bancroft in Slave-Trading in the Old South, "The Washington Directory of 1834 indicates the ownership and location of the tavern as follows: 'Robey [,] Washington, Tavern, e side 7 w, btw B and Cb' [southwest]. As Md. ave. cuts off part of the block north of C st., the Directory to that extent is inexplicit."

In September 1833, a man named Robert Thomas petitioned the Circuit Court of the District of Columbia for a writ of habeas corpus as he claimed he was legally free and "entitled to his freedom & is unlawfully held in confinement" in the jail of Washington Robey. Similarly, in February 1834, Rebecca Hobbs, petitioning the same court, "represents that she is illegally detained in confinement by a certain Thomas Magruder a negro trader and a certain Washington Robey, and that the said Thomas Magruder claims her as his slave for life and intends to carry her beyond the Jurisdiction of your Honors Court and that she is entitled to her freedom and is being oppressively and illegally claimed as a slave by the said Thomas Magruder." Also, in March 1834, "The evidence in this case was considered by the court on the 21st March 1834 & thereupon it was ordered that the girl Evelina therein mentioned be discharged" from Robey's slave jail.

In December 1834 "P. H." wrote a letter to The Liberator abolitionist newspaper criticizing a New York lawyer named Fontaine H. Pettis, stating "I hope you will do all in your power to give Mr. Pettis the notoriety which he seeks, and to send his name to posterity with those of Woolfolk, Washington Robie, and Franklin & Armfield." In 1836 Robey was living on 8th Street and advertised his interest in acquiring "seventy or eighty likely young negroes." The same year, the American Anti-Slavery Society produced a broadside called "The Slave Market of America" about slavery and the slave trade in Washington, D.C. Robey's 7th Street tavern was pictured and mapped as Neal's Slave Jail and described in the caption:

This establishment was owned by W. Robey, who is also engaged in the trade. In May 1834, a gentleman visited it and fell into conversation with the overseer of the pen. He heard the clanking of chains within the pen. "O," said the Overseer—himself a Slave, "I have seen fifty or seventy Slaves taken out of the pen, and the males chained together in pairs, and drove off to the South—and how they would cry, and groan, and take on, and wring their hands but the driver would put on the whip and tell them to shut up so they would go off and bear it as well as they could.'

The standing advertisement of this house is as follows:

"CASH FOR 200 NEGROES."

"We will give cash for two hundred likely young negroes, of both sexes, families included. Persons wishing to dispose of their slaves, will do well to give us a call, as we will give higher prices in cash than any other purchasers who are now, or may hereafter come into this market. All communications will meet attention. We can at all times be found at our residence on 7th street, immediately South of the Centre Market House, Washington, D. C."

"JOSEPH W. NEAL & CO."

Robey died of a lingering illness on New Year's Day 1841 at the age of 41. At the time of his death he ran a tavern on 8th Street between D and E streets; the fixtures and furniture were sold at auction in February 1841.

== See also ==
- List of American slave traders
- History of slavery in Washington, D.C.
- Slave markets and slave jails in the United States
- Bibliography of the slave trade in the United States
