= Jilson Dove =

American slave trader (~1783–1853)

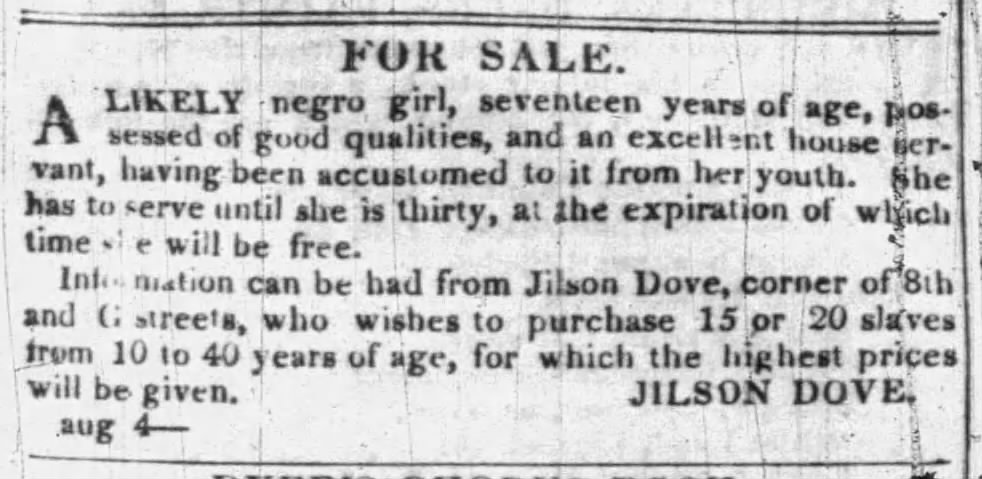
- "For Sale" Daily National Intelligencer and Washington Express, District of Columbia, August 4, 1834
- Born: c. 1785; Virginia, U.S.
- Died: 1853; Washington, D.C.
- Occupations: Police officer, slave trader, restauranteur

Jilson Dove (c. 1785 – June 14, 1853) was a resident of Washington, D.C. in the United States. He worked at a number of occupations including federal police officer guarding Native American delegations visiting the city, municipal constable, fishmonger, restauranteur, real estate agent, and slave trader. In the 1830s he caught the attention of abolitionists, in part due to his work as a local slave patroller. Dove would probably have been considered a slave-trading agent, meaning a second-tier trader who primarily concentrated on local, small-scale buying for resale to the larger interstate slave dealers.

== Life and work ==
Dove was born in the state of Virginia around 1785. Dove was married in Baltimore, Maryland in 1810 to Mary Drugan. Dove served as a sergeant in the District of Columbia militia during the War of 1812. In 1813, when he was about 28 years old, he announced in the newspaper that he was ending his business partnership but would continue in the brickmaking business independently. (Note: Coincidentally, at least two other Chesapeake-region slave traders also worked as brickmakers: Moses Hindes and James F. Purvis of Baltimore.) Dove advertised twice in the Alexandria Gazette in 1816; in February he had for sale some Waterloo-striped calico fabric, and in June he offered newly arrived pickled oysters. In 1819 he was suspended from his Masonic lodge for "unmasonic conduct". The same year, he was to take the oath of an insolvent debtor in an Alexandria, District of Columbia courtroom.

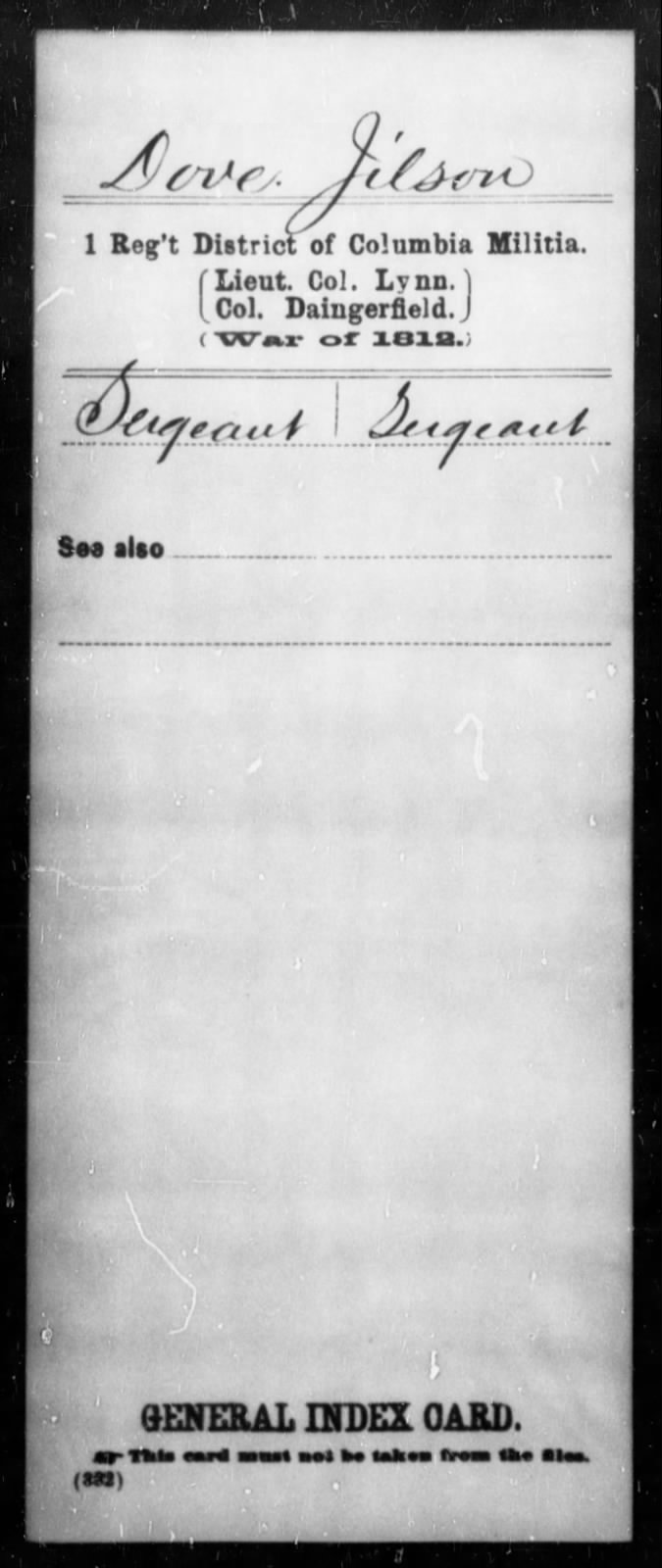
Jilson Dove in Carded Records of Soldiers Who Served in Volunteer Organizations During the War of 1812, compiled 1899–1927

In spring 1820 he was advertising real estate to Alexandria buyers. He was enumerated as a resident of Washington, D.C. at the time of the 1820 census. His obituary later stated that he had moved from Virginia to D.C. in around 1820. By 1821 he was operating a fish market at the Red House Landing below Alexandria. Two years later he was to be confined in prison as a debtor. His fortunes seemed to turn somewhat after that, as he became a host of the Union Hotel, which boasted of its fine green turtle dinner, and canvasback ducks available for either dinner service or for sale to home cooks. By the end of the decade he operated and advertised an "elegant refectory" adjacent to a coffeehouse, and he also sought to buy and sell quality secondhand furniture.

In June 1833, Benjamin Lundy, a highly influential early abolitionist, mentioned Jilson Dove in his newspaper Genius of Universal Emancipation:

Last week, a very decent, orderly-looking, colored woman, was coming over the bridge to our city to get employ, it is said. She was seen by a man, named Jilson Dove, a constable, who buys and catches negroes for the traders. The woman finding she was about to be taken to the pen or enclosure,—where all kidnapped and others are put, before taken to the south,—got loose, and attempted to run away from the constable—but he followed her so close, she had no way to escape but by jumping into the river, where she was drowned. No fuss or stir was made about it,—she was got out of the river, and buried—and there the matter ended.

The abolitionist poet Sara Jane Lippincott later used this report as the basis for the poem "The Leap from the Long Bridge: An Incident at Washington."

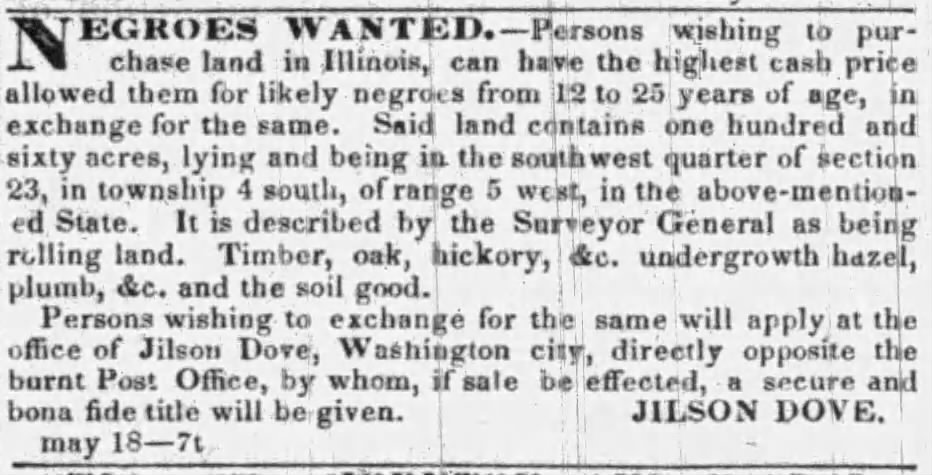
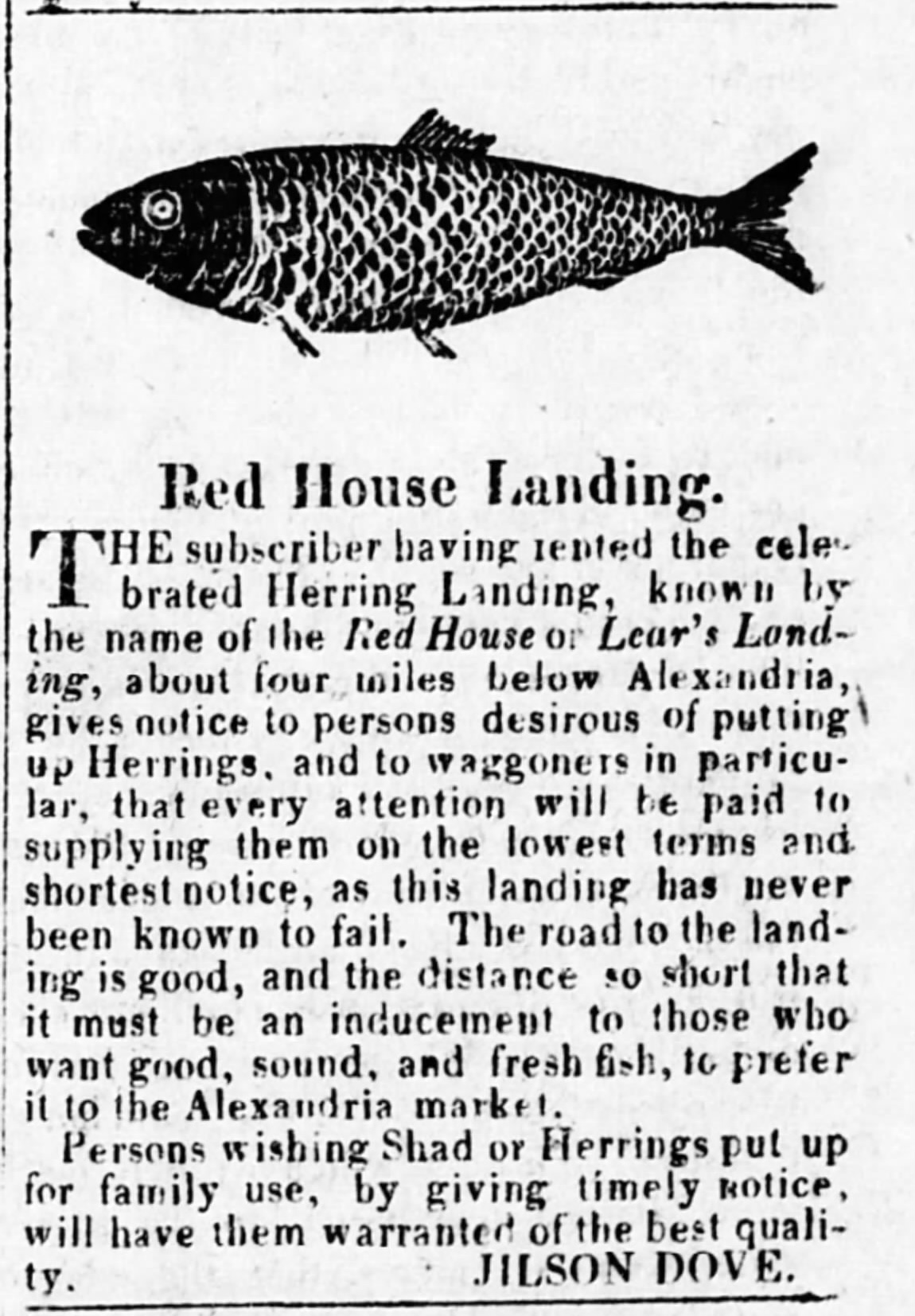
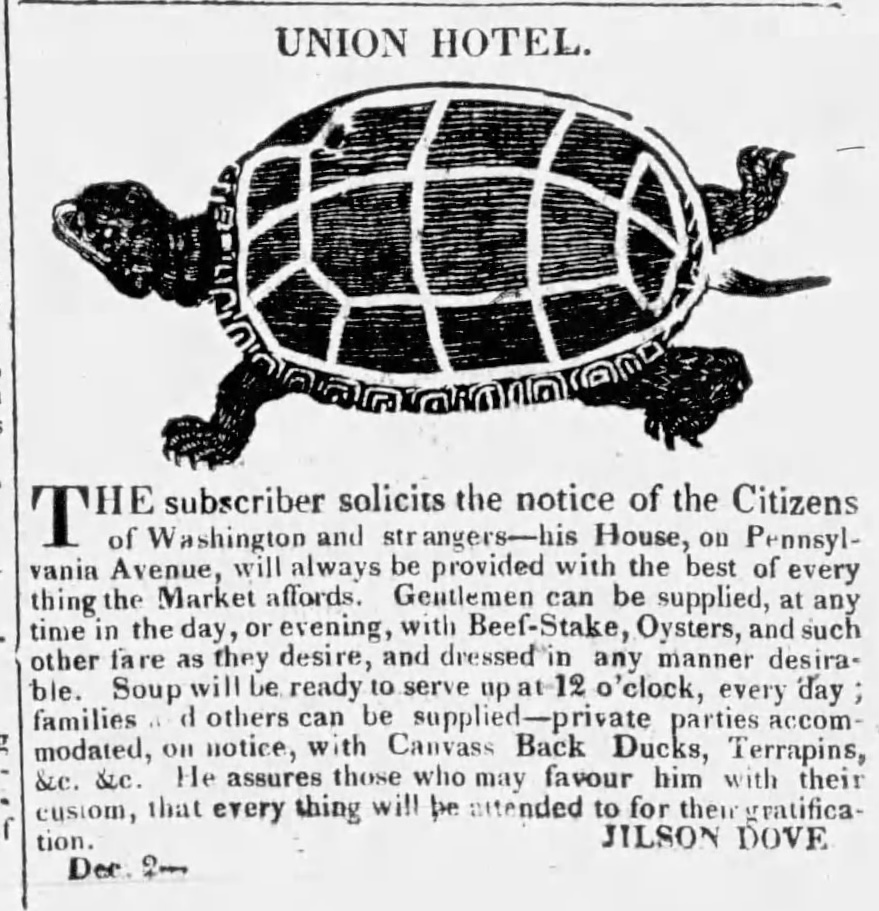
Various Jilson Dove advertisements of the 1820s and 1830s

It was in the 1830s that Dove turned to slave-trading on a continuing basis, although he continued to engage in other work. He was a third-ward constable for the District of Columbia Police Department in 1832, a salaried job that paid $50 a year. In February and March 1833 U.S. Senator Henry Clay paid Dove to drive Clay's cattle from Kentucky to Pennsylvania. In 1832 a Welsh newspaper reprinted several slave-trade ads from the Washington Intelligencer, including one of Washington Robey's, and commented that they would be read with "astonishment and disgust." The first listed was placed by Jilson Dove and stated "Money ! Money ! Money !— I wish to purchase from twenty to thirty likely young Negroes of both sexes from twelve to twenty-five years of age. For all or part I will give more money than anyone in Washington City or Montgomery County, Md. Apply to the subscriber near the corner of the 13th and E streets Nov 24 JILSON DOVE." In 1833, Dove was working out of the Hendley Tavern and was willing to trade houses for "servants," which was one of the polite euphemisms for slaves. In Slave-Trading in the Old South (1931), historian Frederic Bancroft wrote that: "Jilson Dove, probably a real estate agent, wished 'to purchase from forty to fifty Negroes of both sexes, from the age of twelve to twenty-five', and to give in exchange two two-story brick houses in the business part of Washington. Obviously he was agent for some interstate trader when he later 'wanted immediately from 25 to 30 negroes of both sexes'. As this was more than the District was likely to supply, it was an appeal to Maryland and Virginia. The trading in District slaves—which was relatively slight, spasmodic and carried on chiefly by agents—also comprised, of course, sales to settle estates, collect debts and pay for fines and jail fees". The Journal of Negro History observed that "in 1837 Jilson Dove, in an advertisement in the National Intelligencer, offered his services as an agent to secure for the people of the District of Columbia servants for their own use, also to dispose of those servants whom the owners desired to be kept in the District". Historian Steven Deyle commented on this, writing that slave traders "adjusted their practices to cater to their customers' (and society's) paternalistic tastes...Many made direct appeals to owners' paternalistic sensibilities...Some even appeared to specialize in this market. Most of Jilson Dove's notices were for purchases in the interregional trade, but during the summer of 1837 he offered 'his services as an agent to the citizens of Washington to furnish them with servants for their own use. Persons wishing to sell their servants, to remain in this place, will please give me a call, as I can at all times get them a good home'." In 1838 Dove was offering to trade land in Illinois for "negroes". That year he apparently traded out of Lloyd's Steamboat Hotel on Seventh Street "opposite the Center Market House". In 1839 he offered a house and lot in exchange for valuable servants. As the decade turned, Dove began working as a slave trader from a location on Pennsylvania Avenue.

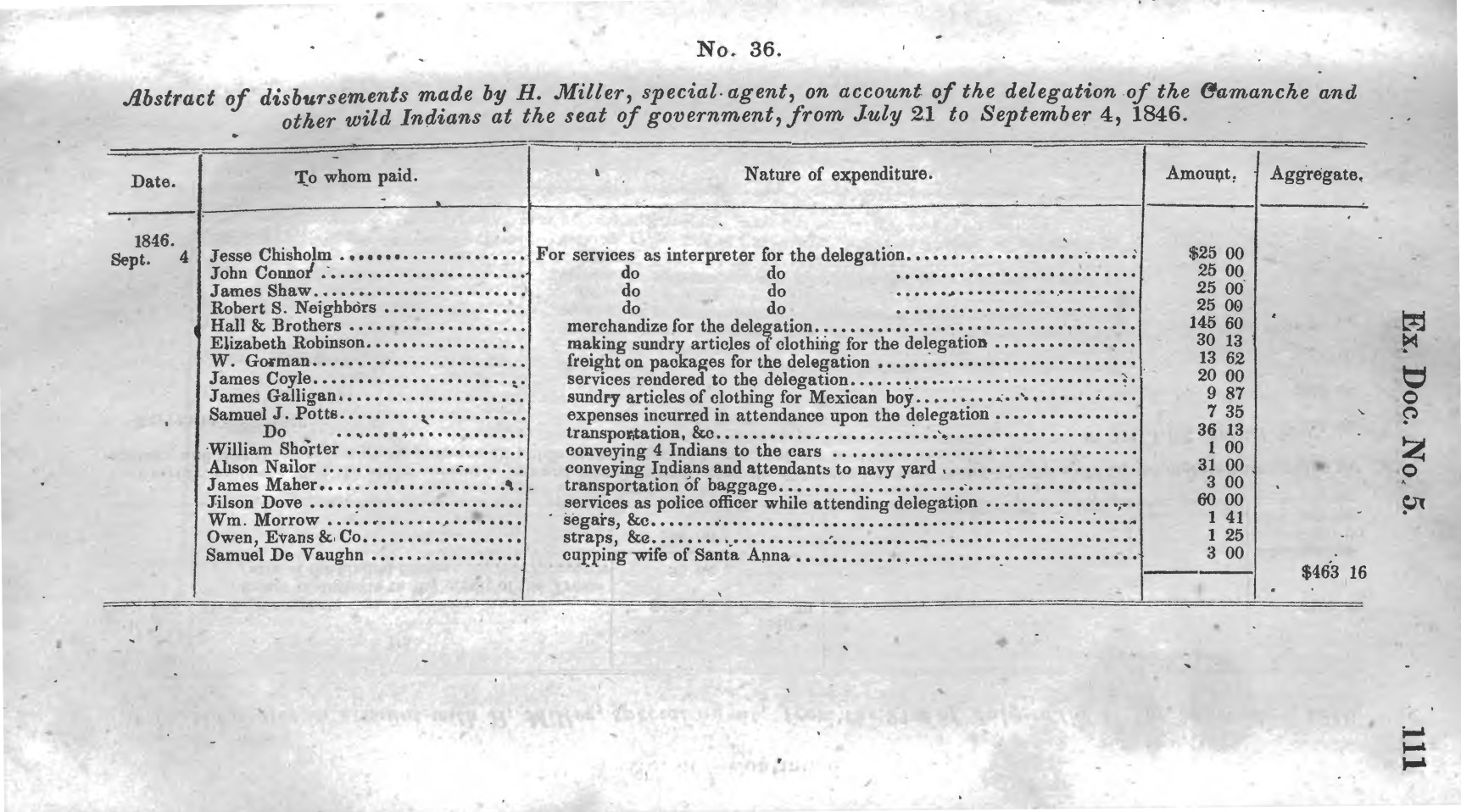
Jilson Dove was paid $60 for "services as police officer while attending a delegation" of "Comanche and other wild Indians at the seat of government" (H.R. Exec. Doc. No. 5, 30th Cong., 1st Sess. 1847 via University of Oklahoma)

Meanwhile, according to a history of Native American treaty delegations in Washington, Dove apparently also was known to intercede in potential scraps between intoxicated indigenous men and local street toughs: "Street gangs turned the intemperance of the Winnebagos into a cruel sport. They would wait outside the hotel for the inebriated Indians to stray their way and then 'beat them severely & [were] even disposed to kill them.' The Winnebagos were frequently saved from catastrophe by Jilson Dove, a street vendor who took a samaritan-like interest in their welfare. Described as 'a very powerful & resolute man,' Dove would rescue the Winnebagos from the hooligans and return them to their quarters. The Indian Office gave Dove eighty dollars in appreciation for this valuable service after the Winnebagos left Washington". Dove was paid $66 in 1852 for "serving as police officer in charge of Indian delegation" for visitors to Washington from the "wild prairie tribes".

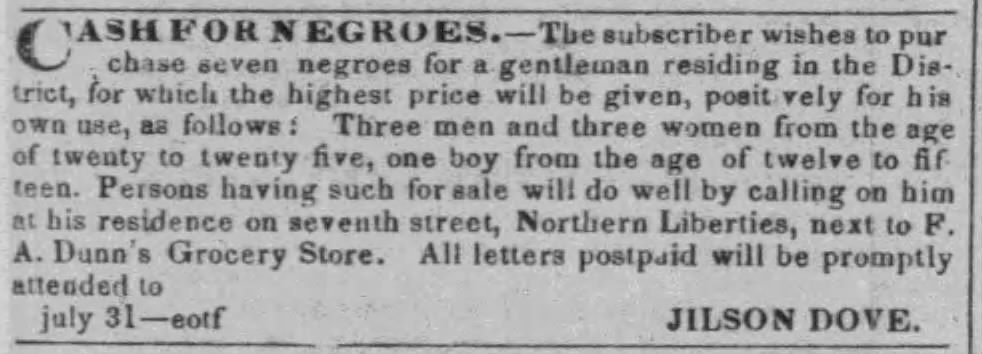
"Cash for Negroes" ad placed by Jilson Dove in the Daily National Intelligencer and Washington Express of August 17, 1842

Dove seemed to slow down a bit in the 1840s. In 1841 and 1844 he was paid to whitewash the Center Market House. He advertised "cash for negroes" once in 1842, and reported that he had found a pocketbook on the road to Bladensburg containing cash and a gold ring. In 1844 he was paid $150 for the work of "taking up incendiaries," that is, investigating a series of arson fires in the area and arresting the culprits.

Dove died in Washington, D.C. in 1853 at age 68. Dove and his wife are both buried at Trinity United Methodist Church Cemetery in Alexandria, Virginia under an obelisk-shaped grave marker.

== See also ==
- List of American slave traders
- History of slavery in Washington, D.C.
- Slave markets and slave jails in the United States
- Bibliography of the slave trade in the United States
- Snow Riot – 1835 race riot in Washington, D.C.
