= Emancipation Commission =

The District of Columbia Compensated Emancipation Act of 1862 established an Emancipation Commission of three members to review petitions for compensation by slaveowners in the District of Columbia. On April 16, 1862, the same day that President Abraham Lincoln signed the Compensated Emancipation Act, he appointed Daniel R. Goodloe, Samuel Finley Vinton, and James G. Berret to the Commission. Berret, a former Mayor of the District of Columbia, declined the nomination due to disagreement with the law. President Lincoln appointed Horatio King in his place. Vinton and Goodloe were confirmed by the Senate on April 21, 1862. Following the death of Samuel Vinton, President Lincoln appointed John M. Brodhead to replace him.

The Commission met daily, Monday through Friday, in the old City Hall building.

From late April through early June, 1862, the Commission accepted petitions for compensation. Each petition included the name, age, sex, and "particular description" of each enslaved person for whom the petitioner was claiming compensation. In all, 966 petitions were filed pursuant to the Compensated Emancipation Act and its supplement.
