= Slavery in the District of Columbia =

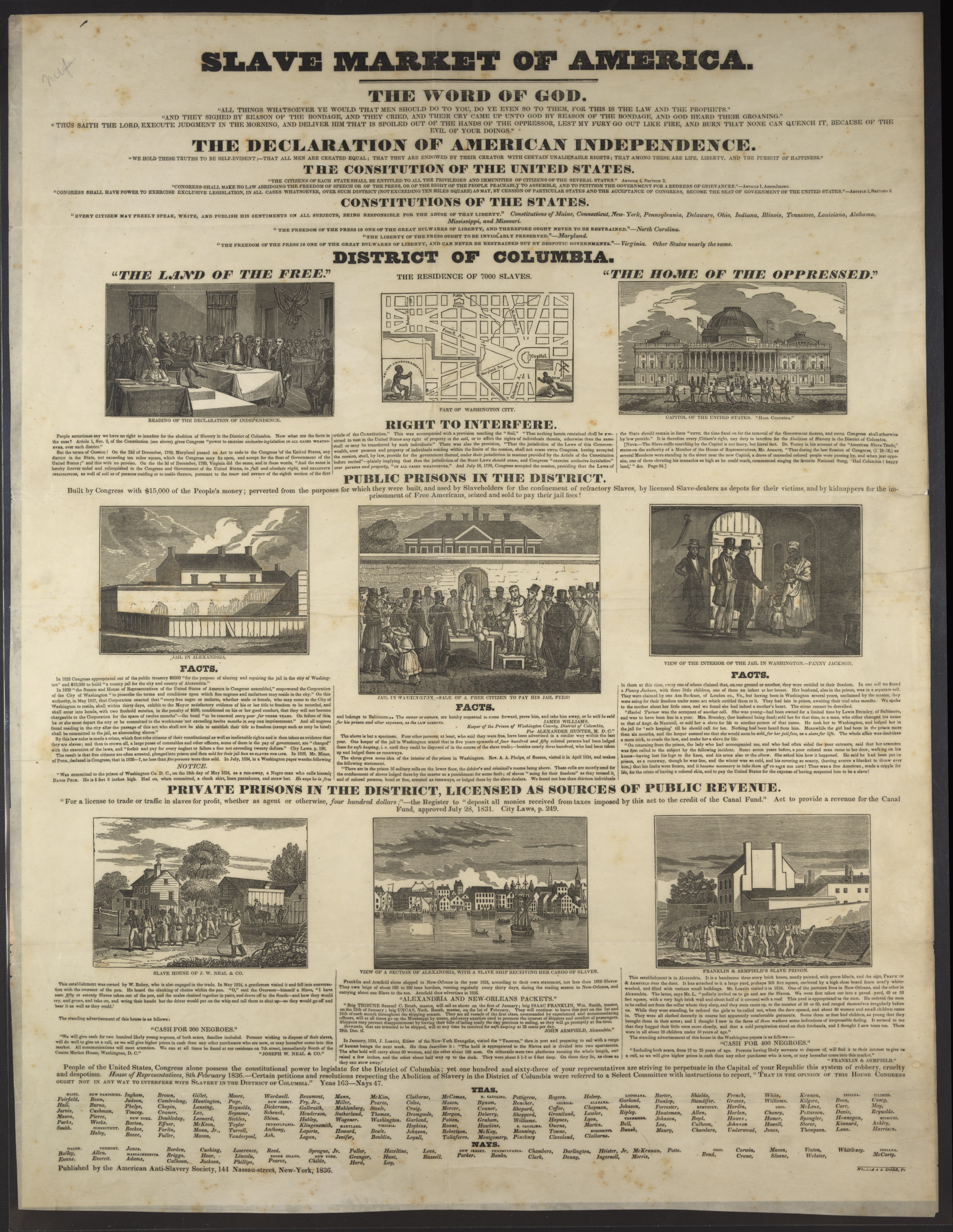
The District of Columbia, slave market of America. Includes Alexandria slave dealers. American Anti-Slavery Society, 1836.

In the District of Columbia, the slave trade was legal from its creation until it was outlawed as part of the Compromise of 1850. That restrictions on slavery in the District were probably coming was a major factor in the retrocession of the Virginia part of the District back to Virginia in 1847. Thus the large slave-trading businesses in Alexandria, such as Franklin & Armfield, could continue their operations in Virginia, where slavery was more secure.

Ownership of enslaved people remained legal in the District. It was not until the departure of the legislators from the seceding states that Congress could pass in 1862 the District of Columbia Compensated Emancipation Act. The act provided partial compensation, up to $300 per slave, to slave owners. It was paid from general federal funds. Even though the compensation was small, as before the war a productive slave was worth much more than $300, it is the only place in the United States where slave owners received any compensation at all for freeing their slaves. Some slave owners, rather than manumitting (freeing) their enslaved workers for this small compensation, took them to Virginia and more profitably sold them there, which was legal.

Abolitionists, led by Massachusetts Representative and former President John Quincy Adams, focused on eliminating slavery in the District. They argued that the Constitution gave Congress full control over the laws of the District, including laws regarding slavery. States' rights was not a factor because the District was not a state. As Southern legislators realized, it was the first step toward outlawing slavery everywhere. The Emancipation Proclamation came five months after slavery ended in the District.

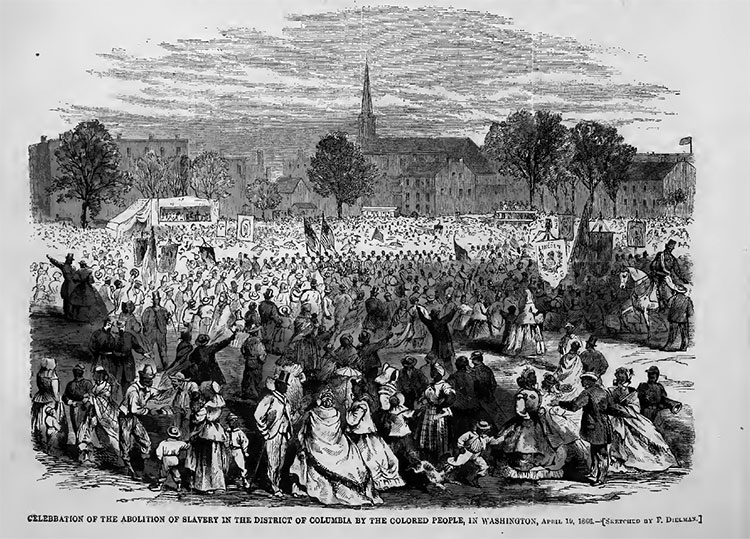
Celebration by "the colored people in Washington" of the fourth anniversary of the abolition of slavery in the District of Columbia, April 19, 1866

The drive to eliminate slavery in the District of Columbia was a major component in the anti-slavery campaign that led to the Civil War. Congress, under the leadership of former president John Quincy Adams, now Representative from strongly anti-slavery Massachusetts, was flooded with many petitions for action on the subject. They passed the gag rules, automatically tabling the petitions and preventing them from being read, discussed, or printed. Rather than resolving anything, these rules outraged Northerners and contributed to the growing polarization of the country over slavery.

== Census ==
According to the census, the number of enslaved people in the District grew from 1800 to 1820, and then began a decline in raw numbers and an even faster decline in percentage. In the U.S. Census of 1820, the population of the District (33,039) was 67% white (22,614), 12% "free colored" (4,038), and 19% enslaved (6,377). In that of 1850, Alexandria no longer being in the District, 73% were white (37,941), 19% "free colored" (10,059), and 7% enslaved (3,687). In that of 1860 the percentages are 81% white (75,080), 15% "free colored" (11,131), and 4% enslaved (3,185).

== Beginnings ==
When the District of Columbia was created in 1801, slavery was legal in the two states from whose territory the District was created, Maryland and Virginia. Slavery remained legal in the District, as no steps were taken to ban it. Enslaved workers helped to build the White House, the U.S. Capitol, and other Washington buildings, in addition to clearing land and grading streets. Except under Presidents John Adams and his son John Quincy Adams, slaves served in the White House.

== The campaign to ban slavery in the District ==
It was part of the American political wisdom of the Antebellum period, believed in by Abraham Lincoln along with many others, that, according to the Tenth Amendment to the Constitution, slavery in the United States was a state matter. Each state could determine whether slavery was permitted, and make such laws to govern the enslaved and the slave trade as it saw fit. According to the Constitution, Article 1, Section 9, they could "import...such Persons as any of the States now existing shall think proper to admit", but only until 1808, in the only restriction on slavery the framers of the Constitution could agree on. While the federal government could have regulated the extensive interstate commerce in enslaved people that emerged after 1808, there was not support for this in Congress, controlled by Southerners until 1861. Abolitionists wanted to abolish slavery altogether, not just the interstate trade.

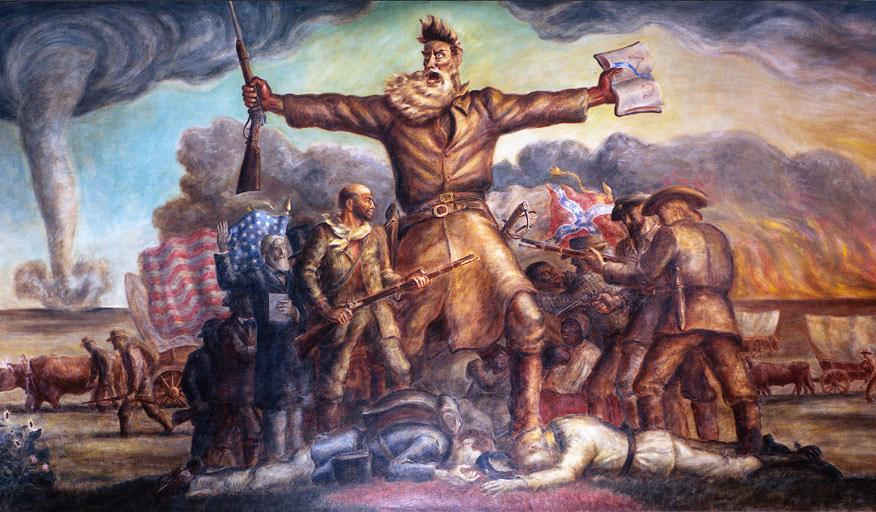
Main section of Tragic Prelude, a mural by John Steuart Curry in the Kansas State Capitol

Discussion focused on two questions. The first was whether new states made out of the western territories of the Louisiana Purchase and the formerly Mexican Southwest would be free or slave. This question was never resolved until 1861. It produced the guerrilla warfare of the Bleeding Kansas period, when Kansas had simultaneously two governments, in two cities, with two proposed constitutions, one slave and the other free, each claiming to be the only legitimate government of the entire Territory. This was the dress rehearsal, the Tragic Prelude, led by "old" John Brown, to the Civil War. Although the Free Soil partisans opposing slavery in Kansas succeeded, after much bloodshed and commotion and a federal investigation, in making it clear that the vast majority of Kansans wanted the state to be free, the Southern bloc that controlled Congress did not allow this. Kansas entered the Union as a free state within days after enough seceding Southern legislators withdrew for it to pass.

The other question, less known today (2020), was how to get rid of slavery in the places where it still existed. Aside from the remote Utah Territory, the only place in the country where slavery existed, but was not a state, was the District of Columbia. The federal government had full control over the District of Columbia. States' rights had nothing to do with it. Thus abolitionists focused on it. Slavery was most vulnerable there.

== First attempts ==
"In 1805 Mr. Sloan of New Jersey offered [in the House of Representatives] a resolution moving the emancipation of slaves in the District at a certain age. The motion to refer it to a committee was voted down by sixty-five to forty-seven. Without any discussion, the resolution was voted on and lost by seventy-seven to thirty-one."

In 1828, citizens of the District petitioned unsuccessfully for gradual emancipation.

== On the front page of the first issue of The Liberator ==
William Lloyd Garrison began, on January 1, 1831, what would be the principal organ and community bulletin board of the American abolitionist movement, The Liberator. The first article on the front page was his complaint that the

District is rotten with the plague, and stinks in the nostrils of the world. Though it is the Seat of our National Government, open to the daily inspection of foreign ambassadors, and ostensibly opulent with the congregated wisdom, virtue, and intelligence of the land, yet a fouler spot scarcely exists on earth. In it the worst features of slavery are exhibited; and as a mart for slave-traders, it is unequalled.

He followed with the text of a petition to Congress, and gave readers the address of the Boston bookstore where a copy could be signed.

The second article in the new newspaper examined "The Slave Trade in the Capital".

== Snow riot (1835) and Reuben Crandall trial (1836) ==
Dr. Reuben Crandall, after a jury trial, was acquitted of the charge of distributing abolitionist literature in the District, which was a crime under federal law. The trial was the biggest criminal trial in the District up to that date, attended by multiple reporters and congressmen. The testimony was quickly published, and reveals much about slave life in the District at that moment. From it we learn, for example, that police doubled as slave catchers; regardless of any support slave owners were legally entitled to receive, as a practical matter they hired slave-catchers to apprehend fugitives, offering rewards for their return.

Francis Scott Key, author of The Star-Spangled Banner, was a slave owner and a defender of slavery. In his position as U.S. Attorney for the District of Columbia, he was in charge of criminal prosecutions in the District, all of which prosecutions were for violations of federal law, as no state law was relevant. Shortly after Crandall's opening an office in Georgetown, slave catchers reported him for possession of abolitionist literature, and Key wrote a lengthy indictment, charging him with "seditious libel and inciting slaves and free blacks to revolt".

Key thought he would gain politically by "finally doing something about the abolitionists". Reuben's sister, Prudence Crandall, had set up the first school for Black girls in the country, the Canterbury Female Boarding School, which aroused such violent opposition from white townspeople that she was forced to close it out of concern for the students' safety. However, the defense produced evidence that Reuben had quite different opinions from his sister, and had been confused with an abolitionist of similar name. A jury found him "not guilty" on all counts. Key was publicly humiliated, and it hurt his career.

Bail had been set so high for Reuben that he could not meet it, and he remained in the dank Washington jail for over six months. He contracted tuberculosis there, and died not long after his release.

== Slave pens ==
There were several slave pens in the District, including the Duke Street pen built by Franklin & Armfield in what became Alexandria, Virginia (following the retrocession); Washington Robey's jail, which was often used by Joseph Neal; and the Yellow House of the Williams brothers.

One day I went to see the "slaves' pen"—a wretched hovel, "right against" the Capitol, from which it is distant about half a mile, with no house intervening. The outside alone is accessible to the eye of a visitor; what passes within being reserved for the exclusive observation of its owner (a man of the name of Robey) and his unfortunate victims. It is surrounded by a wooden paling fourteen or fifteen feet [3 to 4 meters] in height, with the posts outside to prevent escape and separated from the building by a space too narrow to admit of a free circulation of air. At a small window above, which was unglazed and exposed alike to the heat of summer and the cold of winter, so trying to the constitution, two or three sable faces appeared, looking out wistfully to while away the time and catch a refreshing breeze; the weather being extremely hot. In this wretched hovel, all colors, except white--the only guilty one—both sexes, and all ages, are confined, exposed indiscriminately to all the contamination which may be expected in such society and under such seclusion. The inmates of the gaol, of this class I mean, are even worse treated; some of them, if my informants are to be believed, having been actually frozen to death, during the inclement winters which often prevail in the country.

Congressman John Wentworth wrote in his 1882 memoirs:

Washington was, at that time [1843], the greatest slave-mart in the United States. Within sight of the Capitol, not far from the lower gate, and near, if not upon, the land where the public garden now is, was a building with a large yard around it, enclosed with a high fence. Thither slaves were brought from all the slave-holding regions, like cattle to the Chicago stock-yards, and locked up until sold. There were regular auction days for those not disposed of at private sale. The Chicago Fire destroyed a hard cracker which I had preserved as a specimen by which purchasers tested the age of slaves. And to this day, if there is anything that the average Southern negro does not know, it is his own age. The slaves were placed upon a block, and, when a question arose as to age, the auctioneer requested them to bite from a cracker, which all slave auctioneers kept for such occasions. The theory was that while a slave could masticate well he could work. Nearly all the labor of Washington was performed by slaves, many of whom were hired from the neighboring States. The slaves were expected to collect their wages monthly and take them home on some Saturday night.

== Gag rule (1836–1844) ==
Overwhelmed with the number of petitions arriving, the House of Representatives set up a Select Committee to consider what to do, headed by Rep. Henry L. Pinckney of South Carolina. The Committee endorsed the House's existing position that Congress had no authority to interfere in any way with slavery in the District of Columbia, or in any state. So that "the agitation of this subject should be finally arrested", it recommended that "all petitions, memorials, resolutions, propositions, or papers, relating in any way, or to any extent whatever, to the subject of slavery, or the abolition of slavery, shall, without being either printed or referred, be laid upon the table, and that no further action whatever shall be had thereon". It passed by a vote of 117 to 68. This and subsequent, related gag orders were repealed in 1844.

== Massachusetts and Vermont call for Congress to act ==
In March 1840, both houses of the Legislature of Massachusetts passed a group of "Resolves" (Resolutions) calling for Congress to use its Constitutional authority and immediately end slavery and the slave trade in the District, and prohibit interstate commerce in enslaved persons. This was then the official position of the Commonwealth of Massachusetts. The Commonwealth also went on record as opposing the admission of any new slave states.

Garrison, who reproduced the now-rare pamphlet on the front page of his newspaper The Liberator, described this as a victory, the first time any government anywhere in the United States had taken an official position calling for the immediate abolition of slavery. Vermont promptly followed Massachusetts' example.

== Prohibition of the slave trade (1850) ==
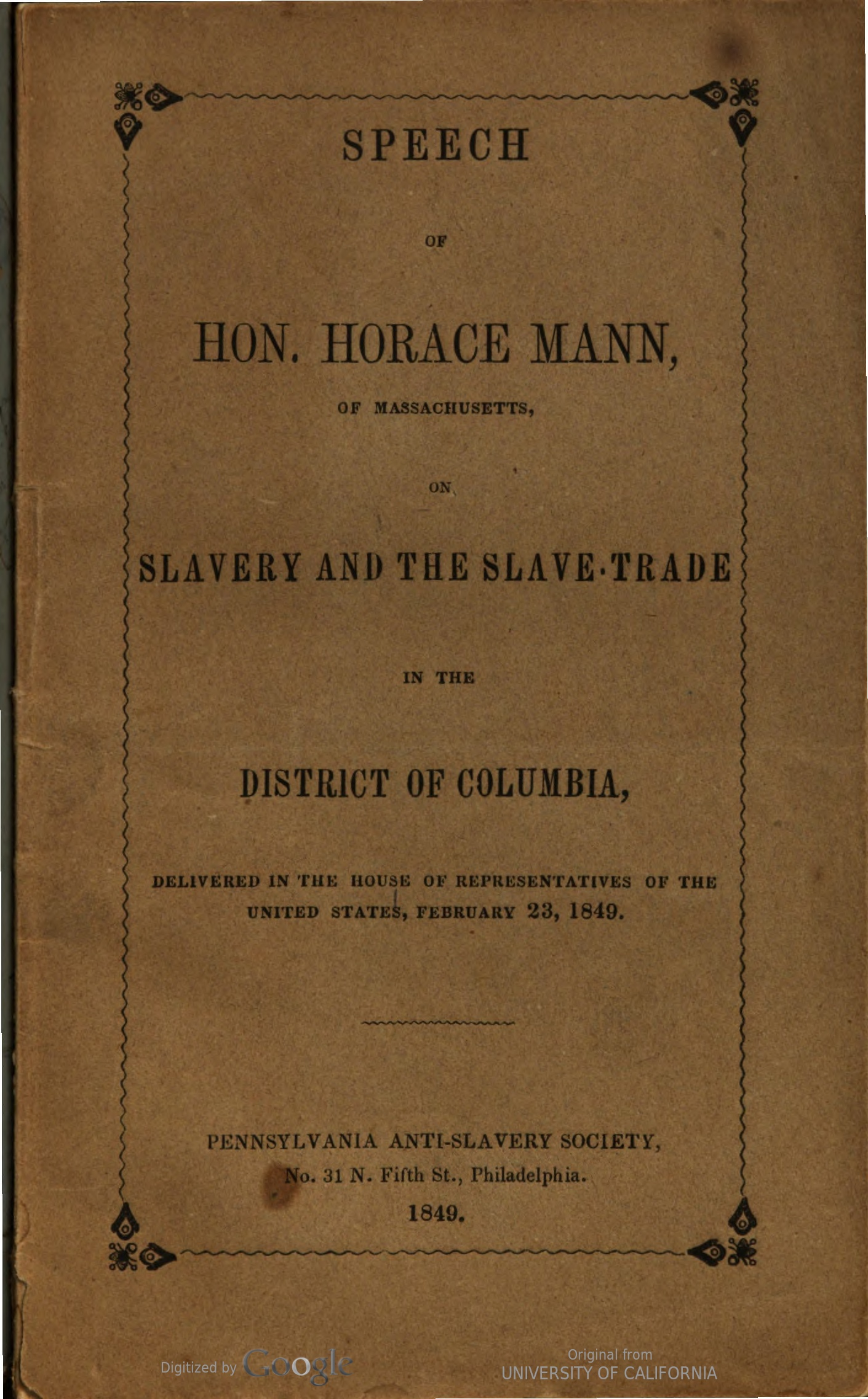
Cover of Speech of Hon. Horace Mann, of Massachusetts, on slavery and the slave-trade in the District of Columbia, delivered in the House of Representatives of the United States, February 23, 1849, printed by Pennsylvania Anti-Slavery Society

As part of the Compromise of 1850, slave trading was prohibited in Washington DC, but slave ownership was not. The residents of the capitol could still own slaves and trade for them in the nearby states of Virginia.

== District of Columbia Compensated Emancipation Act (1862) ==
Slave owners complained that emancipation of their enslaved workers would deprive them of their property; "property rights" are a euphemism for slavery in speeches of the period. Compensated emancipation, in which owners were to be compensated by a government for the loss of their "property", had been discussed at length in the 1840s and 1850s and part of England's liberation of its Caribbean slaves. This changed from an idea to a real possibility after Southern senators and representatives abandoned the U.S. Congress in 1861, and Lincoln became president. With Congress's support, he proposed it to the Union slave states, also called border states, of Missouri, Kentucky, Maryland, and Delaware. These states did not agree to any emancipation proposal, compensated or not. Maryland freed its enslaved in 1864, and Missouri early in 1865, but those in Delaware and Kentucky were not liberated until the national ratification of the 13th Amendment in December 1865, seven months after the end of the Civil War. Delaware symbolically ratified the 13th Amendment in 1901, and Kentucky in 1975.

The only place compensated emancipation was put into practice in the United States was in the District of Columbia. Under the District of Columbia Compensated Emancipation Act, passed by Congress and signed by Lincoln in 1862, slavery was prohibited in the District, the federal government compensated owners up to $300 (equivalent to $9,675 in 2025) per freed person, and detailed records exist for each claim and payment. This maximum amount was much less than an able male slave could have been sold for before the war, if taken to Maryland or Virginia and sold there, as many were. However, the value of an enslaved person declined after the beginning of the Civil War, when transport of enslaved people from northern slave "producers" (Maryland and Virginia) to Southern plantation owners became impossible. The looming possibility of uncompensated abolition also depressed the value of slaves.

The day Lincoln signed the bill, April 16, 1862, is celebrated in the District as Emancipation Day, a legal holiday since 2005.

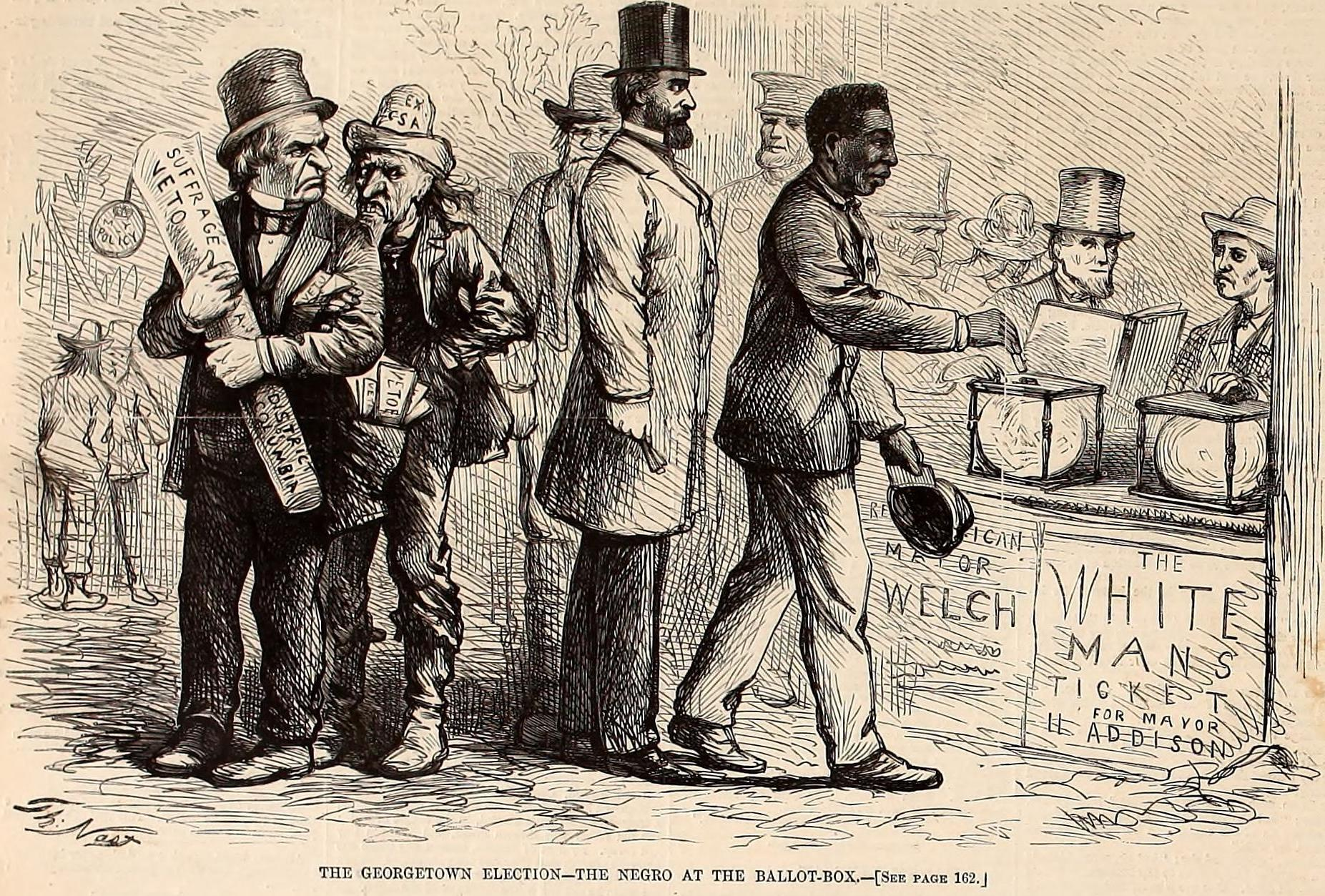
Congress granted suffrage to adult black males in the District of Columbia over Andrew Johnson's veto in January 1867 (Thomas Nast, Harper's Weekly, March 16, 1867)

== See also ==
- Abolitionism in the United States
- Charlotte Dupuy
- District of Columbia Compensated Emancipation Act (1862), which ended slavery in Washington, D.C.
- Emancipation Day § District of Columbia
- John Quincy Adams and abolitionism
- List of slave owners
- Slavery in the United States
- Treatment of slaves in the United States
- Jilson Dove
- List of District of Columbia slave traders
