= Compensated emancipation =

Form of abolishing slavery in which former slaveowners were paid

Compensated emancipation was a method of ending slavery, under which the enslaved person's owner received compensation from the government in exchange for manumitting the slave. This could be monetary, and it could allow the owner to retain the slave for a period of labor as an indentured servant. In practice, cash compensation rarely was equal to the slave's market value. The enslaved themselves received no compensation.

A number of countries (see "Other nations and empires" section below) enacted forms of compensated emancipation. In the United States, however, no nationwide compensation system was ever put in place. Only the District of Columbia, which was under federal control, used compensated emancipation as part of ending slavery in 1862.

== Opposition ==
Owners complained that their compensation was small compared with their loss; they were paid less, often much less, than the market value the slaveowner could have sold the enslaved person for. Governments and non-slaveholding citizens complained about the financial burden of compensating the owners, while for the formerly enslaved it seemed ludicrous that those who had all along benefited from slavery should now receive additional compensation, while its victims received no compensation whatsoever.

Historian Eric Foner wrote, "Even Haiti, where slavery died amid a violent revolution, agreed in 1824 to pay a large indemnity to former slaveholders in exchange for French recognition of its independence.... No one proposed to compensate slaves for their years of unrequited toil." Compensation of slaveholders has been viewed as akin to compensating a thief for returning stolen property, or paying ransom to a kidnapper for releasing his victim, and therefore not so much compensation as a reward for committing what should be a crime.

== Transition away from slavery ==
Compensated emancipation was typically enacted as part of an act that outlawed slavery outright or established a scheme whereby slavery would eventually be phased out. It frequently was accompanied or preceded by laws which approached gradual emancipation by granting freedom to those born to slaves after a given date. Among the European powers, slavery was primarily an issue with their overseas colonies. The British Empire enacted a policy of compensated emancipation (about 40%) for its colonies in 1833, followed by France in 1848, Denmark in 1849, and the Netherlands in 1863. Most South American and Caribbean nations emancipated slavery through compensated schemes in the 1850s and 1860s, while Brazil passed a plan for gradual, compensated emancipation in 1871, and Cuba followed in 1880 after having enacted freedom at birth a decade earlier.

=== Emancipation via indentured servitude ===
Indentured servitude was seen as a compromise between slavery and outright emancipation, an intermediate step. However, no one was happy with compensated emancipation. To be sure, indentured servitude represented for the formerly enslaved an improvement over slavery itself; those indentured could not be forcibly relocated, children and other family members could not be taken away by force, and they could no longer be whipped or raped. However, they were still not free.

=== Qatar ===
Slavery in Qatar was finally abolished by the ruler of Qatar after British pressure in March 1952. The Qatari government reimbursed formers slave owners financially and Sheikh Ali bin Abdullah Al Thani personally contributed with 25 percent of the compensation money. By May 1952, manumission money had been paid for 660 slaves, the average compensation sum being 1,500 rupees, but for some, such as one slave girl, as much as 2,000 rupees; the compensation has been referred to as the first big distribution of wealth in Qatar. The former slaves in Qatar became citizens after manumission. Many members of the Afro-Arabian minority are descendants of the former slaves.

=== Saudi Arabia ===
Slavery in Saudi Arabia was abolished when King Faisal issued a decree for its total abolition in 1962. The political analyst Bruce Riedel argued that the US began to raise the issue of slavery after the meeting between King Abdulaziz and US president Franklin D. Roosevelt in 1945, and that John F. Kennedy finally persuaded the House of Saud to abolish slavery in 1962. BBC presenter Peter Hobday stated that about 1,682 slaves were freed at that time, at a cost to the government of $2,000 each.

=== United States ===
Only in the District of Columbia, which fell under direct Federal auspices, was compensated emancipation enacted. On April 16, 1862, President Lincoln signed the District of Columbia Compensated Emancipation Act. This law prohibited slavery in the District, forcing its 900-odd slaveholders to free their slaves, with the federal government paying owners an average of about $300 (equivalent to $10,000 in 2025) for each.

The 13th Amendment abolished slavery and involuntary servitude in the United States, except as a punishment for crime, but provided no compensation either to owners or to the formerly enslaved. Section 4 of the 14th Amendment prohibited the federal and state governments from assuming debt to compensate former slave owners.

=== Other nations and empires ===
Nations and empires that implemented compensated emancipation:

- Argentina
- Bolivia
- Brazil
- British Empire
- Colombia
- Cuba
- Danish colonies
- Dutch empire
- Ecuador
- Kingdom of France, 1315, see Louis X
- French colonial empire
- Haiti
- Mexico and Central America
- Paraguay
- Peru
- Puerto Rico
- Qatar
- Spanish Empire
- Sweden
- Uruguay
- Venezuela
- Wallachia and Moldavia
- United Kingdom
- United States (District of Columbia only)

== See also ==
- Abolitionism
- Abolitionism in France
- Abolitionism in the United Kingdom
- Abolitionism in the United States
- Gradual emancipation (United States)
- Right to property
- Reparations for slavery (proposed payments to former slaves and their descendants)
