= District of Columbia Compensated Emancipation Act =

1862 U.S. federal law ending slavery in DC

- Long title: An Act for the Release of certain Persons held to Service or Labor in the District of Columbia
- Enacted by: the 37th United States Congress
- Effective: April 16, 1862; 164 years ago

Citations
- Public law: 37–50
- Statutes at Large: 12 Stat. 376

Legislative history
- Introduced in the Senate as S. 108 by Henry Wilson (R‑MA) on December 16, 1861; Committee consideration by the Senate Committee on the District of Columbia; Passed the Senate on April 3, 1862 (29–14); Passed the House on April 11, 1862 (92–39); Signed into law by President Abraham Lincoln on April 16, 1862

Major amendments
- An Act Supplementary to the Act for the release of certain persons held to service or labor in the District of Columbia, Pub. L. 37–127, 12 Stat. 538

An Act for the Release of certain Persons held to Service or Labor in the District of Columbia, 37th Cong., Sess. 2, ch. 54, 12 Stat. 376, known colloquially as the District of Columbia Compensated Emancipation Act or simply Compensated Emancipation Act, was a law that ended slavery in the District of Columbia, while providing enslavers who remained loyal to the United States in the then-ongoing Civil War the ability to petition for compensation. Although not written by him, the act was signed by U.S. President Abraham Lincoln on April 16, 1862. April 16 is now celebrated in the city as Emancipation Day.

== History ==
Proposals to eliminate slavery in the District of Columbia date back at least to the gag rules of the late 1830s. In 1849, as a representative, Lincoln introduced a plan to eliminate slavery in Washington, D.C., through compensated emancipation. The bill failed. The Compromise of 1850 outlawed the sale and purchase of enslaved people in the District of Columbia. However, the ownership of enslaved people in the capital was not affected, and District of Columbia residents could still buy and sell enslaved people in neighboring Virginia and Maryland.

Emancipation in the District of Columbia became possible in 1861 after the departure of the senators and representatives from the seceding states, who had blocked the ending of slavery in the District, not wanting emancipation to be law anywhere. In December 1861, a bill was introduced in Congress to abolish slavery in Washington, D.C. Written by US Army Colonel Thomas Marshall Key, a former Democratic state senator from Ohio who was serving as George McClellan's top legal advisor (Judge Advocate), and sponsored by Senator Henry Wilson of Massachusetts, the bill passed the Senate on April 3 by a vote of 29 in favor and 14 opposed. It passed the House of Representatives on April 11. Lincoln had wanted the bill to include a provision to make emancipation effective only after a favorable vote from the citizens of the District of Columbia. He also wanted the bill to delay implementation until a certain amount of time after enactment. Congress included neither provision in the bill. Lincoln signed the bill on April 16, 1862, amid ongoing Congressional debate over an emancipation plan for the border states. Following the bill's passage, Lincoln proposed several changes to the act, which Congress approved. The commissioners appointed to implement the bill later made a report to Congress listing the names of slaveholders who applied for compensation, the names of people emancipated, and the amounts paid. According to one account, enslavers sold nearly 2000 people from the District in the spring of 1862 in hopes of evading emancipation and getting higher prices from Confederates than the government was offering.

The passage of the Compensated Emancipation Act came nearly nine months before the signing of the Emancipation Proclamation. The act immediately emancipated enslaved people in Washington, D.C., and set aside $1 million to compensate slaveholders loyal to the U.S. government. The law allocated an additional $100,000 to pay each formerly enslaved person $100 (equivalent to $3,225 in 2025) if they chose to leave the United States for places such as Haiti or Liberia, which accepted Black American immigration.

== Outcome ==
The emancipation plan relied on a three-person Emancipation Commission to distribute the allotted funding. To receive compensation, former enslavers were required to provide written evidence of their ownership and state their loyalty to the Union. Most of the petitioners were white, but some blacks filed for compensation, having once bought their family members away from other owners. In the end, almost all of the $1 million appropriated by the act was spent. As a result of the act's passage, 3,185 people were freed from slavery. However, fugitive slave laws still applied to people who had fled slavery from Maryland to Washington, D.C. until their 1864 repeal.

Although the U.S. government never expanded the compensated emancipation model beyond the District of Columbia, the act, along with the prohibition of slavery in the federal territories a few months later, foreshadowed the later demise of slavery in the United States. The act was the only compensated emancipation plan enacted in the United States.

The District of Columbia has celebrated April 16 as Emancipation Day since 1866, holding an annual parade to commemorate the signing of the act until 1901, when a lack of financial and organizational support forced the tradition to stop; it restarted in 2002. In 2000, the Council of the District of Columbia made April 16 a private holiday (i.e. one on which city employees are not given a free day off) and on July 9, 2004, council member Vincent Orange proposed making the day a public holiday. The District of Columbia first celebrated Emancipation Day as an official city holiday in 2005.

"When Congress passed the DC Emancipation Act in April 1862, giving compensation to 'loyal' owners, Coakley [Gabriel Coakley, a leader of the black Catholic community in Washington] successfully petitioned for his wife and children, since he had purchased their freedom in earlier years. He was one of only a handful of black Washingtonians to claim this. The federal government paid him $1489.20 for eight people he 'owned'; he had claimed their value at $3,300."

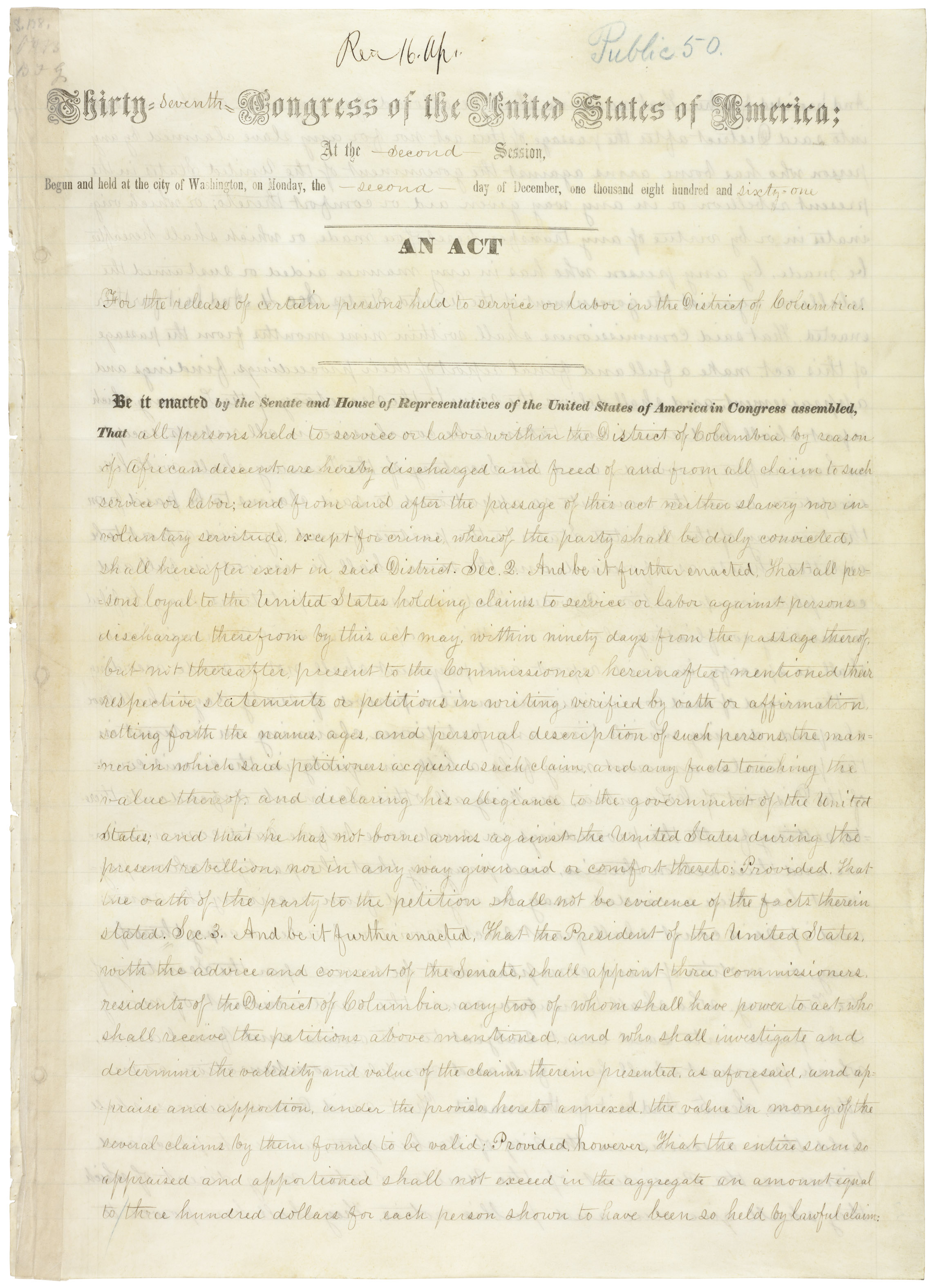
Page 1

Page 2

Page 3

Page 4

Page 5

Page 6

== Supplemental legislation ==
Following Lincoln's concerns over the version of the bill that he signed, Congress approved a supplement to the original Compensated Emancipation Act. The amendment passed on July 12, 1862, allowing formerly enslaved people to petition for compensation if their former owners had not done so. Under the supplemental act, claims made by blacks and whites were weighted equally, whereas previously, the testimonies of blacks—enslaved or free—were discarded if challenged by a white person.

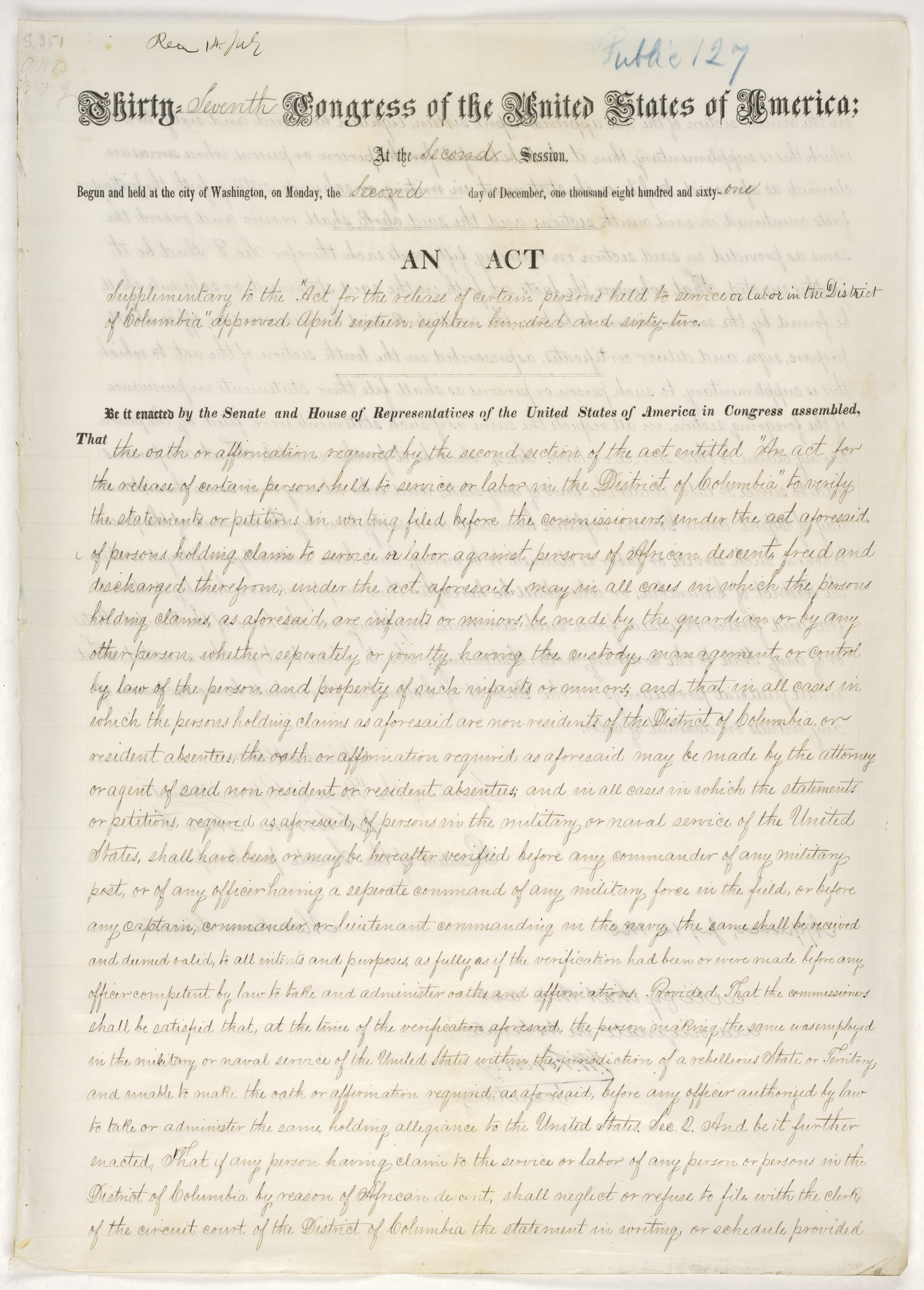
Page 1

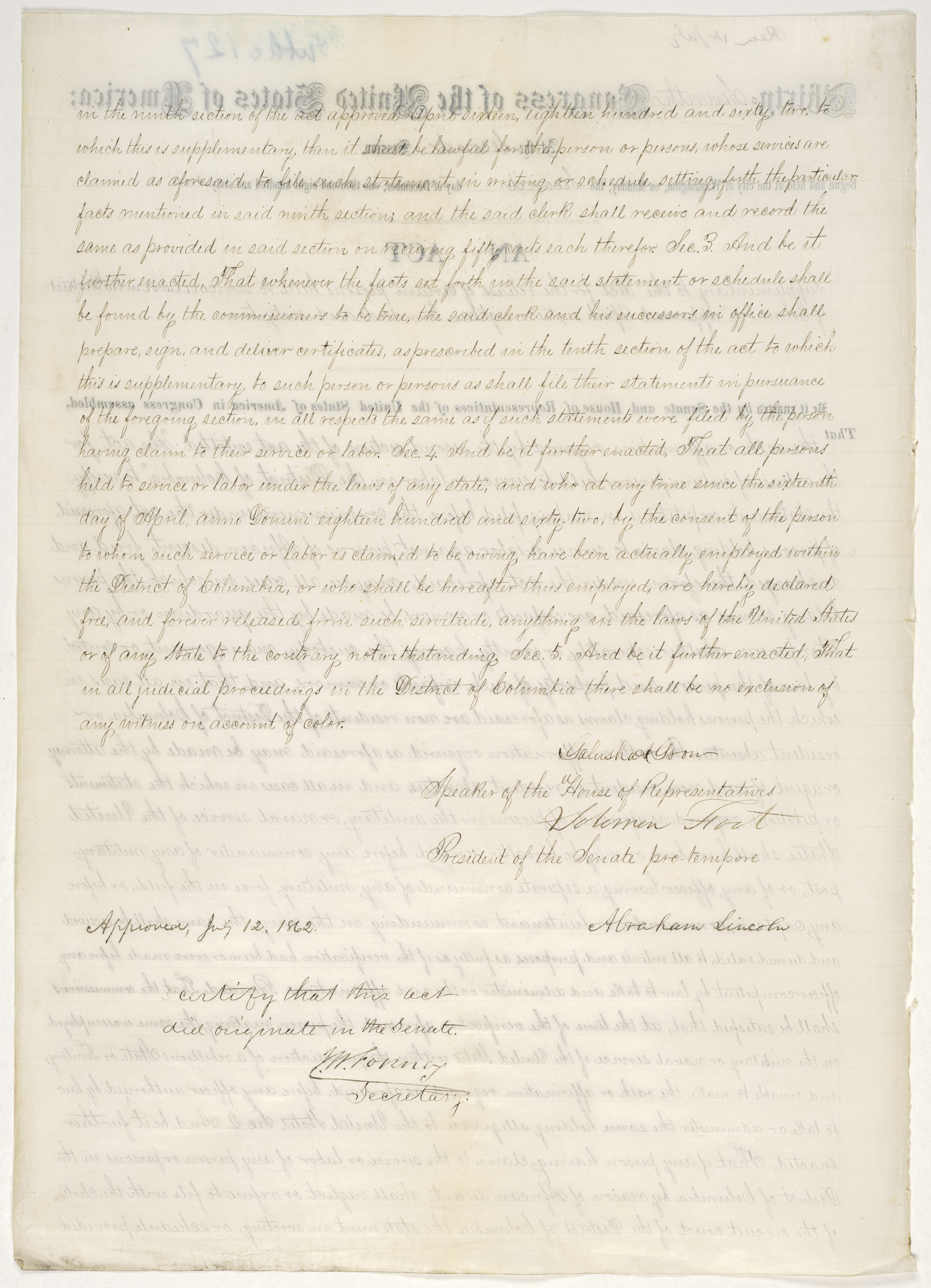
Page 2

== Video ==
- D.C. Emancipation Act, National Archives. Inside the vaults, U.S. National Archives, April 4, 2012

== See also ==
- Slavery in the United States
