= Union Hotel (Washington, D.C.) =

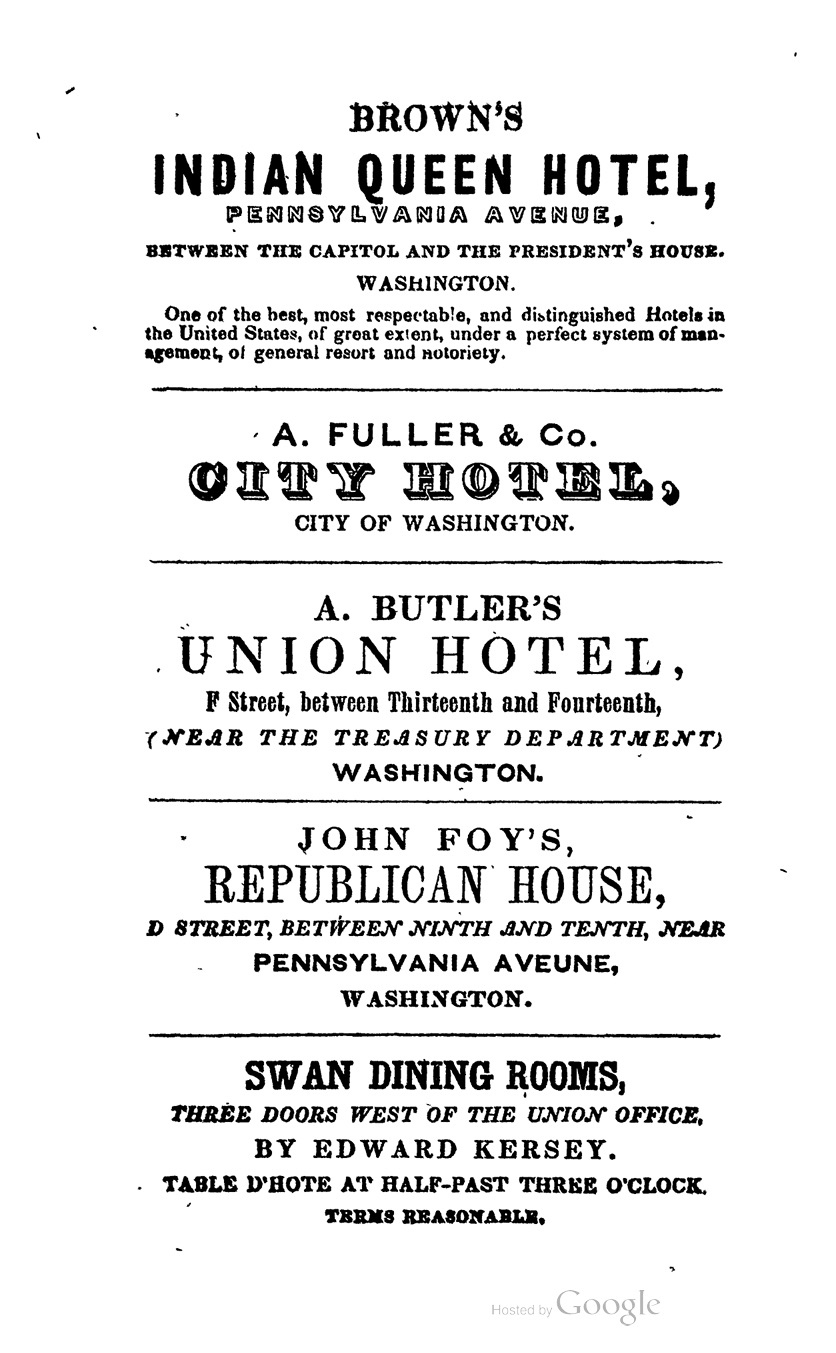
Washington D.C. hotels in 1846 included the Indian Queen (later the Metropolitan), Fuller's (later the Kirkwood), and "A. Butler's Union Hotel"

There were multiple buildings called Union Hotel in Washington, D.C. in the 18th and 19th centuries.

== Hotels ==
- The Union Hotel in Georgetown, District of Columbia, United States was located at the northeast corner of Bridge and Washington streets, later M and 30th streets. The building stood from 1796 to 1932. The hotel was converted to a hospital during the American Civil War; Louisa May Alcott worked there briefly as a nurse.
- Another Union Hotel existed in Washington in the 1820s and 1830s; it stood on the north side of Pennsylvania Avenue, between 3rd and 4th streets, "opposite the Patriotic Bank". This hotel may have persisted through the 1860s as there is testimony about Atzerodt lingering at the Union Hotel in the lead-up to the Lincoln assassination.
- A hotel called the Union Hotel stood on F Street near the Treasury Department. Dating to 1827, this hotel was a three-story brick building. It also was known as the Globe Hotel for a time. While this hotel was run by Jimmy and Bridget Maher, it was the preferred place to stay of Dakota people visiting the Indian Office. It was sometimes called the Union Hotel and Indian Headquarters.
